= Leadenhall Street =

Street in the City of London, England

Coordinates: 51°30′48″N 0°04′52″W

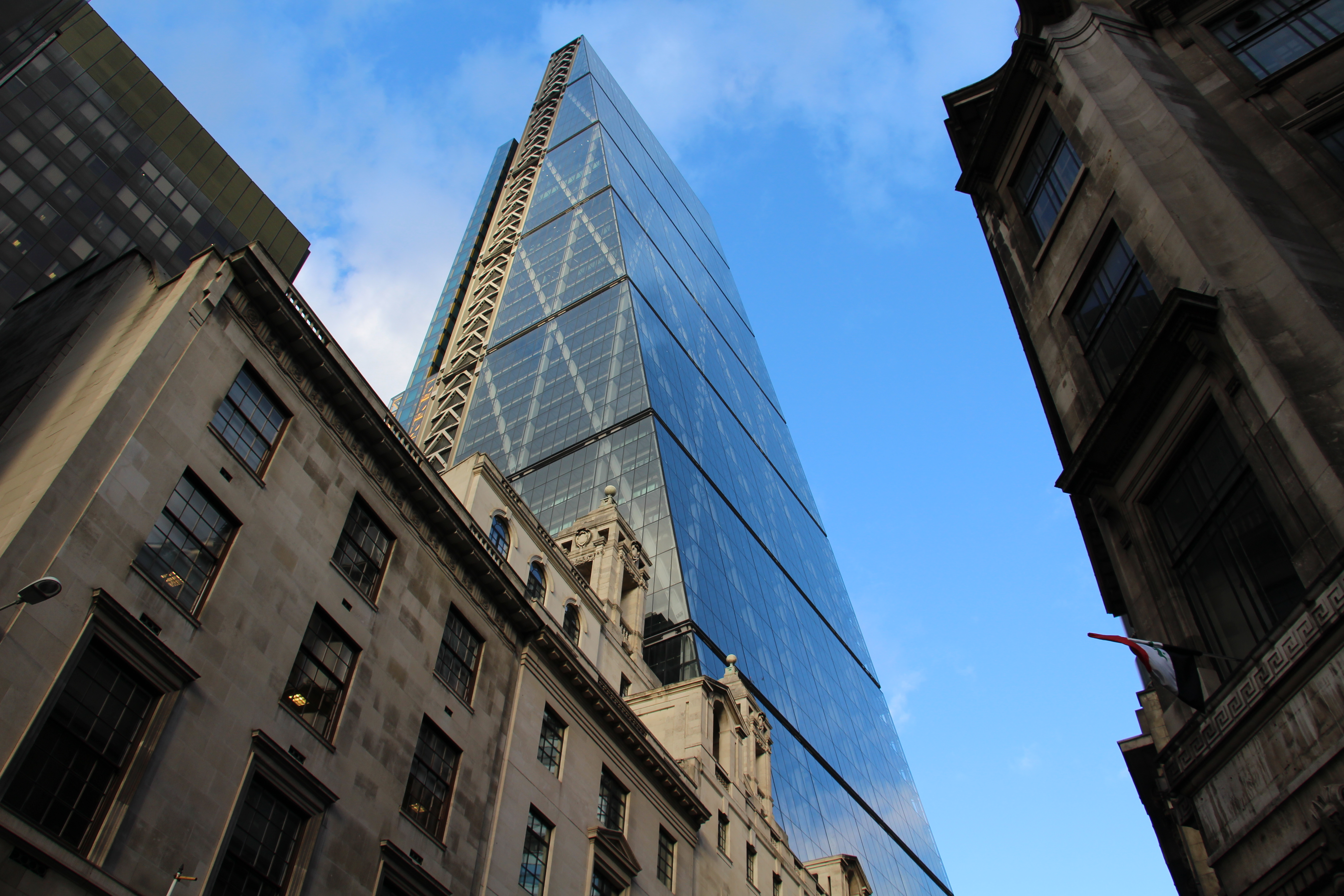
Leadenhall Street from Whittington Avenue in 2016

Leadenhall Street (/ˈlɛdənˌhɔːl/) is a street in the City of London. It is about 1/3-mile-long (0.54 km) and links Cornhill in the west to Aldgate in the east. It was formerly the start of the A11 road from London to Norwich, but that route now starts further east at Aldgate.

Leadenhall Street has always been a centre of commerce. It connected the medieval market of Leaden Hall with Aldgate, the eastern gate in the Roman city wall. The East India Company had its headquarters there, as later did P&O. By the mid 20th century, grand stone-faced offices lined the street. Today it is closely associated with the insurance industry and particularly the Lloyd's insurance market, with its dramatic building in the adjacent Lime Street. It forms part of a cluster of tall buildings including the 48-storey Cheesegrater (122 Leadenhall Street), the 50-storey Jenga (8 Bishopsgate) and the future 57-storey Diamond (100 Leadenhall Street) and 73-storey 1 Undershaft. Older buildings like the medieval church of St Katherine Cree seem incongruous among these towers, but the medieval heritage is preserved in the narrow slightly curving street and dense commercial activity.

== History ==
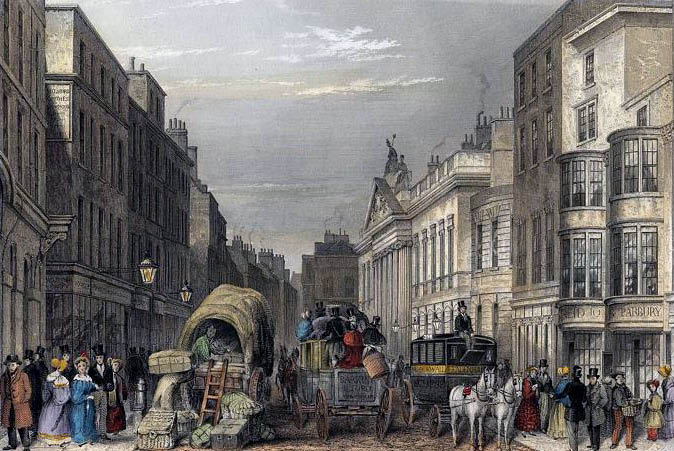
Leadenhall Street c.1837 looking east past East India House (engraving after Thomas H. Shepherd)

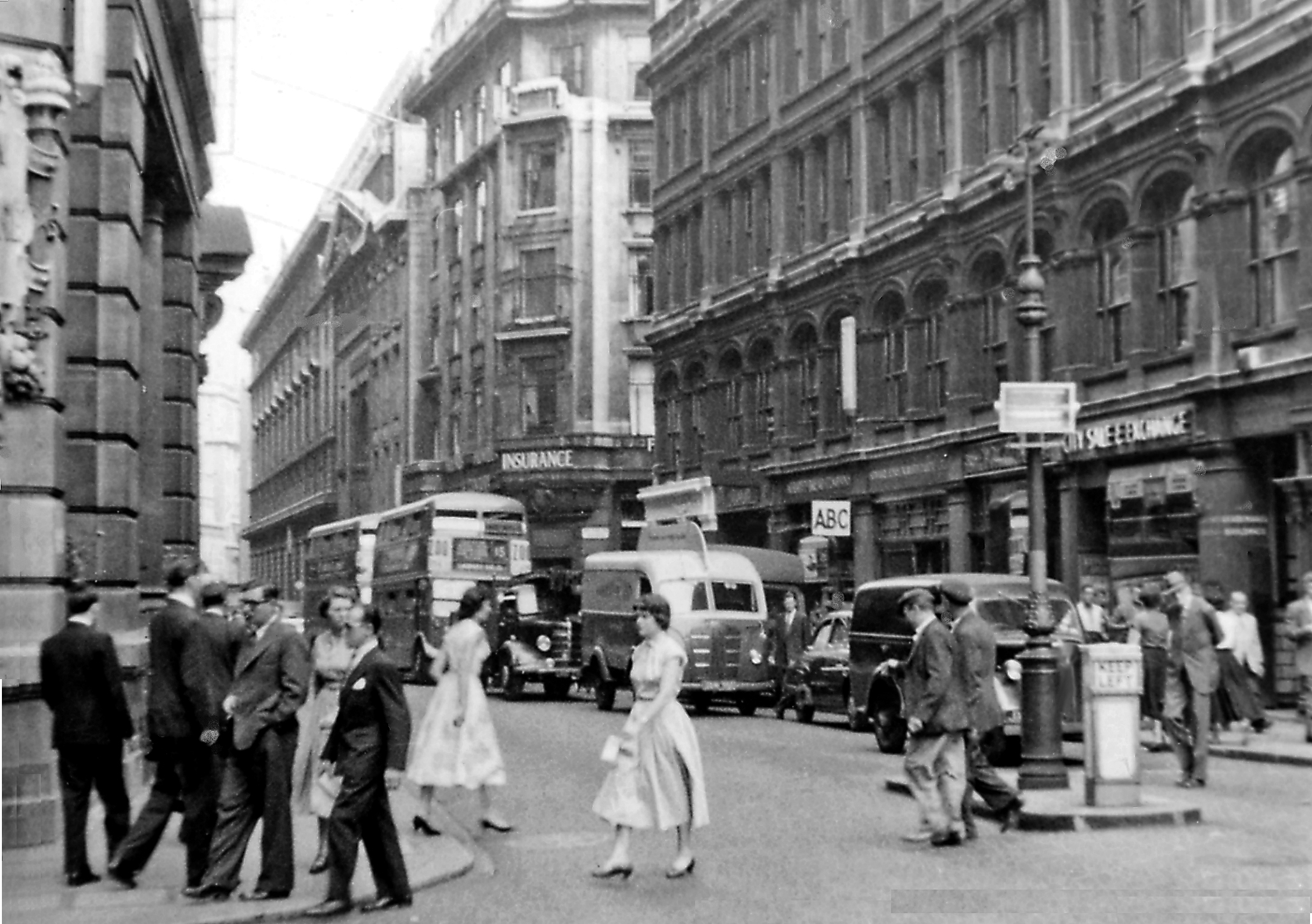
Leadenhall Street looking east from Bishopsgate in 1955

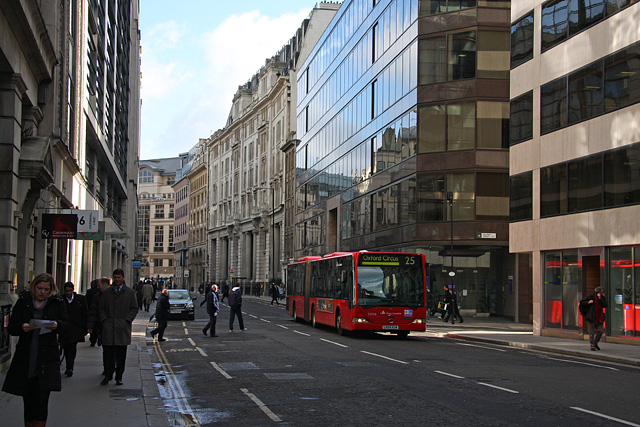
Leadenhall Street looking east from St Mary Axe in 2007

Although Leadenhall Street is within the walls of Roman Londinium, and a map published in 1897 showed it as a Roman street, this remains speculative. The basilica, the largest building in Londinium, extended beneath the western end of Leadenhall Street. Roman remains have also been found on both sides of Leadenhall Street, beneath East India House (now No 12) and the P&O Building (now St Helen's Square).

The street probably originated in the medieval period. It appears in a map of London in 1270, then named Cornhulle in the west and Alegatestrete in the east. The name derives from a lead-roofed mansion, first used as a poultry market in 1321. The street runs from this Leaden Hall towards Aldgate, the eastern gate of the city wall. The only remaining buildings from this period are the churches of St Katherine Cree and St Andrew Undershaft in the adjacent street of St Mary Axe.

The name "Ledenhall Street" first appears on a map from 1658. In the Great Fire of London in 1666, the north-eastern edge of the damaged area reached Leadenhall Market, leaving Leadenhall Street itself intact.

From 1729 to 1861 the largest building in the street was East India House, the headquarters of the East India Company. In 1840 Leadenhall Street comprised mainly 4-storey stone buildings, as shown in a pictorial record by John Tallis. Its business directory lists 158 separate premises with a wide variety of trades and merchants. Apart from St Katherine Cree, there are no survivors from this period. The oldest is the former Leadenhall Press building (No 50) from 1868.

In the Victorian era, merchants were progressively replaced by banks, typically sturdy 6-storey stone buildings. Notable survivors include Lloyds Bank (No 113), the former Bank of Adelaide (No 11), the former Grace & Co (No 147) and the Lutyens designed No 139.

Bomb damage during World War II mainly affected the south side of Leadenhall Street to the east of Lime Street (No 26 to 49). Early post-war reconstruction matched the height of existing buildings, while introducing modern styles such as the former Scandinavian Bank (No 36) and the former Bank of Credit and Commerce International (No 100). In the late 1980s, the former Midland Bank (No 69) and the former Swiss Re House (No 77) introduced the post-modern style.

Today Leadenhall Street is closely associated with the insurance industry and particularly the Lloyd's insurance market, which occupied No 12 from 1928 to 1958, and has since been based in the adjacent Lime Street. The 14-storey Lloyd's building, completed in 1986, started a trend for dramatic architecture in the area. The street is part of the “City Cluster”, considered suitable for new tall buildings.

Tall buildings on Leadenhall Street are constrained by the protected view of St Paul's Cathedral from Fleet Street. To avoiding impinging on this view, the Leadenhall Building (No 122) adopted a distinctive sloping profile, known as the Cheesegrater. The adjacent 8 Bishopsgate, known as the Jenga, steps back to follow the same profile, while The Scalpel across the street (52 Lime Street) slopes in the opposite direction. Other buildings being developed, including the 57-storey Diamond (100 Leadenhall) and the 73-storey 1 Undershaft, will fill in the gaps in this cluster.

== Buildings ==
=== South side ===
Starts at: Gracechurch Street

One Leadenhall – a 36-storey office building, including a 5-storey base with a grid of pre-cast concrete and glass panels, and a recessed glass tower above, designed by Make Architects and built during 2021-24. The site was part of the Roman basilica in the 2nd century, and was occupied by the original Leaden Hall, first recorded in 1309.

Side street: Whittington Avenue leading to Leadenhall Market.

7-10 Leadenhall Street – a 6-storey office building, built in 1924–1927. It was the head office of Friends Provident during 1929–1957. It was occupied by the Iraqi Rafidain Bank until it went into liquidation in 2008. The building was acquired shortly after by the Iraqi Ministry of Foreign Affairs, initially being used as a Commercial Attaché to its main embassy in Kensington. The Ministry still retains the freehold interest in the property, although the building has been vacant for a number of years. The building was briefly taken over by the Occupy London movement in January 2012.

11 Leadenhall Street – a 6-storey 3-bay office building, built in 1912 for the Bank of Adelaide. It was later occupied by the National Westminster Bank.

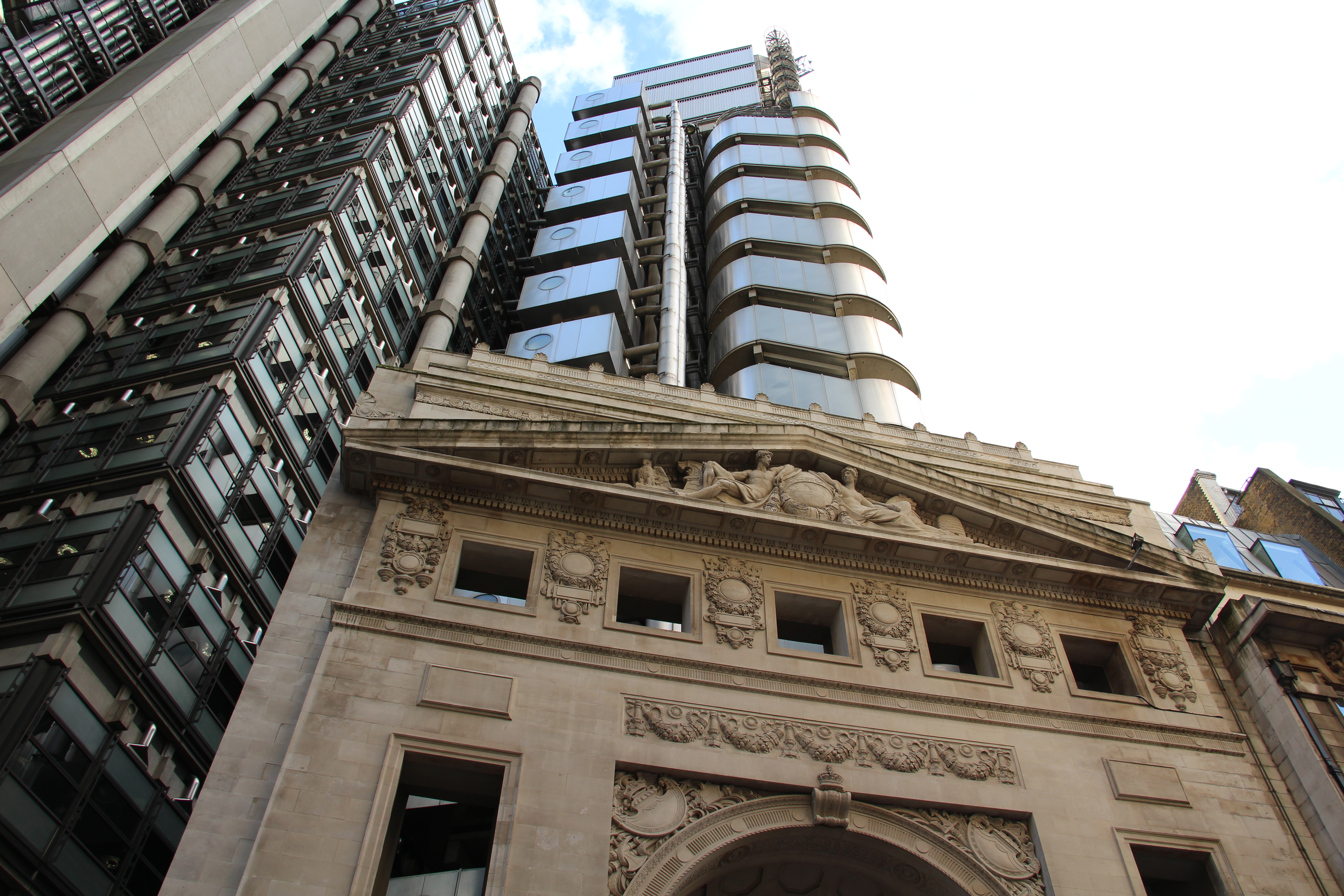
The arch of the former Lloyd's Building at 12 Leadenhall Street, with the current building behind, in 2016

12 Leadenhall Street – a stone arch is all that remains of the former Lloyd's Building, which was built in 1928 and demolished in 1979. The arch was designed by Sir Edwin Cooper in 1922 as a war memorial for the Lloyd's Rooms at the Royal Exchange, and moved to Leadenhall Street in 1928. From 1729 to 1861 this site was occupied by East India House.

Lloyd's of London, 1 Lime Street – a 14-storey office building designed by Richard Rogers Partnership and built in 1978-86 for the insurance market, Lloyd's of London. The building exemplifies the high-tech style, and is distinctive in having services such as staircases, lifts, ducts, electrical conduits and water pipes on the outside, with the aim of creating a flexible uncluttered space inside. It was the youngest structure to obtain Grade I listing.

Side street: Lime Street

The Scalpel, 52 Lime Street – a 38-storey office building designed by Kohn Pedersen Fox and built in 2013–2018 as the European headquarters of the insurance company W R Berkley. The building consists of a series of triangular planes of partially reflective glass with bright metallic fold lines.

36-38 Leadenhall Street – a 9-storey office building designed by Yorke, Rosenberg & Mardall and built in 1970–1973 for the Scandinavian Bank. It was built in a Chicago-derived flush-fronted style, with uniform floors and piers of polished yellow-brown stone, flush smoked-glass bands, and sharp mitred glass joints on the Billiter Street corner.

Side street: Billiter Street

40 Leadenhall – a 34-storey office and retail development, designed by Make Architects and built in 2020–2023. The site between Leadenhall Street and Fenchurch Street, surrounding the Grade II listed 19-21 Billiter Street, comprises a series of vertical slices from 14 to 34 storeys, nicknamed "Gotham City". The north façade has floor to ceiling glazing with flush back-painted glass panels across the floor slabs, creating a smooth wall of glass, within a perimeter metal frame. The site was previously occupied by the Institute of London Underwriters.

50 Leadenhall Street – a 3-bay, 5-storey office building. From 1868 to 1905 it was the home of the Leadenhall Press.

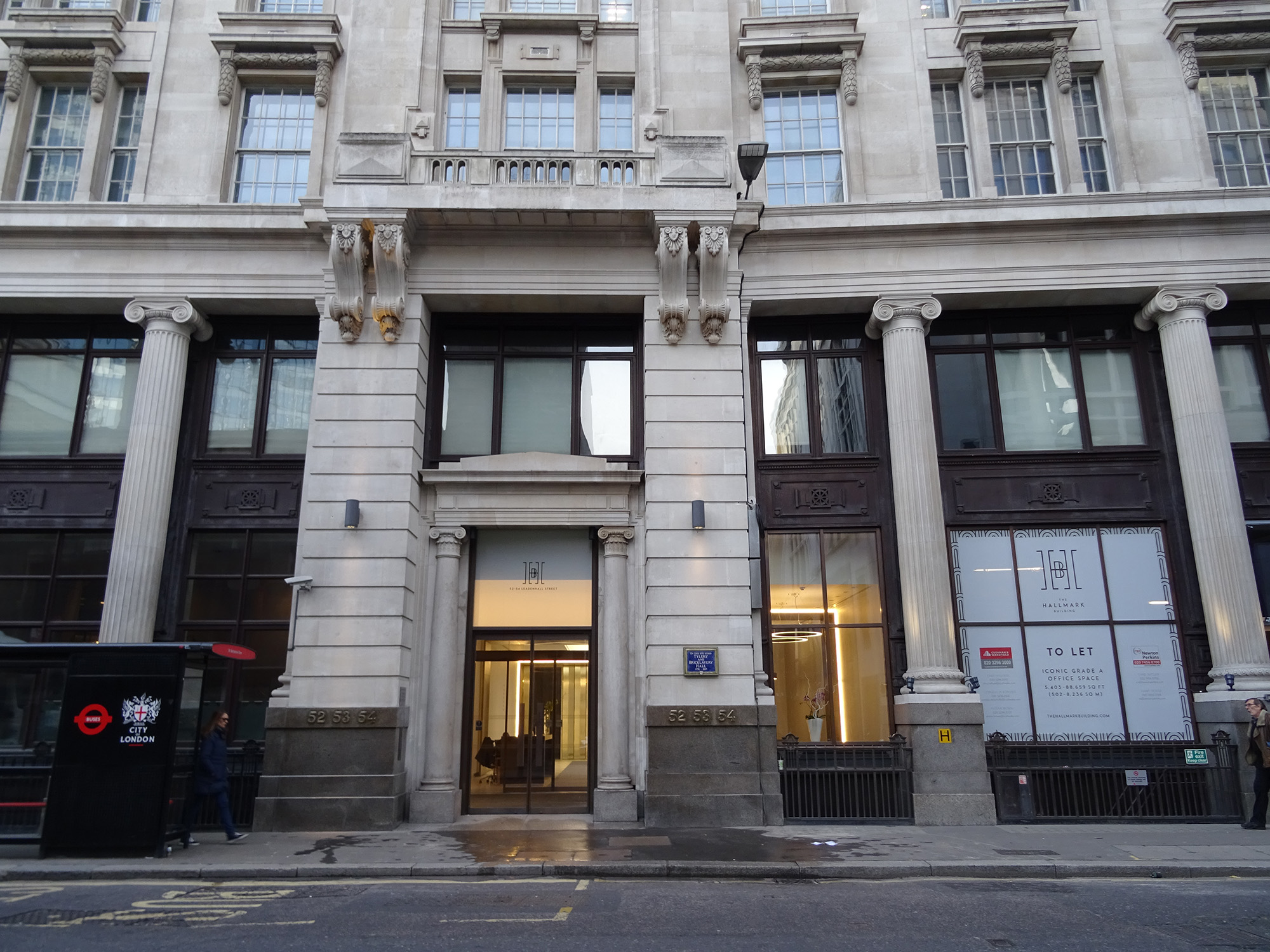
The Hallmark Building, 52-56 Leadenhall Street, in 2016

Hallmark Building, 52-56 Leadenhall Street – a 12-bay, 7-storey office building in the Beaux-Arts style designed by M.E. Collins & L.S. Sullivan and built in 1919–1921. It was previously known as Furness House, and occupied by the London Metal Exchange. The site was occupied by the Tylers' and Bricklayers' Hall from 1538 to 1833.

65 Leadenhall Street – a 5-bay, 7-storey office building designed by A.H. Kersey and Richardson & Gill and built in 1922 in yellow sandstone.

Landmark House, 69 Leadenhall Street and 94-95 Fenchurch Street – a 7-storey office building in the post-modern style designed by Terry Farrell Partnership and built in 1986-87 for the Midland Bank. The corner location is emphasised by a drum entrance and a glazed turret above containing a boardroom. The side elevations are in coloured granite with alternating layers on the lower floors.

In front of Landmark House is the Aldgate Pump, a Grade-II listed 18th Century water pump.

Ends at: Fenchurch Street

=== North side ===
Starts at: Mitre Street

77 Leadenhall Street – a 7-storey office building in the post-modern style designed by GMW Architects and built in 1986–87 for Swiss Re. The site was once part of the Holy Trinity Priory, which was dissolved in 1532 and mainly demolished, although a fragment remains inside the modern building.

78 Leadenhall Street – a 7-storey office building in the post-modern style designed by Ley, Colbeck & Partners and built in 1989–1991.

80 Leadenhall Street – a 7-storey office building designed by Hamilton Associates and built in 1988–1990.

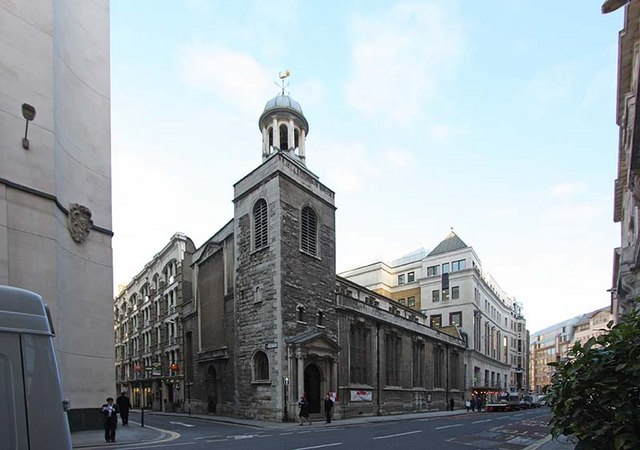
St Katherine Cree in 2008

St Katherine Cree – an Anglican church, founded in 1280. The tower is from c1504, with a cupola and doorcase from 1776. The church itself was built in 1628–1631, using squared ragstone on the foundations of the previous building, still visible on the south wall facing Leadenhall Street. The church is Grade I listed.

Side street: Creechurch Lane

88 Leadenhall Street – a 7-storey office building designed by Fitzroy Robinson & Partners and completed in 1999. It is clad in limestone, granite and brick. The design references the art deco style Cunard House, built on the site in the 1930s.

100 Leadenhall Street – a 7-storey office building designed by Fitzroy Robinson & Partners and built in 1971–1975. It was the UK headquarters of the Bank of Credit and Commerce International, which was liquidated in 1991 after widespread fraud and money laundering. The building was reclad in glass and stone in 2002 as part of a refurbishment programme designed by Rolfe Judd Architects. It will be redeveloped as a 57-storey building designed by SOM. It will have an angled façade with diamond pattern glazing, and has been nicknamed "The Diamond".

106 Leadenhall Street – a 6-storey office building in the art deco style designed by Joseph Architects and Surveyors and built in 1924. It has 3 giant bronze-spandrelled windows framed by Portland stone pilasters, with a projecting stone cornice above. It will be demolished as part of the 100 Leadenhall Street redevelopment.

Bankside House, 107 Leadenhall Street – a 7-storey office building built in 1931 by Bankside Investment Trust. It is built in Portland stone with deeply modelled classical features, in two sections stepping down towards St Andrew Undershaft church. It will be demolished as part of the 100 Leadenhall Street redevelopment.

Lloyd's Bank, 113-116 Leadenhall Street – a 5-storey Victorian bank designed by E. B. Ellis and built in 1891.

Side street: St Mary Axe

St Helen's Square – a public space at the junction of Leadenhall Street and St Mary Axe, between the Leadenhall Building and St Andrew Undershaft, named after nearby St Helen's church. The piazza was created in 1963 by the demolition of the P&O building (No 122), to enable the construction of the 10-storey Indosuez House and the 28-storey Commercial Union building. The piazza was refurbished in 2019.

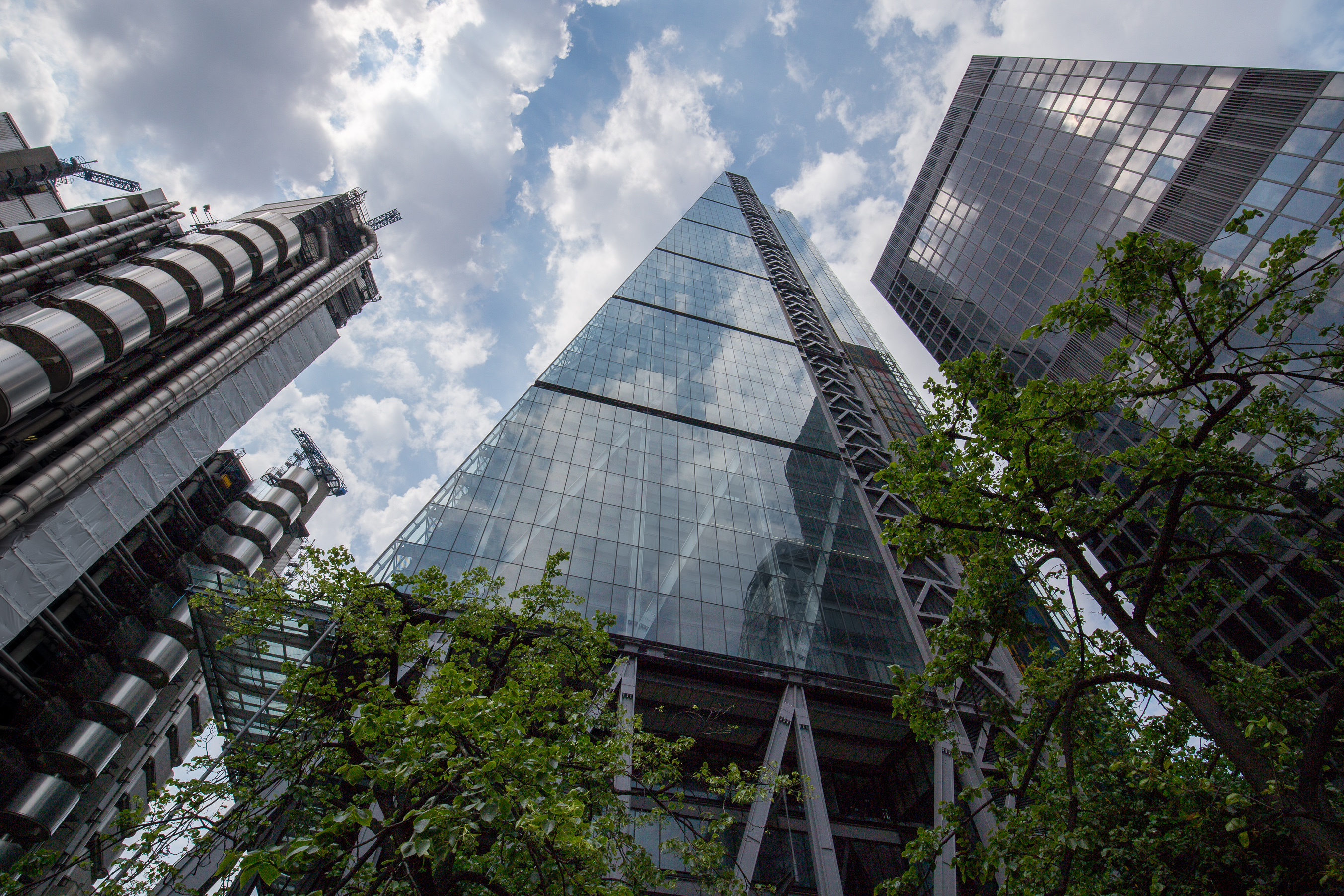
The Leadenhall Building from St Helen's Square in 2016

Leadenhall Building, 122 Leadenhall Street – a 48-storey office building designed by Rogers Stirk Harbour + Partners, built during 2011–2014, and known as "The Cheesegrater". The steel ladder frame is visible through the glass façade and exposed in the atrium at the base. 122 Leadenhall Street was formerly the Kings Arms Inn and Hotel. It became the head office of P&O in 1848. P&O demolished adjacent residential properties at 123-125 Leadenhall Street to create a new office in 1854. A new 10-storey P&O tower (later Indosuez House), was completed in 1969. The building was damaged by an IRA bomb in 1992 and demolished in 2007. A relic of the P&O building, a sculpture of Navigation, is now sited on the east wall of No 139-144.

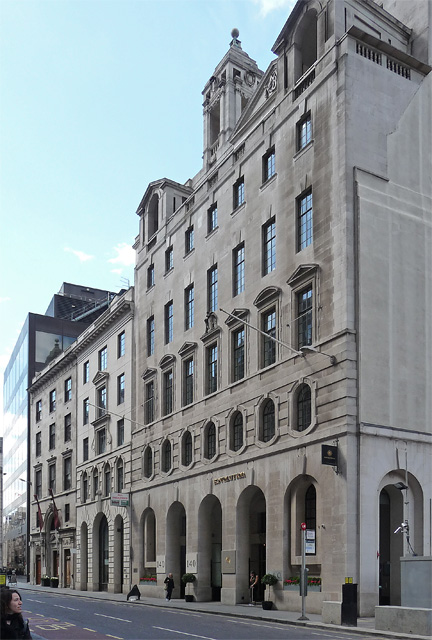
139-147 Leadenhall Street in 2011

139-144 Leadenhall Street – a 7-bay 5-storey bank with an elevation by Lutyens on a building designed by Whinney, Son & Austen Hall, built in 1929–31, now Grade II listed. The Portland stone front includes an arcaded ground floor that opens to a vaulted lobby, a mezzanine with arched windows with curved sills, a second floor with pedimented windows, two plain storeys above, and end-pavilions in front of a two-storeyed attic.

St Andrews House, 145-146 Leadenhall Street – a 3-bay 5-storey bank designed by William Nimmo & Partners, built in 1989–1992. It copies proportions and details from No 139-144 next door.

Grace Hall, 147-148 Leadenhall Street – a 3-bay 4-storey bank building designed by J W O'Connor and built in 1926–27 for the New York bank Grace & Co. It is now a Grade II listed private events venue. It is built in Portland stone, with a pedimented entrance to the banking hall, and an arch that extends into the mezzanine floor. Above are 3 floors with recessed sash windows with original wood frames and glazing bars.

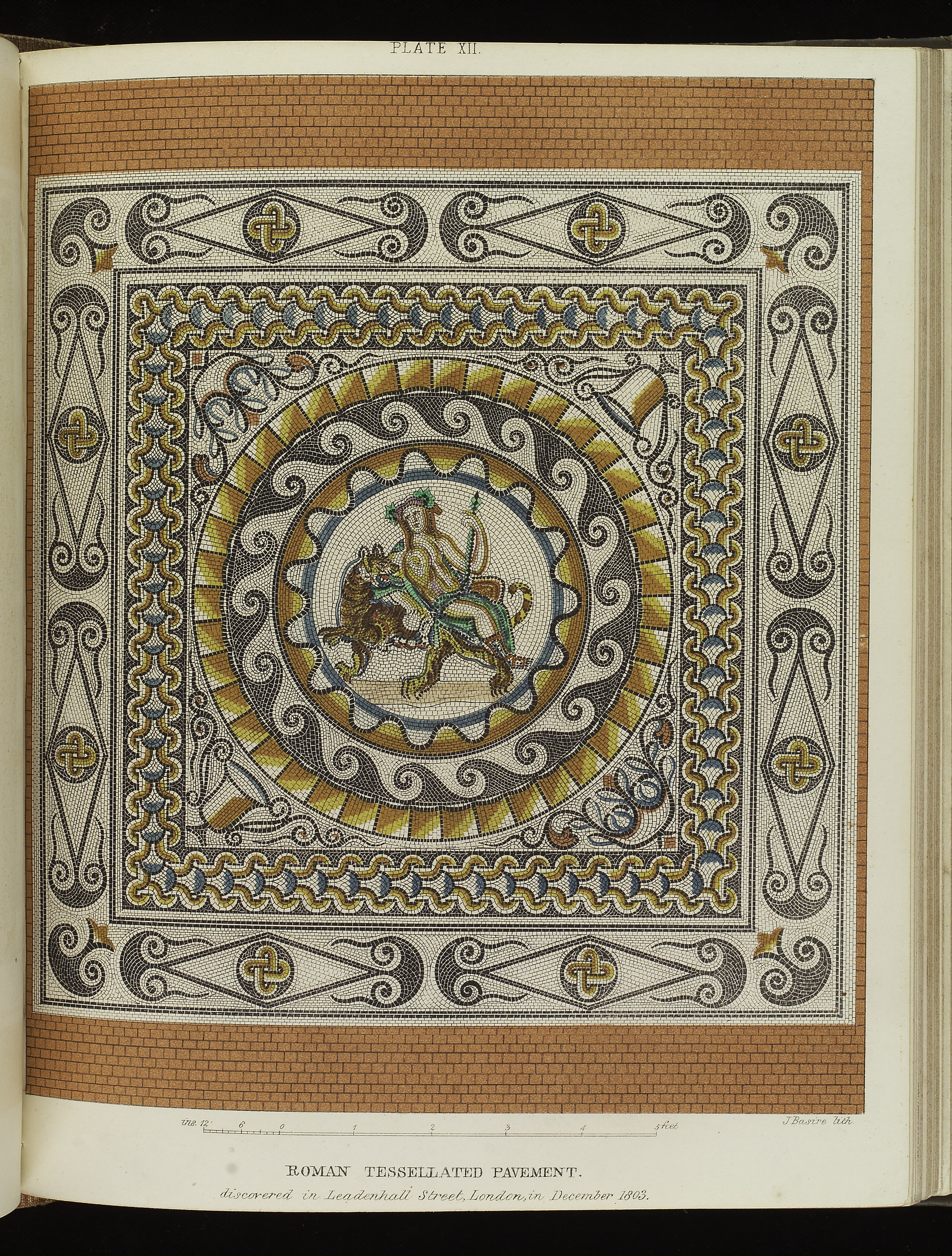
Lithographic illustration showing a Roman tessallated pavement discovered in Leadenhall Street in 1803

8 Bishopsgate – a 50-storey mixed-use tower designed by WilkinsonEyre and built during 2019-22. It is known as "the Jenga" because the design comprises a series of stacked blocks, differentiated by variations in glazing and aluminium fins, and by cantilevering the upper block. The corner building that faces Leadenhall Street is an 11-storey stone-clad block with deeply recessed openings.

Ends at: Bishopsgate

== Cultural references ==
The Leadenhall Street Mosaic is a Romano-British mosaic pavement from the first or second century depicting Bacchus astride a tigress. It was discovered during building work on East India House. The surviving pieces have been in the British Museum since 1880.

One of the first telephone exchanges in London was installed at 101 Leadenhall Street in 1879.

The Leadenhall Building (No. 122) is used as the venue for the BBC's The Apprentice interviews.
