= Brooks Macdonald =

British wealth management company

Brooks Macdonald Group plc
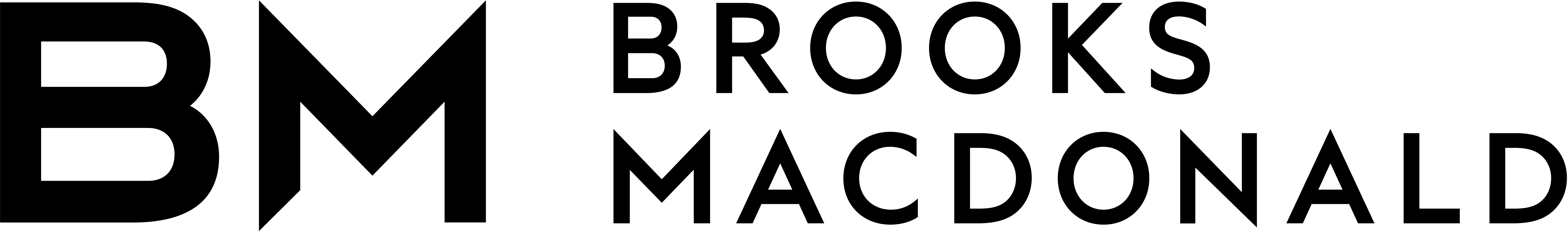

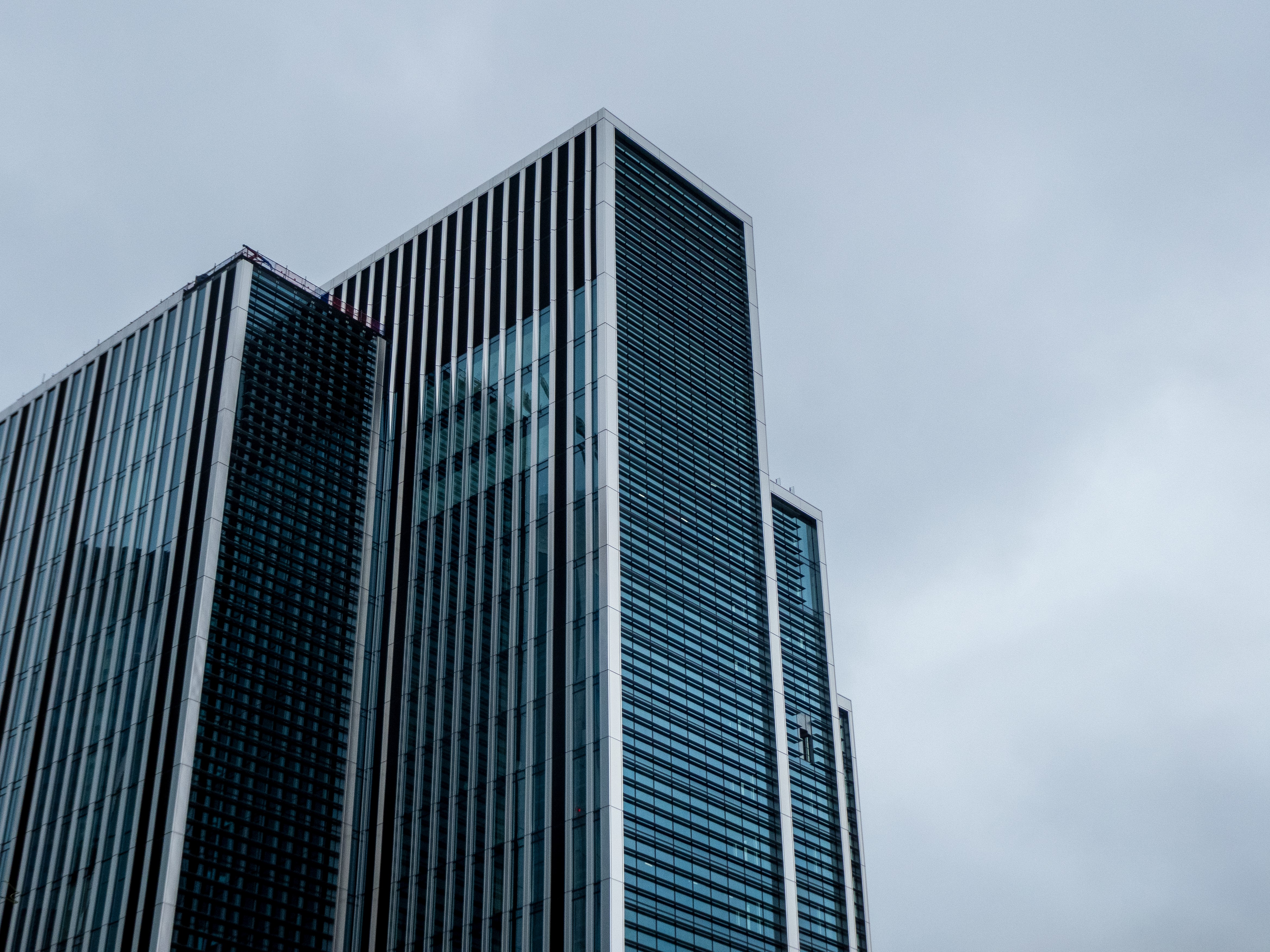
- Headquarters at 40 Leadenhall Street, London
- Type: Public
- Traded as: LSE: BRK
- Industry: Wealth Management
- Founded: 1991; 35 years ago
- Founders: Chris Macdonald; Jonathan Gumpel; Richard Spencer; Martin Mullany
- Headquarters: 40 Leadenhall Street, London, England
- Key people: Andrea Montague (CEO); Maarten Slendebroek (chair)
- Products: Investment management; Wealth management; Financial planning
- Revenue: £111.6 million (2025)
- Net income: £6.58 million (2024)
- AUM: £20.1bn (January 2026)
- Number of employees: c. 450 (2024)
- Website: www.brooksmacdonald.com

Brooks Macdonald Group plc is a British wealth management company headquartered in London with eleven offices across the UK. The company provides discretionary investment management, financial planning, and fund management services for private high net worth individuals, pension funds and institutions.

== History ==
=== Founding and listing ===
Initially named Brooks Macdonald, Gayer & Co, the company was founded in 1991 by Chris Macdonald, Jonathan Gumpel, Richard Spencer and Martin Mullany.

By 1993, the company reached £250 million in funds under management. In 2002, the company incorporated Brooks Macdonald Group plc.

The company began trading on the Alternative Investment Market of the London Stock Exchange (AIM) in 2005. Chris Macdonald was CEO of the listed business.

=== 2000-2009 ===
Funds under management by Brooks Macdonald exceeded £1 billion in 2007, the business opened a Manchester office in the same year.

In 2008, Chris Macdonald stepped back from his role as Chief Executive Officer and Managing Director. Macdonald remained CEO but Nick Holmes and Andrew Shepherd were appointed as joint managing directors.

In 2009, Brooks Macdonald completed its first major acquisition, purchasing UK-based fund manager Lawrence House. In the same year, the company opened its first branch in Scotland.

=== 2010-2019 ===
The company made its second major acquisition in 2010, purchasing property firm Braemar Group. In 2010 funds under management exceeded £2 billion for the first time. The company paid its first dividend in this year.

In August 2011, the company acquired the investment arm of law firm Clarke Willmott, gaining £120 million of discretionary client assets in the transaction. In the same year, Brooks Macdonald unveiled a new funds business which had £100 million in assets under management at launch.

Funds under management for the company surpassed £3 billion in 2012. In November of that year, Brooks Macdonald acquired Spearpoint, a discretionary fund management service provider based in the Channel Islands.

Brooks Macdonald acquired DPZ Capital and Levitas Investment Management Services in 2014, taking funds under management to a total of more than £6 billion.

Andrew Shepherd was promoted to deputy chief executive in August 2015.

In April 2017, Chris Macdonald stepped down as chief executive. Caroline Connellan was announced as his successor. In the same year, Brooks Macdonald opened its first office in Wales.

In March 2019, Andrew Shepherd was appointed CEO of Brooks Macdonald International. Later that year the company acquired Scotland-based Cornelian Asset Managers; the acquisition increased Brooks Macdonald's funds under management by around 10%.

=== 2020-present ===
In 2020, Brooks Macdonald acquired Lloyds Bank International's offshore management and funds business.

Andrew Shepherd was appointed Brooks Macdonald's chief executive officer in 2021, succeeding Caroline Connellan, who departed the business.

Brooks Macdonald acquired Warwickshire-based independent financial adviser Integrity Wealth in September 2022. In the same month the company announced the purchase of Manchester-based Adroit Financial Planning, adding a further £350 million in assets under management to the firm.

Also in September it was reported that the company had responded to the cost of living crisis by giving staff who were earning £50,000 per year or less a £1,000 pay rise to combat the increase in utility price cap.

In August 2023, the company partnered with UK charity Family Business United, supporting the financial planning and investment management of 250 companies in the UK.

In March 2024, the international division of Brooks Macdonald was placed under review. In June, Andrew Shepherd announced his decision to retire. Chief Financial Officer Andrea Montague was announced as his successor and CEO designate.

In September 2024 the sale of Brooks Macdonald International to Canaccord Genuity Wealth Management Limited was announced. . In February 2025, the sale was completed.

In September 2024, Brooks Macdonald announced the acquisition of Lucas Fettes financial planning in Norwich which was completed on 2 December.

Andrea Montague became CEO on 1 October 2024.

In October 2024, Brooks Macdonald announced the acquisition of LIFT-Financial Group in Altrincham. The acquisition was completed in February 2025.

In November 2024, Brooks Macdonald completed the acquisition of CST Wealth Management in Wales.

In January 2025 Brooks Macdonald announced its intention to move from AIM to a listing on the FTSE Main Market. On 28 February Brooks Macdonald was admitted to the FTSE Main Market.

== Current operations ==
As of January 2026, Brooks Macdonald had £20.1 billion in funds under management.

== Management and governance ==
Having founded the business in 1991 alongside Richard Spencer, Jonathan Gumpel and Martin Mullany, Chris Macdonald was chief executive officer for 25 years before he was succeeded by Caroline Connellan in April 2017.

Connellan left the company in 2021, replaced by Andrew Shepherd, who had previously been managing director and deputy chief executive since joining Brooks Macdonald in 2008.

In 2023, Maarten Slendebroek was appointed chairman and non-executive director following the departure of Richard Price; Andrea Montague was appointed executive director and chief financial officer.

Shepherd was the company's CEO until 2024, when he announced his retirement. Andrea Montague, CFO, was named as his successor - CEO designate - and she became CEO in October 2024.

In 2024, Richard Larner and Michael Toolan were appointed Co-Chief Investment Officers succeeding Edward Park.

On 25 March 2025, Will Hobbs was appointed as Chief Investment Officer.

Founder Richard Spencer remains at the firm as senior adviser to the Investment Committee. He previously was chief investment officer.
