= 1 Undershaft =

Proposed skyscraper in London

- Interactive map of the 1 Undershaft area

General information
- Status: Approved
- Type: Office
- Location: 1 Undershaft, London, EC3, United Kingdom
- Coordinates: 51.514242°N 0.081583°W

Height
- Architectural: 294 m (965 ft)

Technical details
- Floor count: 74
- Floor area: 154,156 m^{2} (1,659,321 sq ft) (office)

Design and construction
- Architecture firm: Eric Parry Architects
- Developer: Stanhope; Aroland Holdings
- Structural engineer: WSP

1 Undershaft (also called One London) is a skyscraper planned for the City of London financial district. The scheme is being developed by Aroland Holdings and designed by Eric Parry Architects. It is set to replace the St Helen's tower, and when it is built it will be the second-tallest building in London and the United Kingdom after The Shard). Despite being shorter than the Shard, One London will sit on higher ground, and the two towers will appear the same height on the skyline, due to the buildings sharing the same AOD (Above Ordnance Datum) height of 309.6 metres.

The building is the third design for a skyscraper at 1 Undershaft, replacing two previous proposals designed by architects Avery Associates and Eric Parry themselves respectively. The second proposal, nicknamed 'The Trellis' due to its external cross bracing, was given approval in November 2016, but this design was ultimately discarded in favour of a quad-segmented tower revealed in August 2023.

The substantial changes entailed will result in 1 Undershaft needing to once again apply for planning permission from the City of London Corporation. Construction is planned to take around five years subject to planning. In June 2026, a main contractor appointment was expected in late 2026, with construction planned to start in 2028.

== Background ==
=== Original proposal (early 2015) ===
Original design by Avery Associates, to the immediate right of 122 Leadenhall Street

In January 2015, early plans emerged of a replacement office building for the St Helen's tower in Undershaft within London's Square Mile. The proposal, named 1 Undershaft, was designed by Avery Associates; who began working on the scheme in collaboration with the then-owner of the site, Simon Halabi, in 2010. At 270 m (890 ft), it would have become the third-tallest building in London and the United Kingdom, behind The Shard and 22 Bishopsgate.

=== Second proposal (late 2015) ===
In July 2015, details of a revised scheme by the new owners of the site, Aroland Holdings, were reported. The plans were for a skyscraper of 304 m (997 ft) designed by Eric Parry Architects. According to some reports, the design could be "modelled on Cleopatra's Needle".

In December 2015, the new design was released for a tower of 294.6 m (967 ft) with 73 floors. Subject to planning permission, it was set to become the tallest building in the Square Mile when completed and the second-tallest building in London and the United Kingdom, behind The Shard. A consultation process took place in autumn 2015. On 8 February 2016, a planning application was submitted for the development, with a decision expected to be made in September 2016.

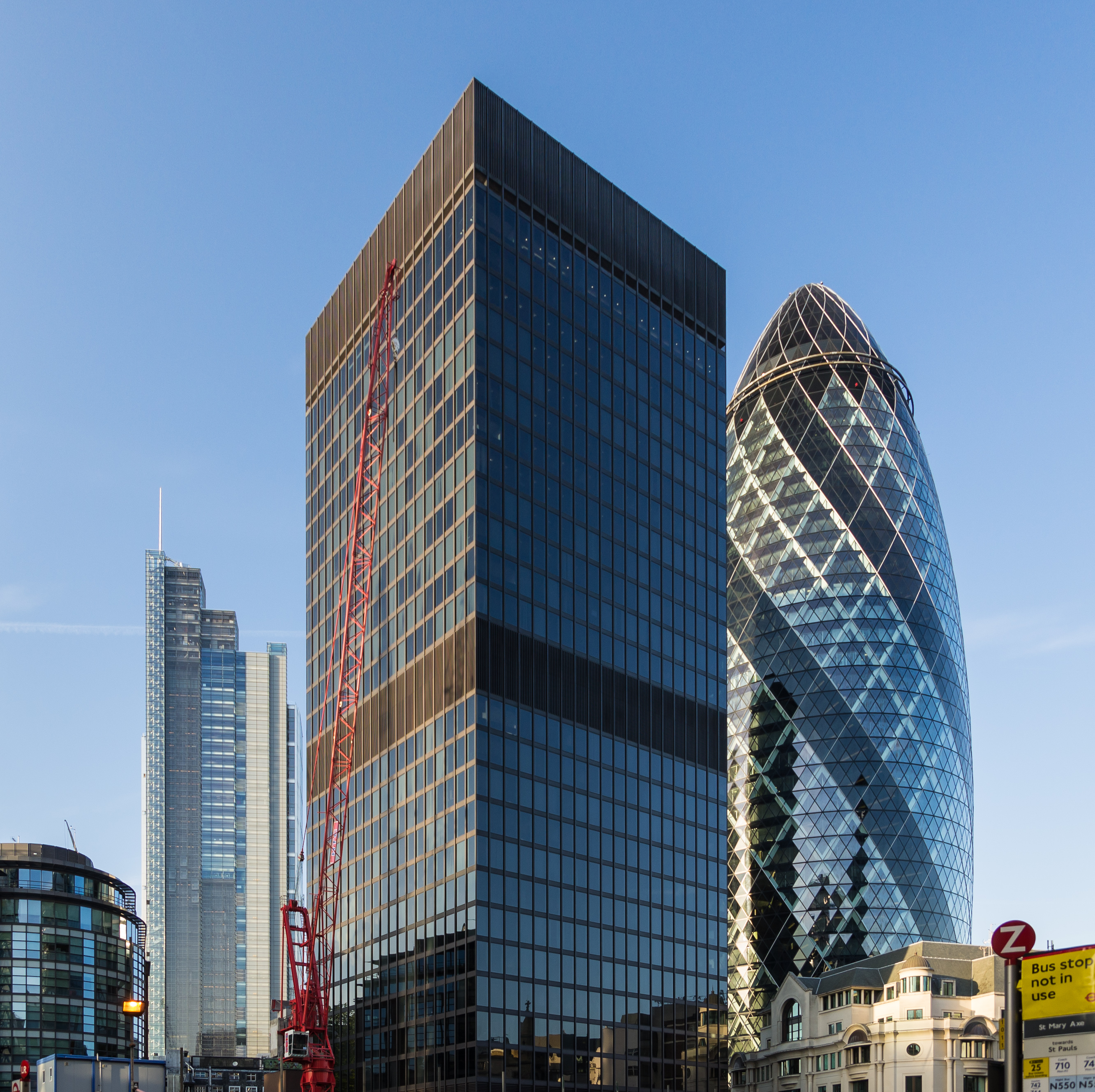
1 Undershaft would replace the St Helen's tower, pictured above

However, a revised planning application was submitted by the developer which reduced the proposed height by 4.66 m (15.3 ft) to 289.9 m (951 ft), due to possible interference with the flight paths of the nearby London City Airport. Each floor was reduced in height by 50 mm and structural floor beam depths were changed. In addition, the level of the soffit was decreased and the viewing gallery height reduced, which was intended to be double height. Despite its height reduction, the proposed height will still make 1 Undershaft the second-tallest building in London and the United Kingdom upon completion.

Following a recommendation by planning officers for approval, the scheme was approved by the City of London Corporation on 28 November 2016, with 19 votes in support and two against; final approval was given by Mayor of London Sadiq Khan on 12 December 2016. The start date for construction of the scheme has not yet been decided, but building work is expected to be finished anywhere between six and 10 years from its approval date, with demolition firm Keltbray the demolition of the St Helen's building currently on the site expected to take 18 months and construction of 1 Undershaft due to take between three and four years.

==== Design ====
Second 'Trellis' design for 1 Undershaft (centre), to the left of The Gherkin.

The second design's proposed skyscraper is rectangular in shape and slightly tapers as it gets higher. Developer Aroland Holdings, a British Virgin Islands entity of undisclosed ultimate ownership, originally wanted 1 Undershaft to be taller than the proposed height. However, the height has been limited by the Civil Aviation Authority (CAA) to avoid intruding on flight paths. In addition, the building's crown, which was intended to resemble Cleopatra's Needle, was not accepted by City planners who wanted "a less demonstrative top. They didn't want another overt shape".

The tower is designed to be built 10.5 m (34 ft) off the ground in order to create public space underneath the building. To make room for the public space, the core will need to be positioned to the side of the tower. As a result, bronze-coloured diamond-shaped external cross-bracing will be required, giving the building its nickname The Trellis.

A public square is also part of the proposed scheme, with 2,178 m^{2} (23,444 sq ft) of retail space below ground level. The top of the skyscraper is set to have London's highest viewing gallery free for public access (which could include a museum run by the Museum of London), and a restaurant.

=== Third proposal (2023) ===
In August 2023, Eric Parry Architects revealed a substantially revised design for 1 Undershaft, prompted by changes to working habits following the COVID-19 pandemic, as well as to improve the building's sustainability credentials. In place of the previous cross-braced and tapered tower, this redesign proposes a tower segmented into four vertical blocks, increasing the usable floor area by 30%. At 294m, the building will be the tallest in the City and second tallest in London as a whole.

A public roof garden on the 10th floor has been added, extending over a curved canopy above the corner of Leadenhall Street and St Mary Axe; several winter gardens up to approximately 1,530 m^{2}, external office terrace spaces up to 1,370 m^{2}, and around 110,000 m^{2} of workspace, up from the second design's 90,000 m^{2}. The public viewing gallery, shared with the Museum of London, remains part of the proposals.

In October 2024, Eric Parry Architects resubmitted the plans, reducing the building's footprint and opening up the lower levels. City of London Corporation’s Planning Applications sub committee approved plans for the building on 13 December 2024. The scheme - now called One London - was granted full planning consent by the City of London Corporation in December 2025; a main contractor appointment is expected in late 2026, with construction planned to start in 2028.

== See also ==
- List of tallest buildings and structures in London
- List of tallest buildings in the United Kingdom
