= City of London Pedway Scheme =

Network of pedestrian walkways in London

Coordinates: 51.51824°N 0.0945°W

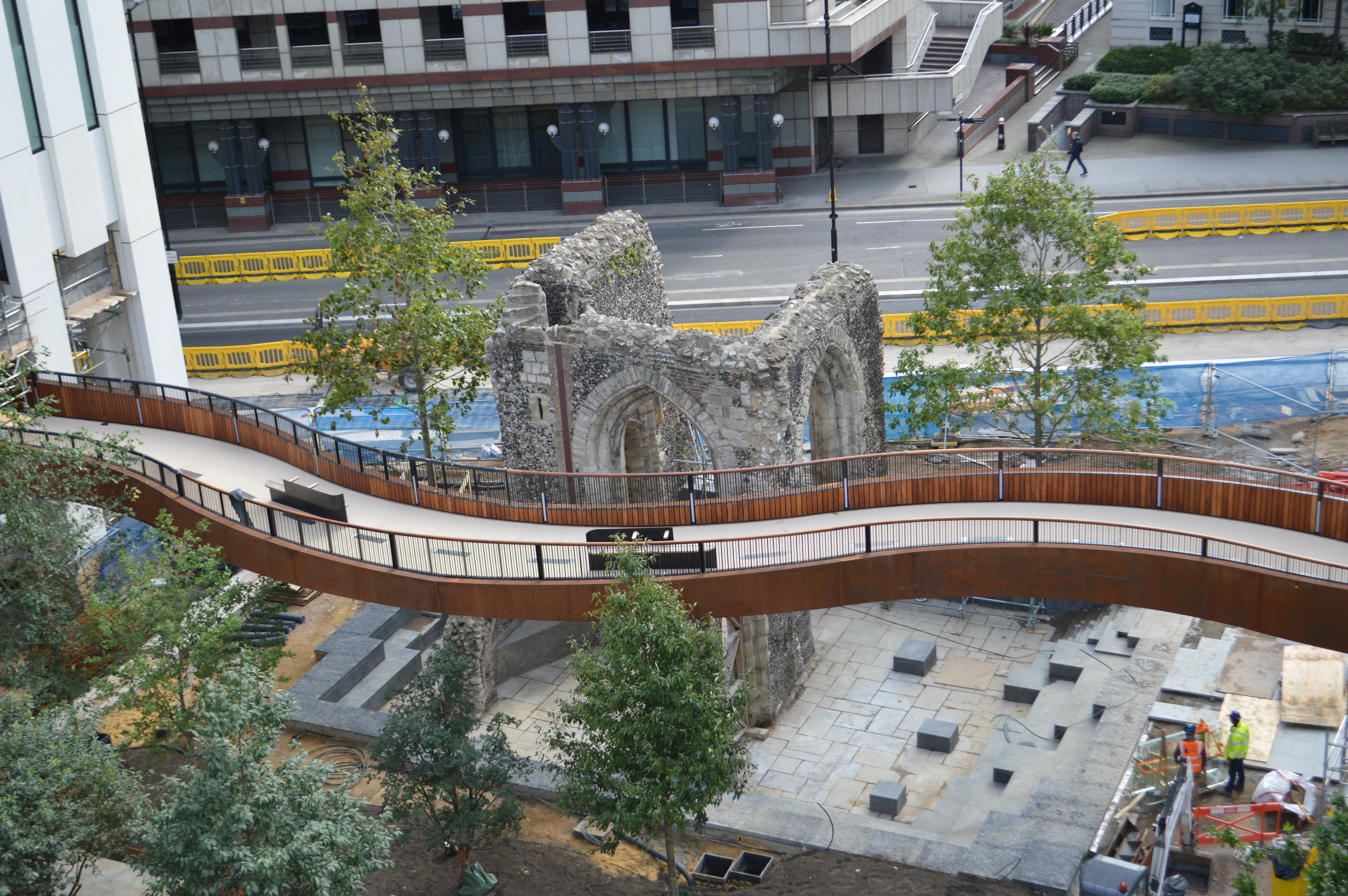
- The London Wall section added in 2017

Overview
- Owner: City of London Corporation
- Locale: City of London, England
- Transit type: Pedway
- Number of lines: 9

The City of London Pedway Scheme is a largely elevated pedway network that evolved out of a plan to transform traffic flows in the City of London by separating pedestrians from street level traffic using elevated walkways. First devised as part of the post World War II reconstruction plans for London, it was put into effect mainly from the mid-1950s to the mid-1960s, with expansion slowing in the 1980s. The scheme was partially revived in 2017 when a new section of walkway was added as part of a development in London Wall.

== History ==
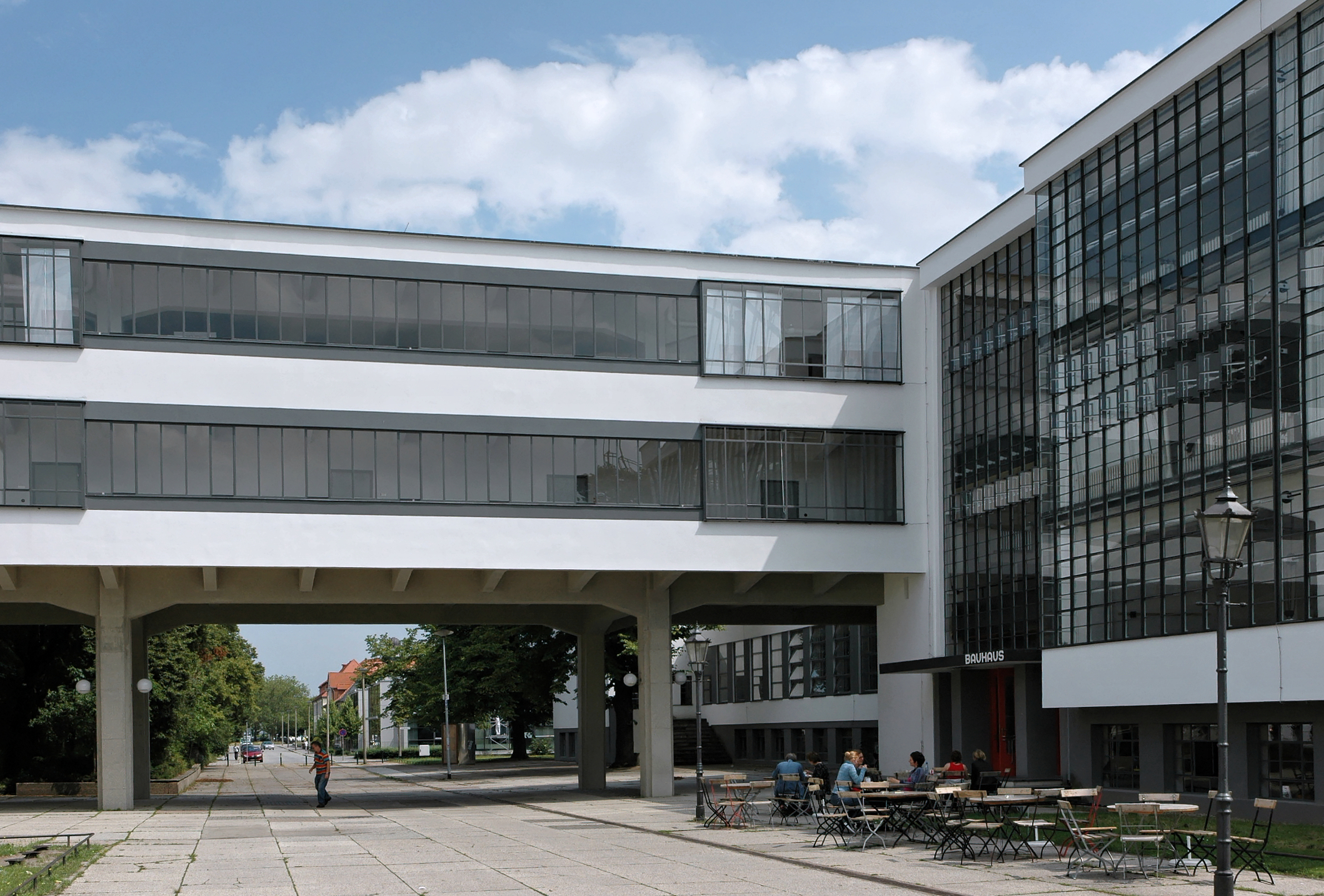
Bauhaus bridge in Dessau, Germany, designed by Walter Gropius (1925)

Versions of the plan had been under consideration since the 19th century, and given shape by the German Bauhaus movement, but the scheme was only given impetus in London after World War II, during which London had suffered severe bomb damage. Enthusiasts for the scheme saw an opportunity to put it into practice through the post-war reconstruction programme, and in 1947 architect Charles Holden and planner William Holford developed a blueprint that envisaged a network of first-floor walkways that would connect buildings across the City.

By the mid-1960s, the City of London Corporation had incorporated the scheme into its development plan. Although no coherent network was ever defined, designers of new developments were required to incorporate first-floor access to the Pedway network as a condition of being granted planning consent. As most of the network had not been built, this meant that many developments incorporated unused "dead space" at first-floor level and partial walkways that led to dead ends. In consequence, the scheme was unpopular with many architects.

Buildings that were required to incorporate links to the Pedway included the National Westminster Tower, which incorporated a pedestrian bridge across Bishopsgate that was never used and is now demolished; the Commercial Union building, the Barbican, and Draper's Gardens.

By the mid-1980s, the scheme had effectively been discontinued. The reason for its ultimate demise were escalating costs and the increase in influence of the conservation lobby, which opposed the extensive redevelopment of the historic areas of the City. The Pedway scheme only succeeded in establishing itself in areas that required extensive post-war reconstruction. The most extensive part of the network to be completed was in the Barbican Estate and surrounding streets; the main entrance to the Museum of London is, to this day, at first-floor level. Other significant stretches of the Pedway network were built in Lower Thames Street, Cannon Street and around the former Stock Exchange building.

In 2017, the pedway scheme was revisited when section of walkway was added as part of a new development on London Wall.

== List of City of London Pedways ==
The list below shows routes of pedways on OpenStreetMap

- The Barbican Highwalks (including the new London Wall walkways)
- Blackfriars / Baynard House pedway
- Peter's Hill pedway (all at ground level)
- Fyefoot Lane pedway
- Suffolk Lane pedway
- Swan Lane pedway (all that remains of this pedway is a staircase to a landing)
- Pudding Lane pedway
- Middlesex Street Estate (currently no public access)

== Pedways in other places ==
Pedways were planned, implemented and demolished in many other UK cities. In Manchester, there were the Hulme Crescents. T. Dan Smith planned the Streets in the Sky in Newcastle. There was a scheme planned and abandoned in Liverpool, leaving Liverpool Moorfields station with subterranean track, but a first floor booking hall.

In Europe, pedways exist in the La Défense and Beaugrenelle areas of Paris, La Part Dieu area of Lyons, and the Mériadeck area of Bordeaux.

Pedways (and pedestrian tunnels) have been more successfully implemented in other parts of the world especially where fully enclosed connections allow year-round use even during inclement weather. They are sometimes called skyways. Examples include Central Elevated Walkway in Hong Kong and the Houston tunnel system providing protection from heat and humidity, and PATH in Toronto, +15 in Calgary, the Chicago Pedway and the Minneapolis Skyway System, providing protection from cold.
