= 40 Leadenhall Street =

Building in the City of London

Coordinates: 51°30′47″N 0°4′48″W

40 Leadenhall
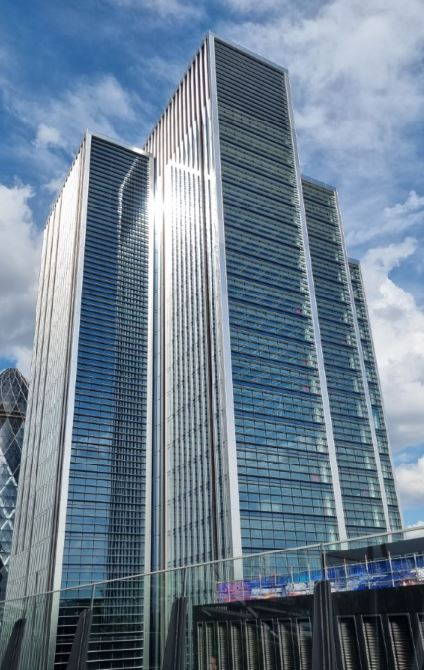
- 40 Leadenhall in September 2023
- Interactive map of the 40 Leadenhall area

General information
- Status: Completed
- Location: 40 Leadenhall Street, London, EC3, United Kingdom
- Construction started: 2020
- Completed: 2024
- Cost: £875 million (estimate)
- Client: Henderson Global Investors

Height
- Height: 155 m (509 ft) (170 m (560 ft) AOD)

Technical details
- Floor count: 35
- Floor area: Offices: 890,000 sq ft (82,700 m^{2}); Retail: 20,000 sq ft (1,900 m^{2})

Design and construction
- Architecture firm: Make Architects

Website
- 40leadenhall.london

40 Leadenhall, also known as Stanza London, is a commercial skyscraper on Leadenhall Street in London, England. It is located within the City of London financial district and is one of a number of new building developments for the area.

== Site ownership and location ==
The development site, known as the Leadenhall Triangle, was purchased by Henderson Global Investors in June 2011 for around £190 million.

It is situated in the Aldgate ward in the eastern portion of the City of London, and is a short distance from the Leadenhall Building and the Lloyd's building.

== History ==
=== Planning ===
In October 2013, Vanquish Properties (UK) Limited Partnership applied for planning permission to construct a building comprising 10, 14 and 34 storeys to a maximum height of 170 m (560 ft) (AOD) on a site bounded by 19–21 and 22 Billiter Street, 49 Leadenhall Street, 108 and 109–114 Fenchurch Street, and 6–8 and 9–13 Fenchurch Buildings. The listed building at 19–21 Billiter Street was retained whilst all other existing properties on the site were demolished.

Planning permission was granted by the City of London Corporation on 29 May 2014, following a resolution to grant permission by the Planning and Transportation Committee on 25 February 2014, subject to certain planning obligations being met.

=== Construction ===
Following Brexit, the developer announced that construction would only go ahead when a sufficient amount of office space had been pre-let.

In October 2019, it was announced that M&G and Prudential had bought the site and would fund its construction for £875 m, with a final development value of £1.4 bn. The build started in 2020 after Keltbray completed clearing the Leadenhall Triangle site. This was undertaken despite there being no pre-let. The building was completed in 2024.

== Design ==
The building varies in height by being laid in a series of vertical slices ranging from 7 to 34 storeys at the Leadenhall Street end.

== Tenants (floor/s) ==
Acrisure RE (8-9), Ark Syndicate Management (11), Chubb (mezzanine,3-4,12), Huckletree (1-2), Kirkland & Ellis (15-34), McGill (13-14), Monex (12), NKSJ/Sompo Japan (4-6,12), Shawbrook Bank (10).

== Gallery ==
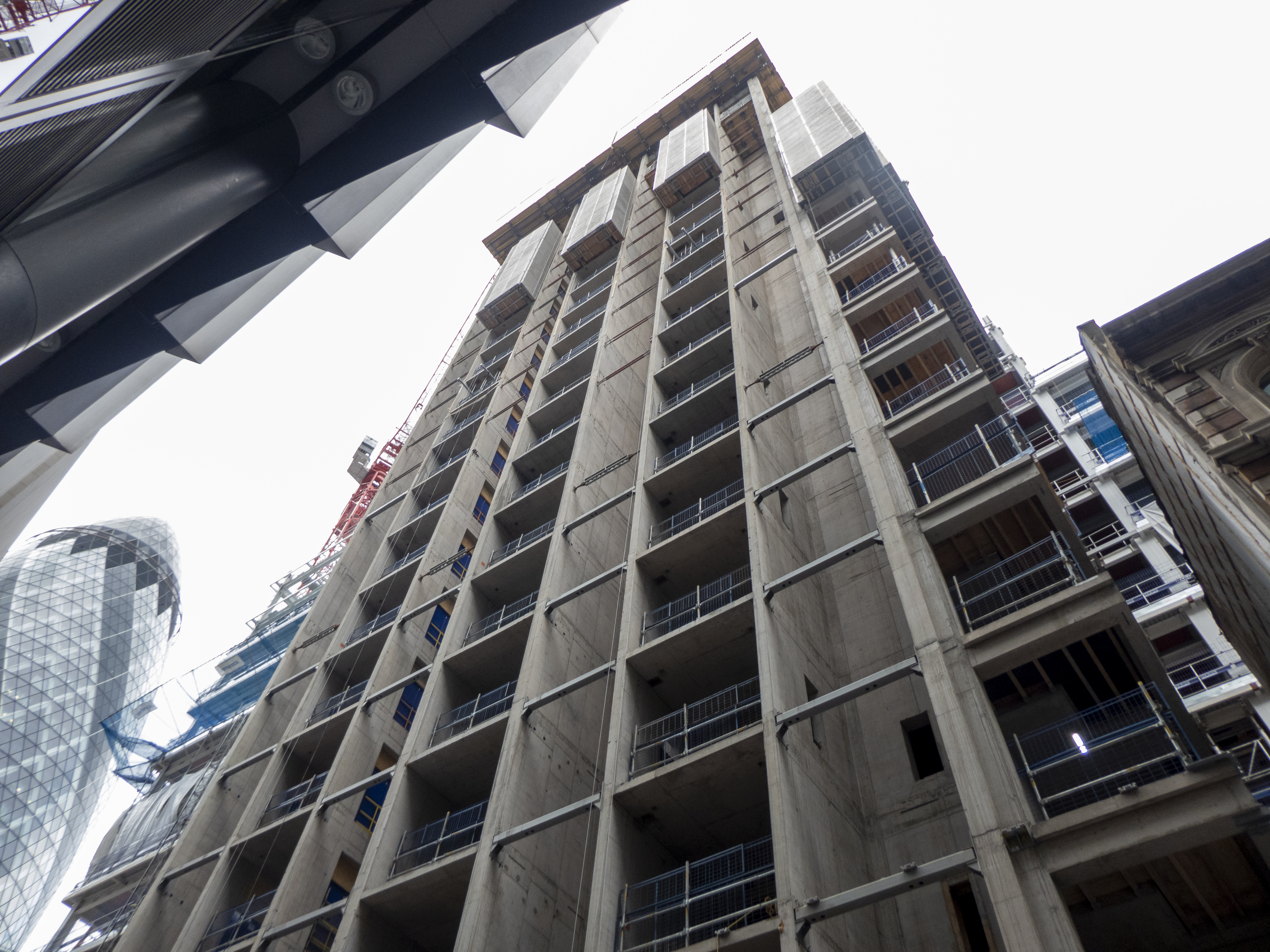
The construction site in August 2021

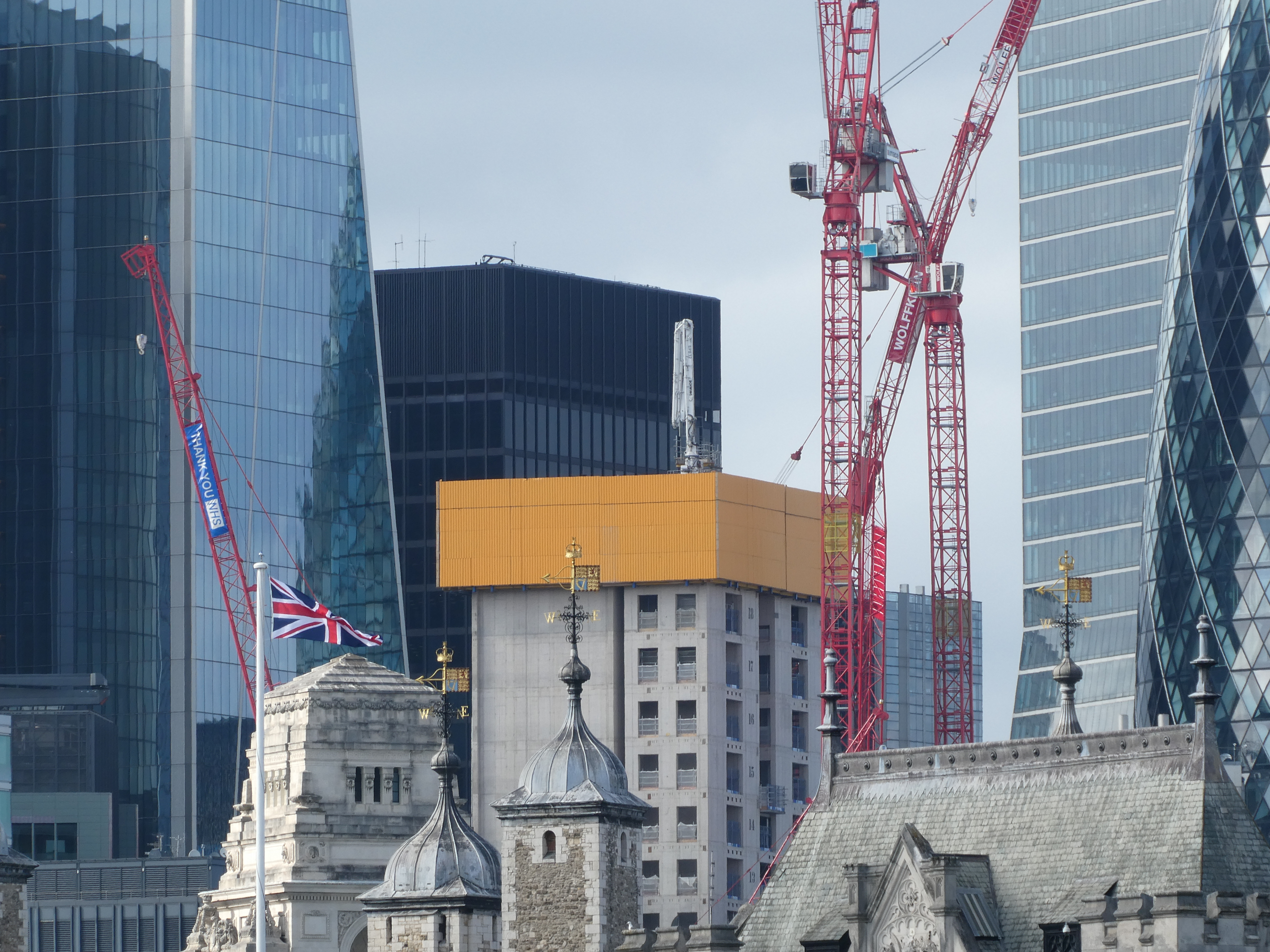
Construction of the concrete structure in August 2021

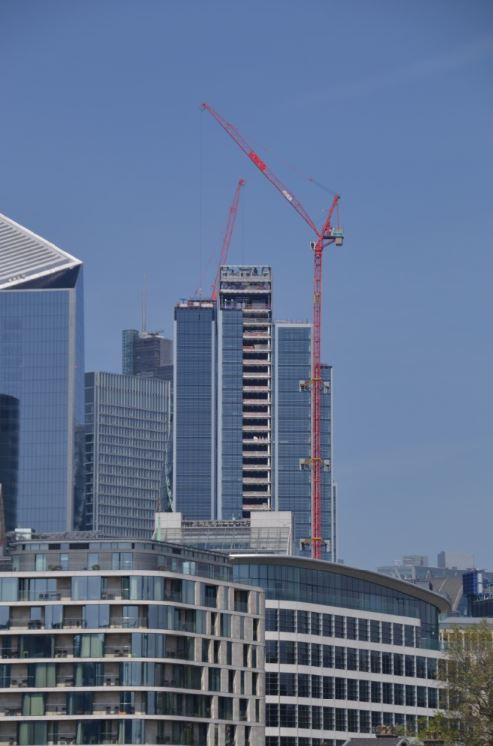
40 Leadenhall Street in July 2023
