= 8 Bishopsgate =

Commercial skyscraper in the City of London

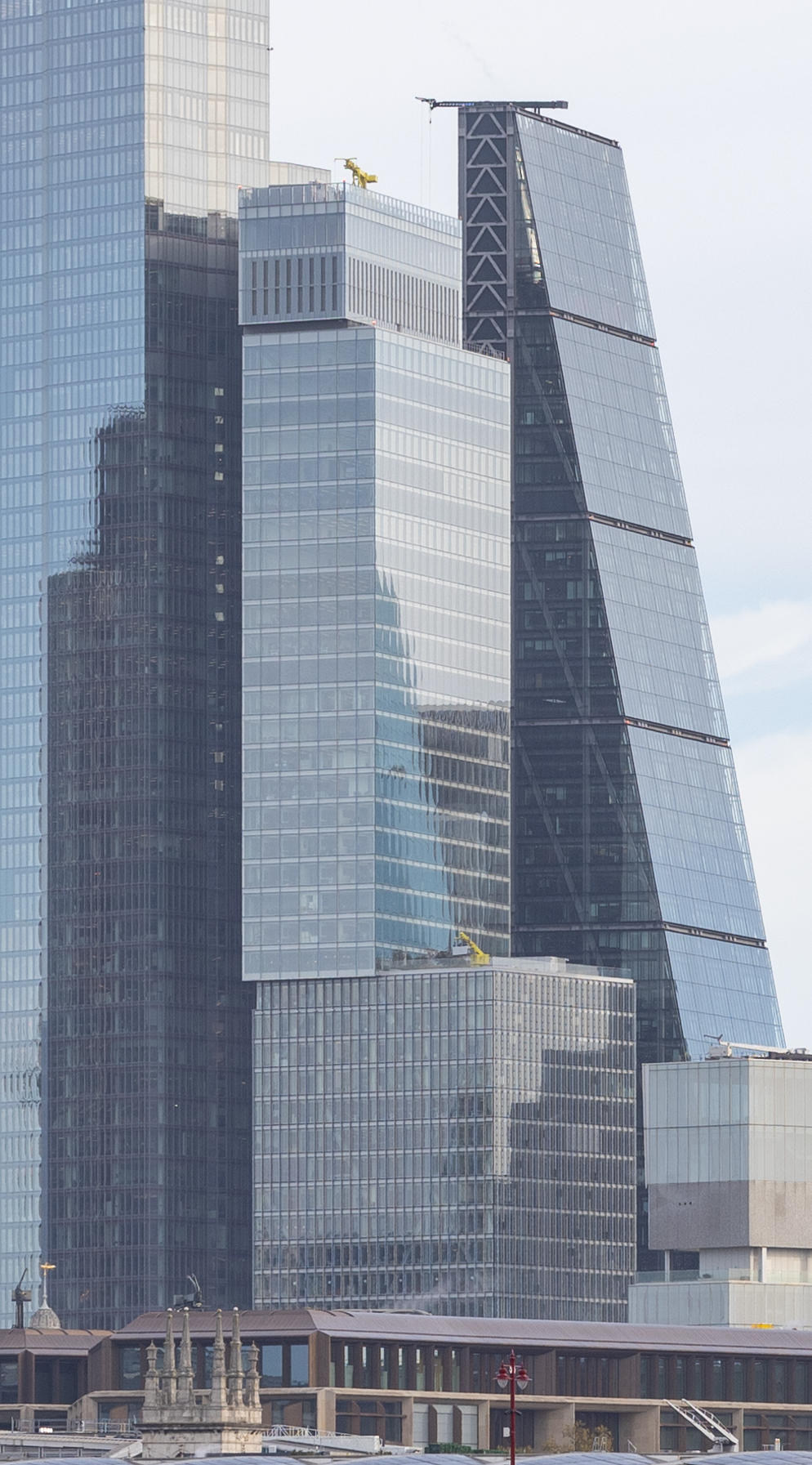
- 8 Bishopsgate in 2024
- Interactive map of the 8 Bishopsgate area
- Alternative names: 150 Leadenhall Street, 6–8 Bishopsgate

General information
- Type: Office
- Architectural style: Contemporary modern
- Location: 8 Bishopsgate, City of London EC2N 4BQ
- Coordinates: 51.5139°N 0.0835°W
- Construction started: 2019
- Completed: 2023

Height
- Height: 204 m (669 ft)

Technical details
- Floor count: 51
- Lifts/elevators: 8

Design and construction
- Architecture firm: WilkinsonEyre
- Developer: Mitsubishi Estate; Stanhope plc
- Structural engineer: Arup
- Services engineer: Arup

Website
- 8bishopsgate.com

8 Bishopsgate is a 51-storey, 204-metre (669 ft) tall commercial skyscraper located in the City of London financial district. When it opened in 2023, it was the 11th-tallest building in London. Situated on the corner of Bishopsgate and Leadenhall Street, it neighbours two taller skyscrapers, 122 Leadenhall Street and 22 Bishopsgate. It has a free viewing gallery on the 50th floor.

== History ==
=== Previous building ===
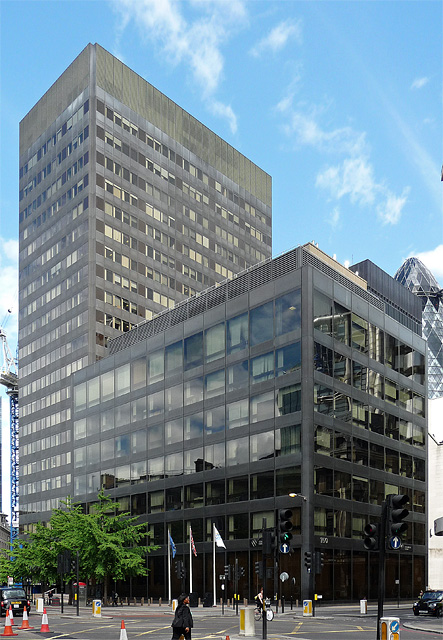
The previous building located at 6–8 Bishopsgate

The current skyscraper replaced 6–8 Bishopsgate, a 79 m (259 ft) tall office building that was the headquarters of Barings Bank up until the bank collapsed in 1995. Barings Bank had been based at 8 Bishopsgate since 1806, the building undergoing several expansions and refurbishments up until it was replaced by a high-rise. Designed by GMW Architects, construction started in 1977 and took four years. The building opened in 1981 and was in use until 2019.

=== Planning ===
The original contested scheme for 8 Bishopsgate was submitted in 2015. The skyscraper was designed to be 'visually striking', incorporating high-quality warm building materials such as wood and marble to welcome visitors inside.

The building was constructed as part of a wave of high-rise development in the Bishopsgate area, caused by growing demand for office space in the City of London.

Demolition work on the previous buildings began in mid-2018, with construction work beginning on the new building in 2019. The skyscraper opened in 2023, and includes a free viewing platform, The Look0ut, located on the 50th floor.

== Gallery ==
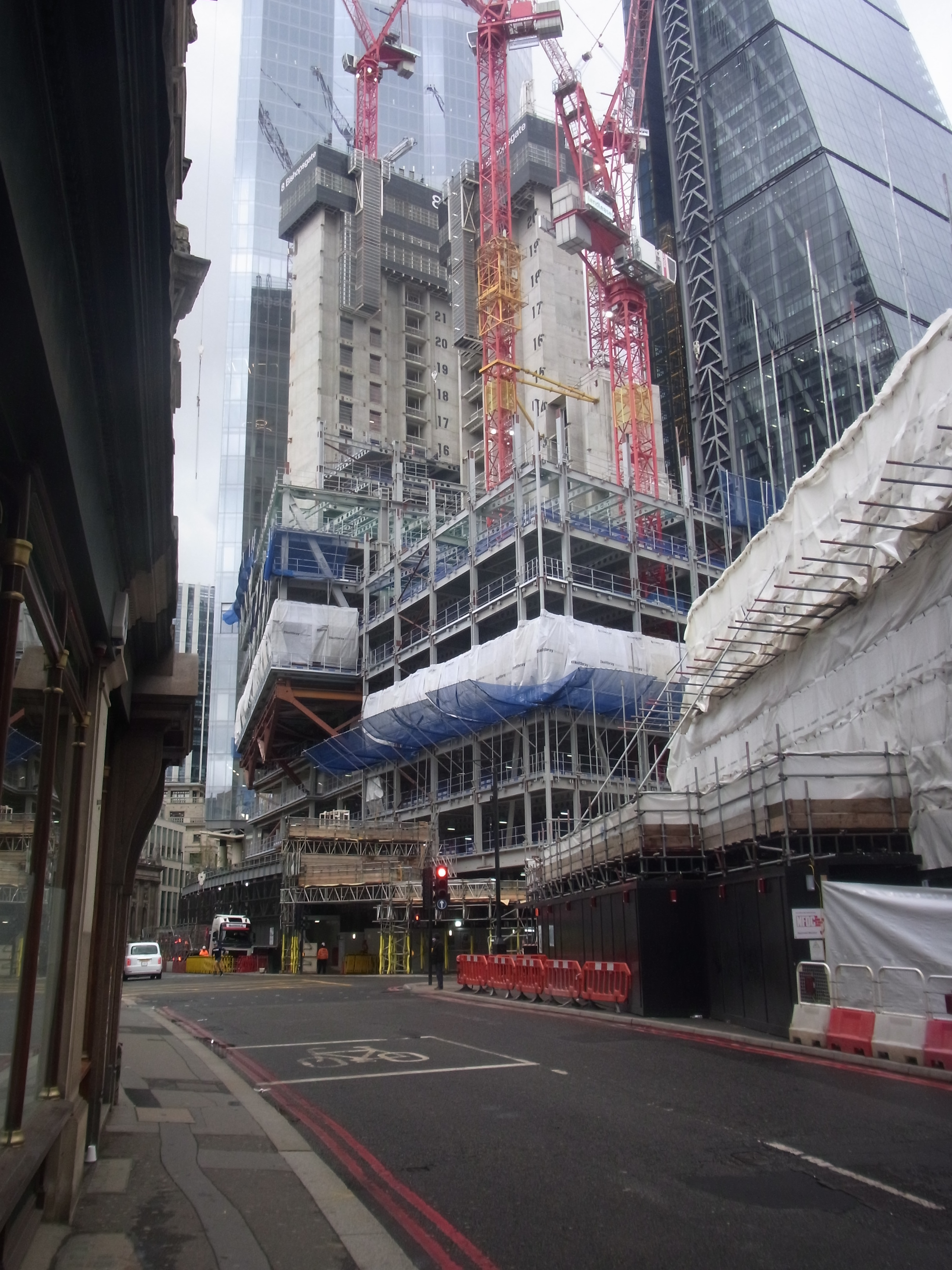
Street view of construction, May 2021

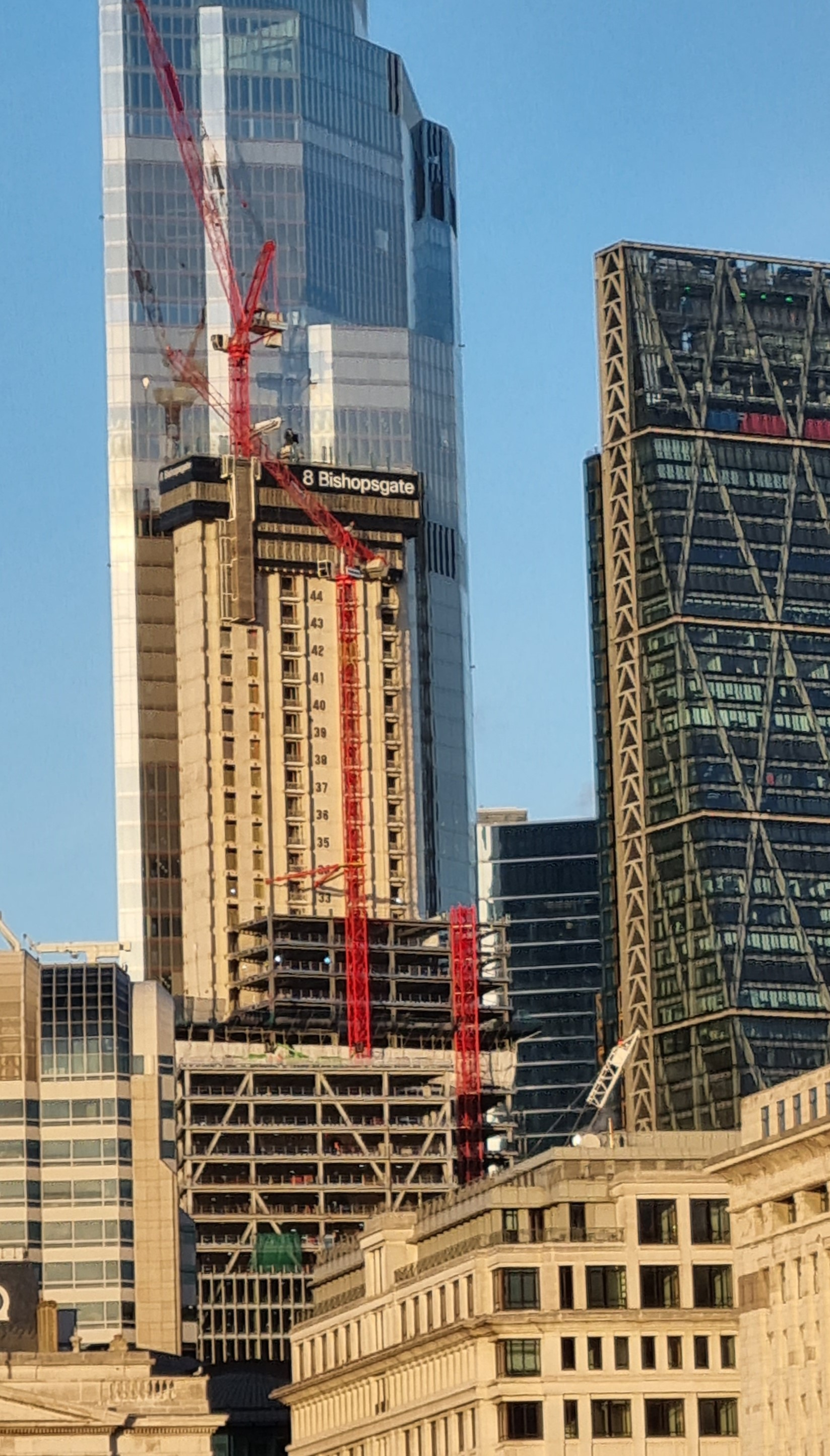
8 Bishopsgate in 2021

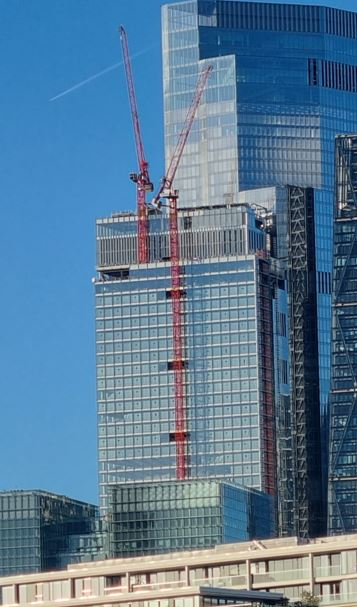
8 Bishopsgate in 2022

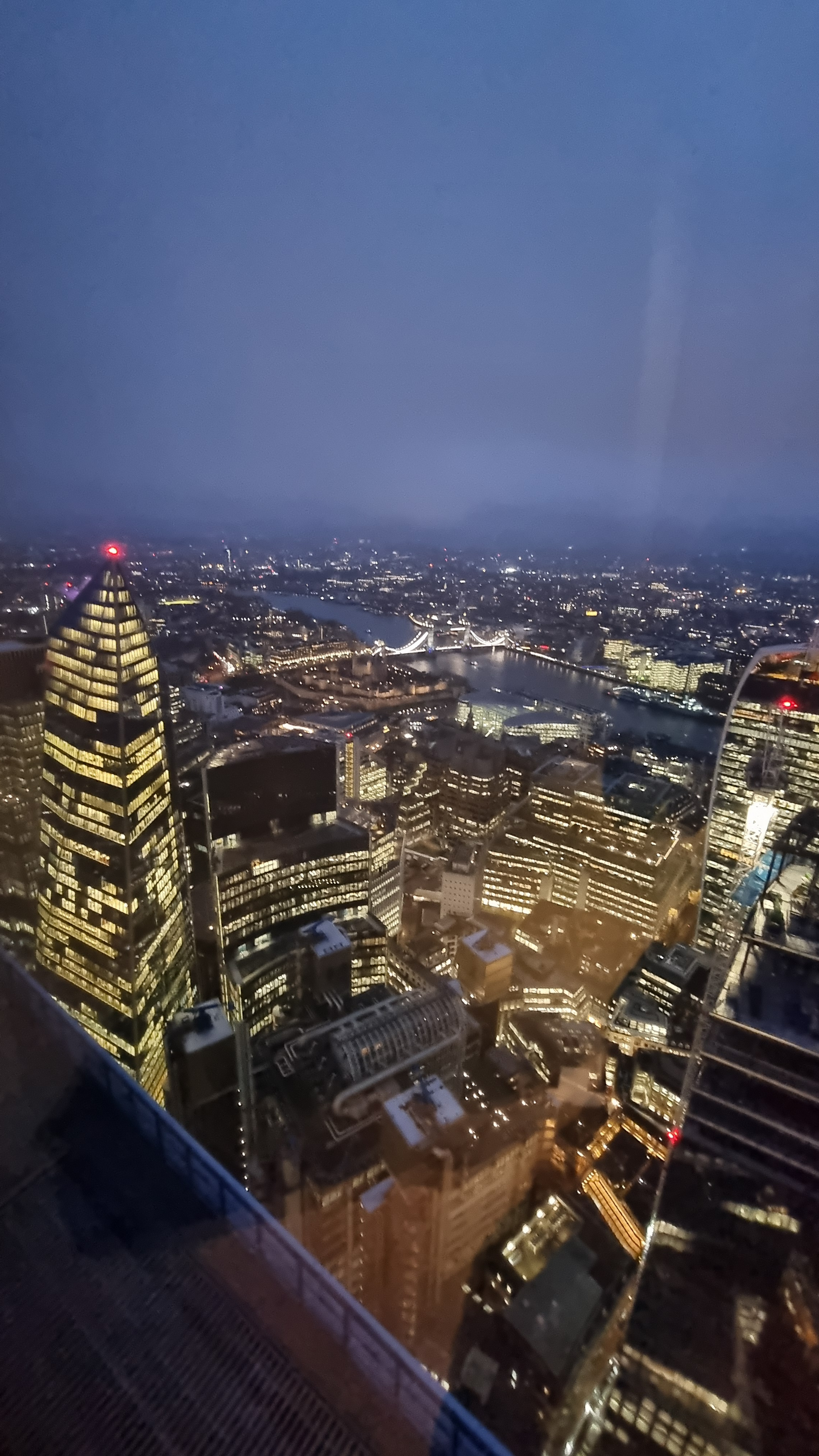
Southeastern view from 50th floor of 8 Bishopsgate, with The Scalpel (left)

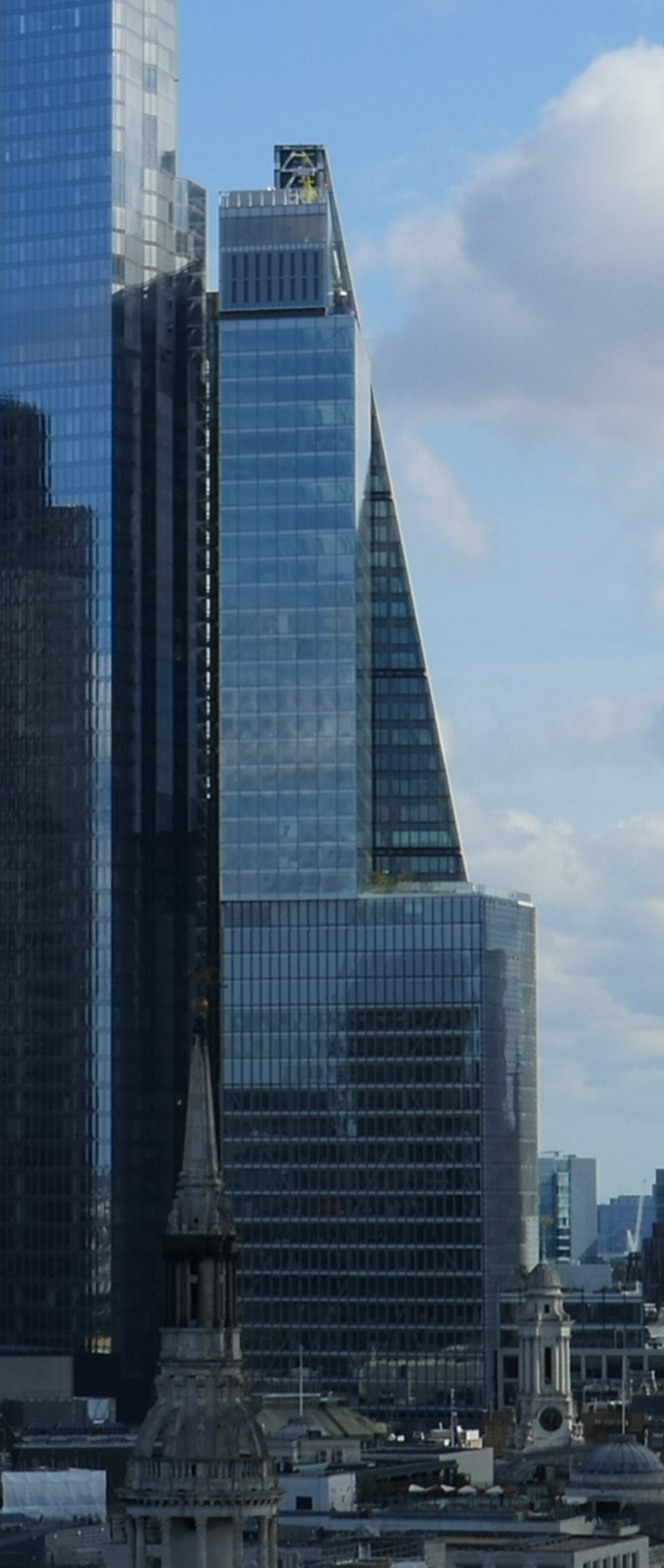
8 Bishopsgate viewed from St Paul's Cathedral

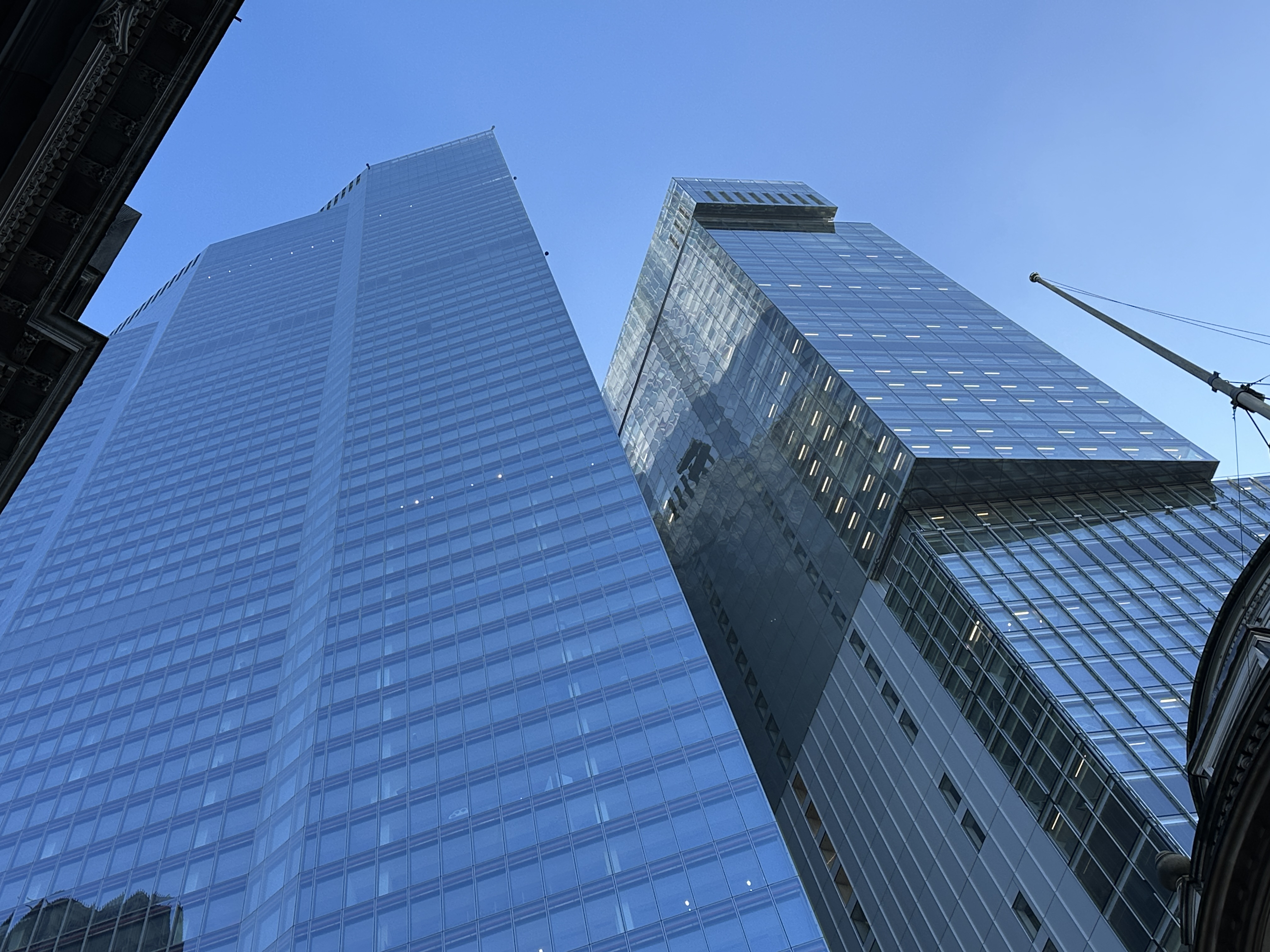
View of 22 Bishopsgate and 8 Bishopsgate from street level

== See also ==
- City of London landmarks
- List of tallest buildings and structures in London
