= Simon Halabi =

Syrian-born British property developer (born 1958)

- Born: Bassam Simon Halabi; August 1958 (age 68); Syria
- Citizenship: Syrian
- Spouse: Urte
- Children: 2 sons

Bassam Simon Halabi (Arabic: سيمون حلبي born August 1958) is a Syrian-born British businessman and property developer.

His wealth derived initially from his father, who was a successful businessman in Syria. His father played a crucial role in helping him establish his early ventures. Embarking on a series of speculative property ventures, Halabi amassed a sizeable fortune himself. In the Sunday Times Rich List 2007, he was ranked 14th richest person in Britain, while the Forbes list of global billionaires listed him at no. 194 in 2007, with an estimated net worth of US $4.3 billion. In 2009, Forbes ranked him no. 224 with a reduced net worth of US $2.8 billion. He was declared bankrupt in 2010.

Halabi has been described as "private" and "secretive", and does not give interviews. As of 2007, he had an extensive collection of houses, cars, and a 130-ft yacht. He changed his name to hide a rape conviction in France.

== Downfall and bankruptcy ==
In late 2007, the sports gym chain Esporta, which he had purchased for £460m, was forced into administration, costing Halabi at least £120m of his own money, and damaging his relationship with his main creditor, Société Générale.

In January 2008, Halabi sold his one-third stake in the flagship Shard development in London for £30m—a stake that had been valued at over £130m six months earlier. Later that year the Mentmore Towers project, which Halabi had purchased in 1997 with a view to turning it into a six-star hotel, ran into problems. The grade II listed building was mothballed, with essential maintenance work remaining undone as the project architects sued Halabi for unpaid fees. By 2008, English Heritage classed Mentmore Towers as "At Risk", due to likelihood of weather damage and lack work being carried out.

In June 2009, his group of property companies defaulted on $1.9 billion of bonds. The debts in question had been secured on nine London properties, which had fallen in value by up to 50% since the start of the Great Recession, leaving them in negative equity. In August 2009 insolvency specialists MCR were appointed as liquidators of Buckingham Securities Holdings, Halabi's principal client advisory vehicle.

By October 2009, Halabi's Anglo Swiss Holdings company began to liquidate assets including the attempted sale of Cambridge House in Piccadilly, in central London, previously the premises of the Naval and Military Club. On 1 April 2010, he was declared bankrupt in the High Court in London.

By 2010, Mentmore Towers development was still part of his property portfolio, although the scale of planned development for the property was much reduced. Plans no longer included the large extension with spa and conference facilities. As of 2022, a report described it as "abandoned" and "left to rot". Château Cantenac-Brown, a winery in the Bordeaux region of France, was sold by Halabi in December 2019.

Aviva Tower, part of Halabi's White Tower portfolio, was eventually sold for £288m in April 2011; it had been purchased in 2003 for £260m.

== Personal life ==
Halabi is married to Lithuanian-born Urte Halabi. They had two sons, Samuel and Jacob; Samuel died aged two in August 2003 in a pool accident in France.

Halabi was convicted of sexual assault in France in 1998. The attack occurred at his house in France, against a woman whom he had trapped and threatened to kill if she reported the crime. Though Halabi was handed a three-year prison sentence, suspended for five years, and placed on a sex offender list in France, he was able to continue his life and business dealings unchecked as he had been convicted under the name Mohammed Halabi instead of his actual name. While the conviction was shared with UK authorities under data sharing agreements in 2012, the crime was not linked to Halabi until 2017.

In February 2015, he was accused of assaulting and racially abusing a binman in Hay's Mews, off London's Berkeley Square, after a refuse truck had blocked his Bentley outside Annabel's, allegedly calling him a "monkey" and a "peasant", and then shouting "I own this road, I can do what I want". In December 2016, following a near-two year investigation and a week long trial at Southwark Crown Court, he was acquitted of racially aggravated assault.
