= St Helen's (skyscraper) =

Commercial skyscraper in London, England

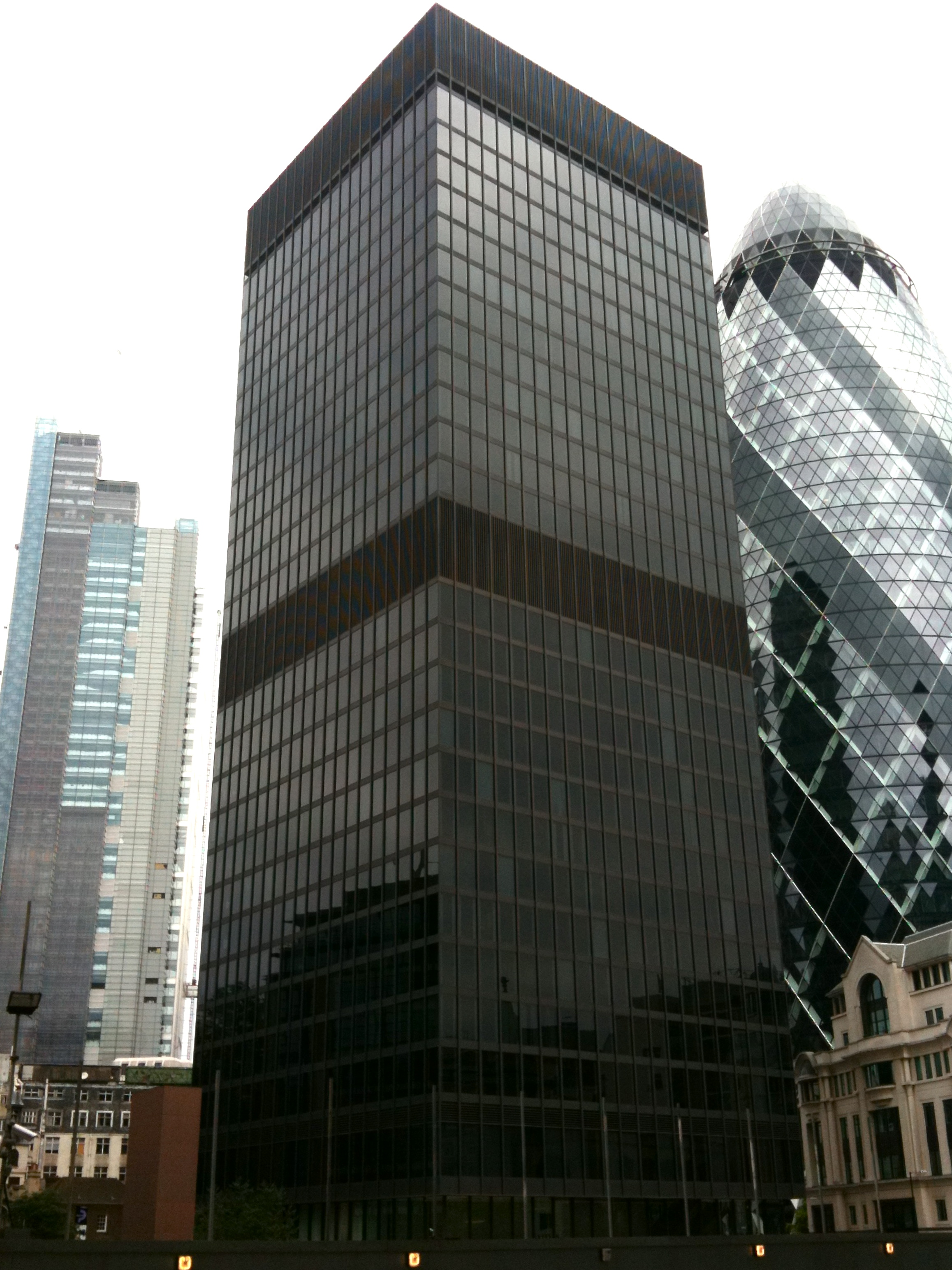
- Interactive map of the St Helen's area
- Former names: Aviva Tower, Commercial Union building

General information
- Type: Commercial
- Location: London, EC3; United Kingdom
- Coordinates: 51°30′52.2″N 00°04′54.8″W
- Construction started: 1968
- Completed: 1969; 57 years ago

Height
- Roof: 118 metres (387 ft)

Technical details
- Floor count: 28
- Floor area: 56,097 m^{2} (603,820 sq ft)

Design and construction
- Architect: Gollins Melvin Ward Partnership
- Developer: Commercial General Union
- Main contractor: Taylor Woodrow Construction

St Helen's (previously known as the Aviva Tower or the Commercial Union building) is a commercial skyscraper in London, United Kingdom. It is 118 metres (387 ft) tall and has 23 floors. The postal address is No. 1, Undershaft, though the main entrance fronts onto Leadenhall Street, in the City of London financial district.

The building was designed by the Gollins Melvin Ward Partnership in the international style: the stark rectilinear geometry and detailing of the building was influenced by Ludwig Mies van der Rohe and is somewhat reminiscent of his Seagram Building in New York City. It was built by Taylor Woodrow Construction as one of only four high-rise buildings in London using a top-down engineering design where the lower office floors are suspended from above rather than supported from below.

In 1992, the building was heavily damaged in the Baltic Exchange bombing carried out by the Provisional IRA, as a result of which it was substantially renovated.

The building was sold in 2003 by the Abu Dhabi Investment Authority to property developer Simon Halabi. In 2007, it was reported that Halabi was considering plans to demolish the building and replace it with a much taller tower, but this plan was not fulfilled. In 2011, it was reported that the building had been sold to an undisclosed Far Eastern private investor for £288 million. Plans for the site submitted in February 2016 feature a 310 m (1,020 ft) tall, 72-floor tower largely given to office space. In November 2016, planning permission was granted for the Trellis Tower, which will house up to 10,000 workers and which, upon completion, would have been the tallest building in the City of London and the second tallest building in the UK, after The Shard, but this design was ultimately discarded in favour of a quad-segmented tower (1 Undershaft or One London), first revealed in August 2023.

Demolition of the building began in early 2025, following approval of the redevelopment plans in December 2024. Once demolition is completed, this will be the tallest skyscraper ever demolished in London. The only taller building ever dismantled in London was the Old St Paul's Cathedral after the Great Fire of London in 1666. It stood at an estimated 150 metres.

== History ==
=== Design and development ===
In 1961, the Commercial Union Assurance Company had acquired a site in St Mary Axe, in the City of London, which it desired to develop as its new headquarters. The site comprised adjacent properties in St Mary Axe and the former Shell building in Great St Helens. At the same time, the Peninsular and Oriental Steam Navigation Company was planning to redevelop its city offices in Leadenhall Street.

Due to a number of issues affecting both sites, notably poor access to the Commercial Union site and the restricted width of the Peninsular and Oriental site, it was not possible to obtain planning consents that would optimise the amount of floor space desired by either company. As a result, the two companies decided to participate in a joint development that would involve the reallocation of site boundaries and the creation of an open concourse area at the junction of Leadenhall Street and St Mary Axe. Both companies were to have frontages on the new concourse and would retain site areas equivalent to those enclosed by the original boundaries.

The architect for the project was the Gollins Melvin Ward Partnership, who acknowledged the influence of Mies van der Rohe. The design was an elongated cube in the modernist international style. The original cladding (apart from the windows) was anodidized aluminium, whose colour changed in varying lighting conditions from dark grey to dark bronze.

The tower has 24 usable office floors. In addition there are two double-height plant floors; the boiler rooms on one of the plant floors also serviced the neighbouring Peninsular and Oriental building. The floor-to-site-area ratio is 5.5:1. There were five underground levels, providing the staff restaurant, garage and three levels of storerooms and strongrooms.

Below the lowest office floor, the design was broken by an open podium which was designed to provide elevated pedestrian access via the City of London Pedway Scheme. Pedway was an ambitious but ultimately unfulfilled scheme to improve traffic flow in the City of London by means of the construction of a network of elevated pedestrian walkways. From the mid-1960s to the 1980s, developers of major sites were required to provide access to the Pedway network as a condition of obtaining planning consent. The requirement was unpopular with designers, who regarded the results as visually unappealing unused space that often provided pedestrians with dead ends. In the case of this development, a podium-level walkway was constructed that linked the Commercial Union building with its neighbour, the Peninsular and Oriental building.

=== Construction ===
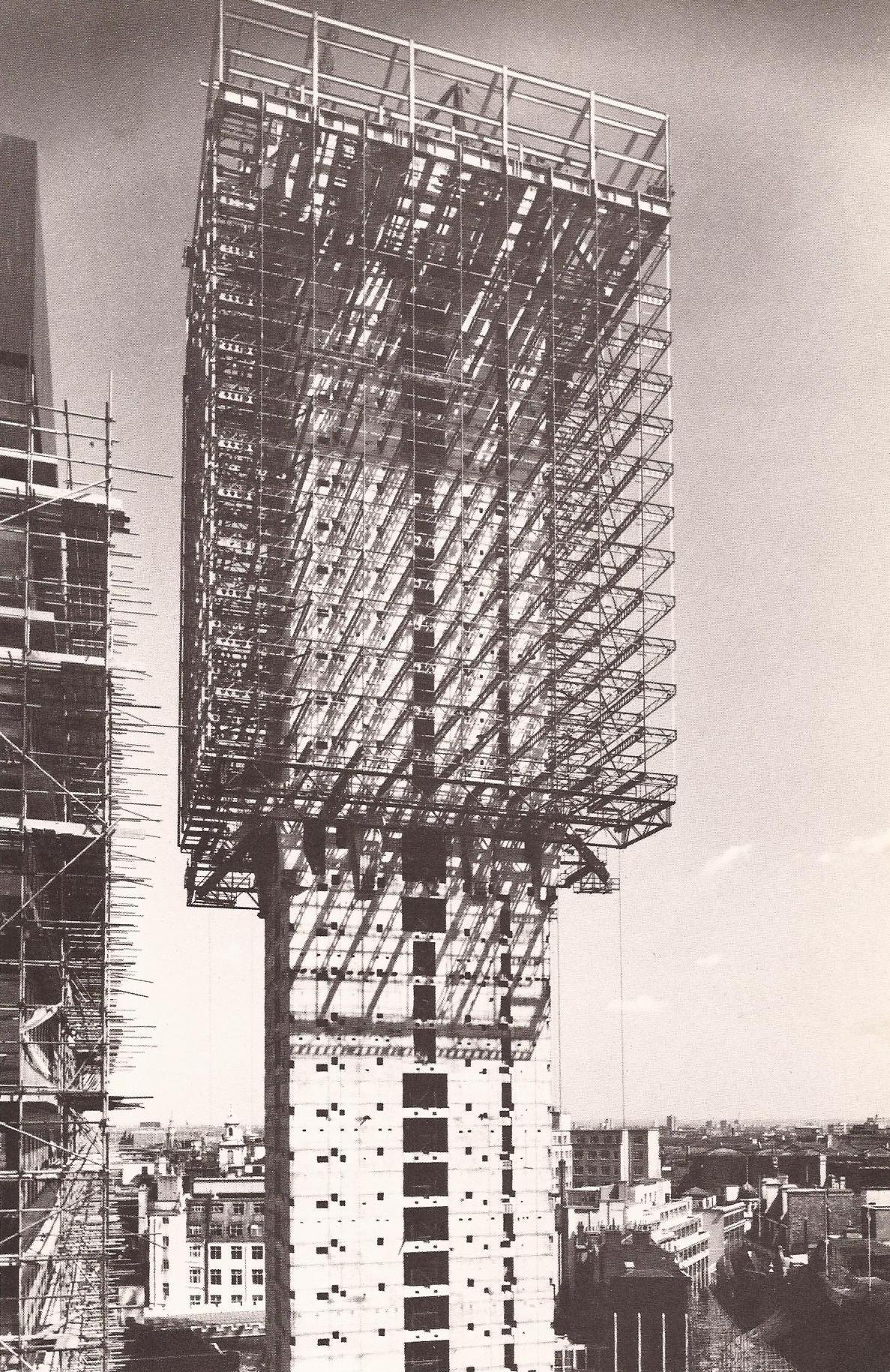
The Commercial Union building under construction in 1968. Office floors were suspended from steel trusses cantilevered from the mid- and roof-level plant floors

The construction of the Commercial Union building was undertaken by Taylor Woodrow Construction.

The structure comprises a central concrete service core, surrounded by a steel framework suspended from projecting steel truss sections at the mid- and roof-level plant floors. The office floors are suspended from these steel frameworks; the roof section supports twelve floors while the midsection supports 13 floors. The steel hangers are installed in alternate window mullions and vary in size: 0.23 m (9.1 in) × 0.05–0.23 m (2.0 in – 9.1 in). This suspended construction design was aimed at maximising floor space by largely eliminating the need for support columns.

The new piazza in front of the two new buildings was below street level, and steps were constructed on two sides. Air intake louvres for ventilating the building's five sub-surface levels were built into the treads of the steps. The piazza was planted with semi-mature lime trees.

=== Awards ===
In 1970, the Commercial Union and Peninsular & Oriental buildings won the Civic Trust Award for townscape and design co-ordination. In the same year the Commercial Union building was awarded the Structural Steel Design Special Award, sponsored by the British Steel Corporation and the British Constructional Steelwork Association.
