= 122 Leadenhall Street =

Skyscraper in central London, England

Coordinates: 51°30′49.66″N 0°4′56.21″W

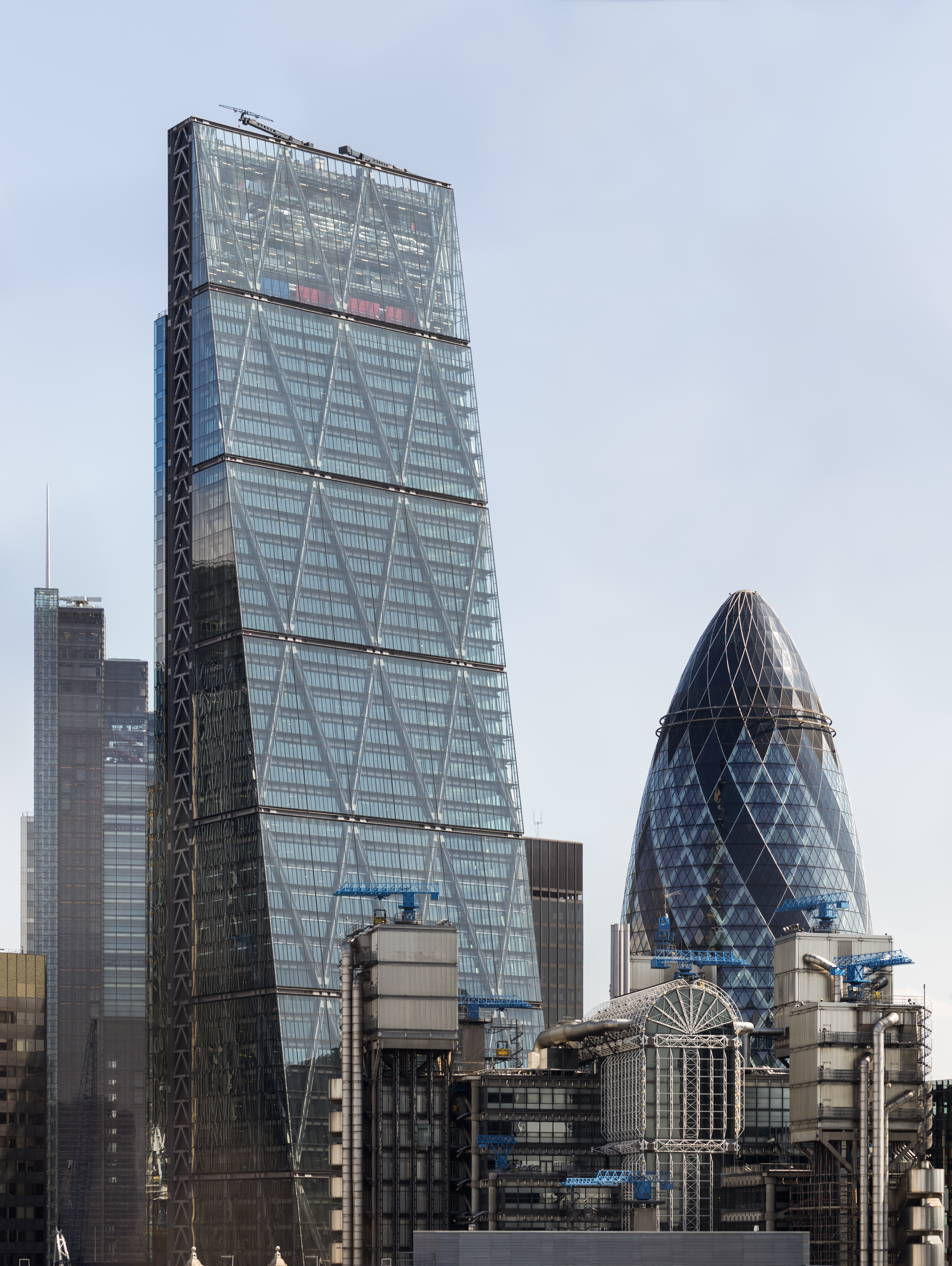
- Interactive map of the 122 Leadenhall Street area
- Alternative names: Leadenhall Building; The Cheesegrater; Leadenhall Tower

General information
- Status: Completed
- Type: Office
- Architectural style: Post-modern / Structural expressionism
- Location: London, EC3
- Completed: June 2013
- Opened: July 2014; 12 years ago
- Cost: £1.15 billion
- Owner: C C Land

Height
- Roof: 225 metres (738 ft)

Technical details
- Floor count: 48
- Floor area: 84,424 m^{2} (908,730 sq ft)

Design and construction
- Architecture firm: Rogers Stirk Harbour + Partners
- Structural engineer: Arup
- Services engineer: Arup

Website
- www.theleadenhallbuilding.com

122 Leadenhall Street, also known as the Leadenhall Building, Leadenhall Tower or informally the Cheesegrater, is a 225-metre-tall (738 ft) skyscraper in central London. It opened in July 2014 and was designed by Rogers Stirk Harbour + Partners. The informal name references its wedge shape similar to the kitchen utensil.

The building adjoins the Lloyd's Building, also designed by Richard Rogers. The previous, 1960s building on the site was owned by British Land and had been designed by Gollins Melvin Ward. By December 2009, the site was cleared but construction stalled because of the 2008 financial crisis. The project was revived in 2010 by Oxford Properties in partnership with British Land.

== Site history ==
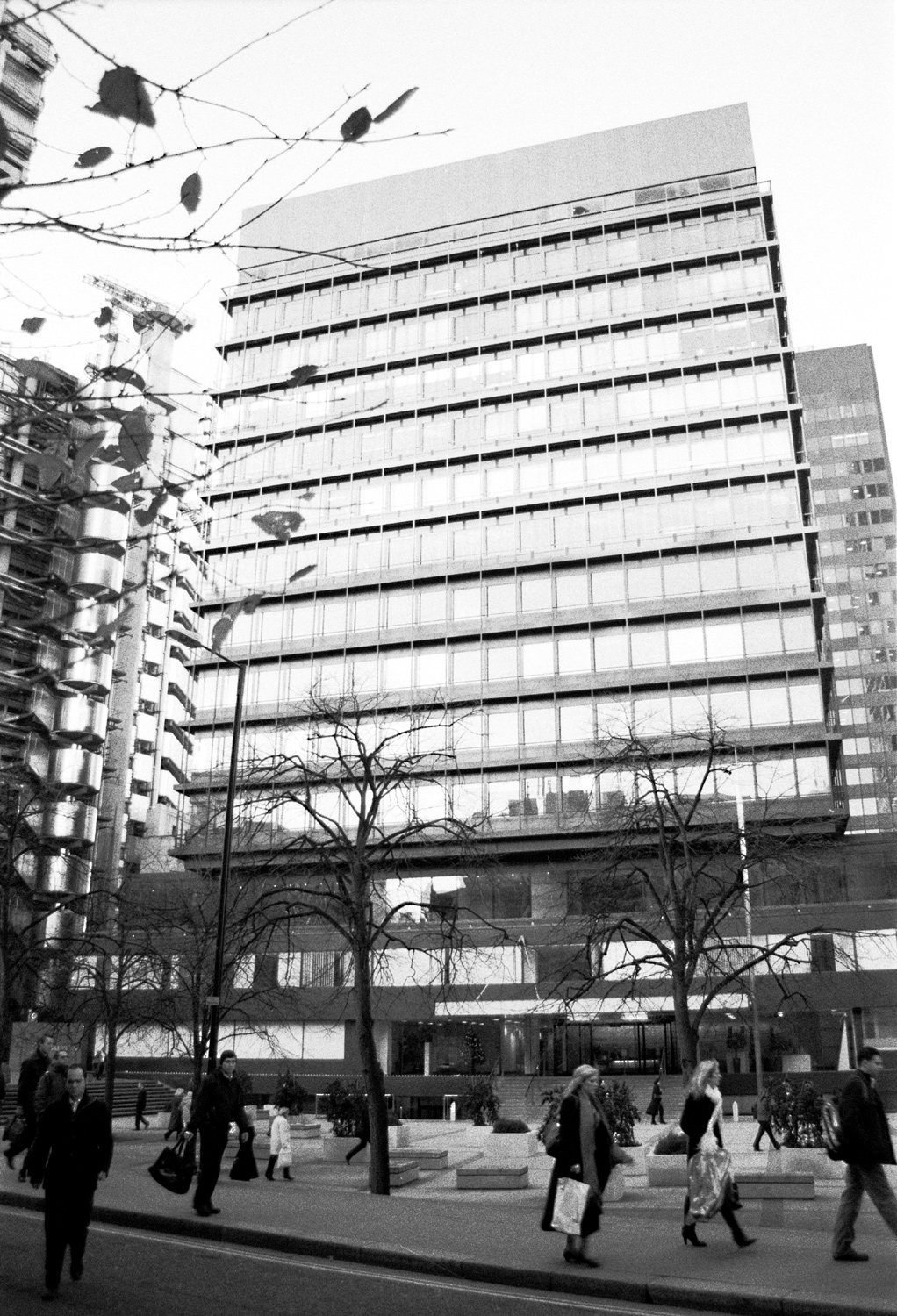
The 1969 building in 2007

=== P&O ===
From 1840, P&O had occupied the offices of Willcox & Anderson. However, business east of the Gulf of Suez increased in the late 1840s, so it needed larger offices. In 1845, the company purchased the King's Arms inn and hotel at 122 Leadenhall Street for £7,250. A new office building on the site cost it about £8,000 and opened in 1848.

In 1854, the company expanded its offices with a lease on 121 Leadenhall Street, and further 80 year leases from St Thomas's Hospital on dwellings at 123, 124 and 125 which were demolished to create a new frontage for 122.

By the mid-1960s, the company sought more office space from its narrow site. Commercial Union Assurance Company planned a redevelopment on the adjacent site at the corner of St Mary Axe but that had poor access. To achieve a satisfactory planning consent and optimise floor space the two companies carried out a joint development, with adjustment of boundaries, and creation of an open concourse at the junction of Leadenhall Street and St Mary Axe.

=== 1969 building ===
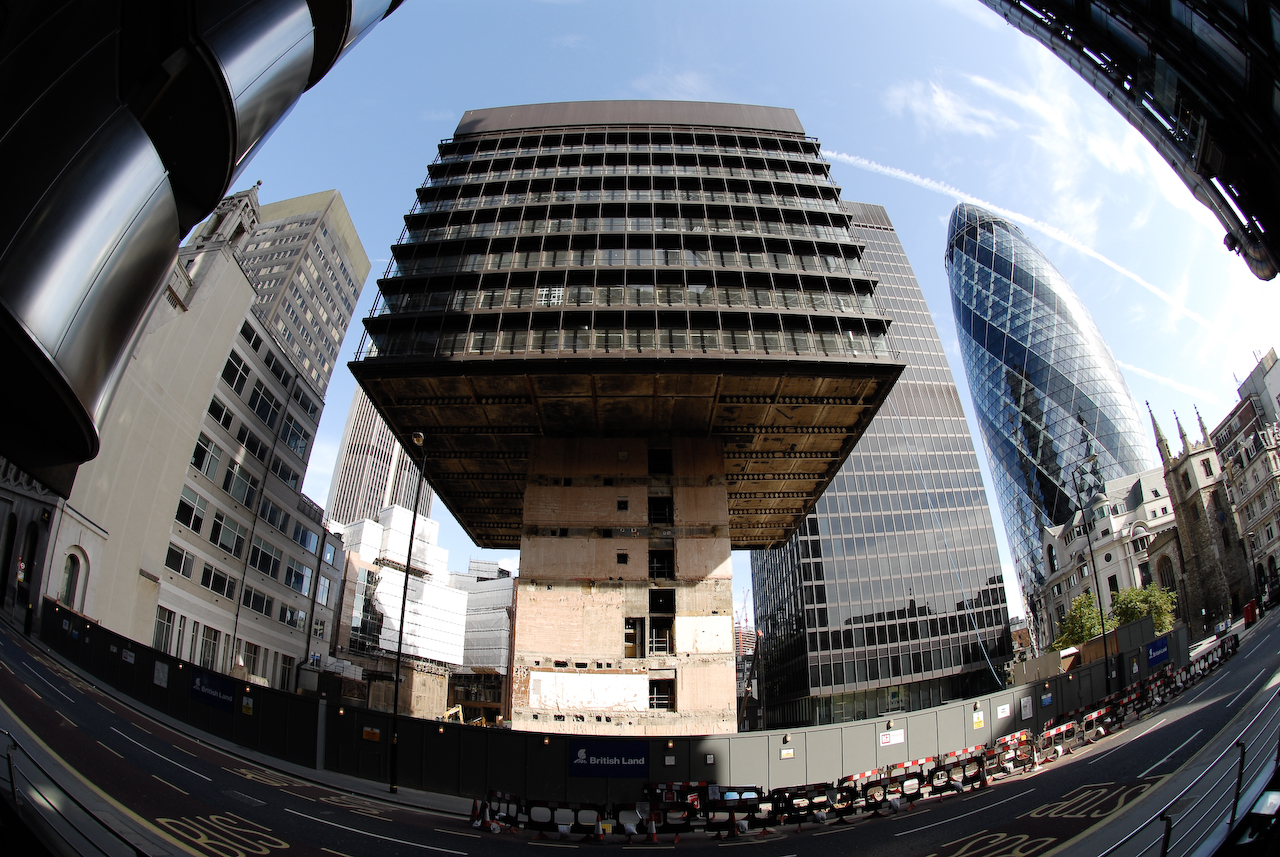
The 1969 building being demolished in 2007

Gollins Melvin Ward's 1969 building at 122 Leadenhall Street was 54 m (177 ft) tall with 14 storeys above grade and three below. It matched Commercial Union's new, adjacent headquarters, later St Helen's. The building had a central, compressional concrete core and suspended floors hung using steel 'chords', visible on the exterior, themselves hung from power trusses at the top of the building. The architect acknowledged the influence of Mies van der Rohe.

The building was extensively damaged by an IRA bomb in the early-1990s and subsequently had to be reclad. Tenants included the Italian International Bank and Calyon.

In 2007–08, McGee contracted to demolish the building for £16 million. After stripping the interior and removal of low level structures, the suspended parts of the building had to be dismantled floor by floor from the bottom.

== The Leadenhall Building ==
The Leadenhall Building

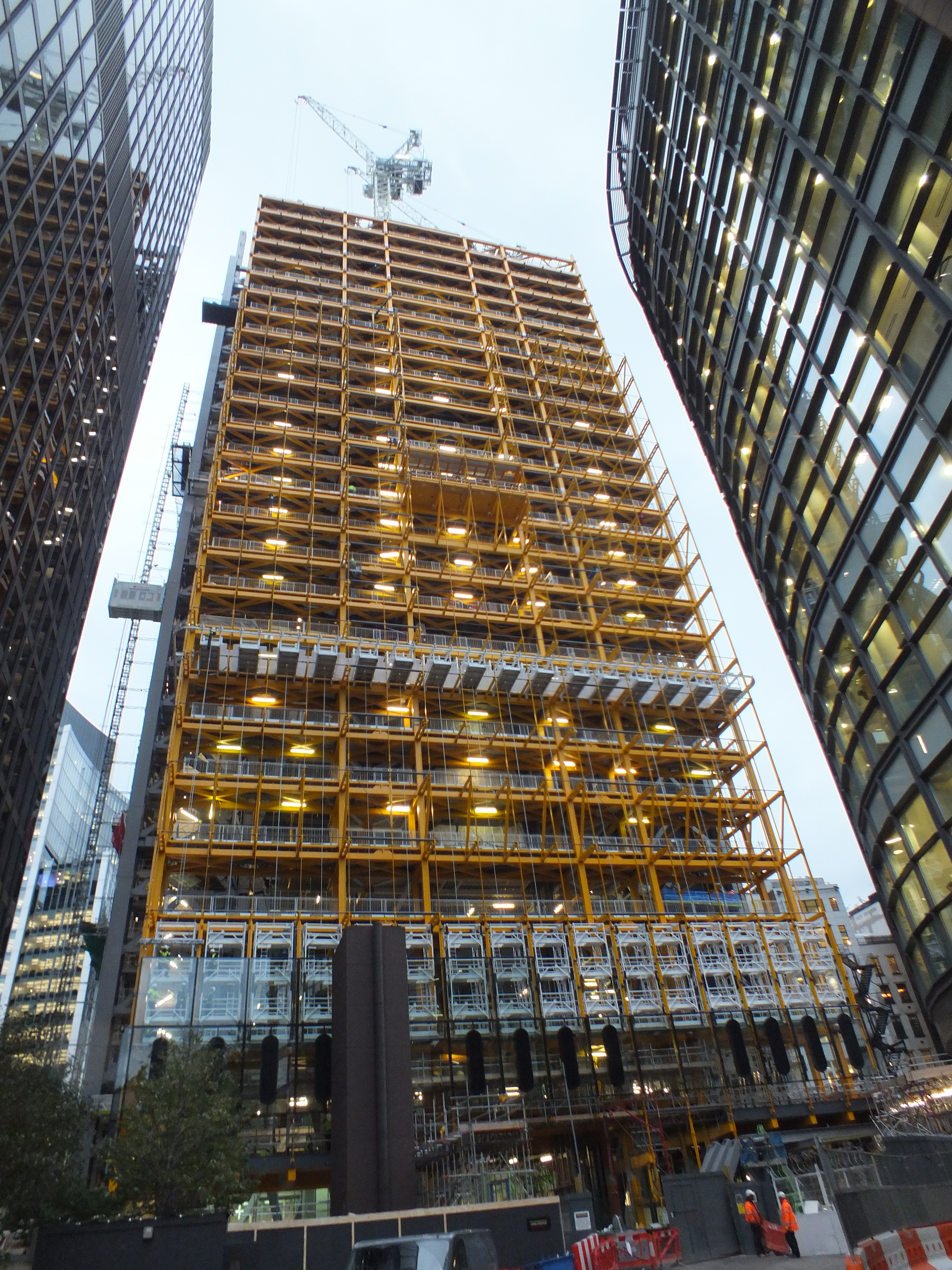
During construction

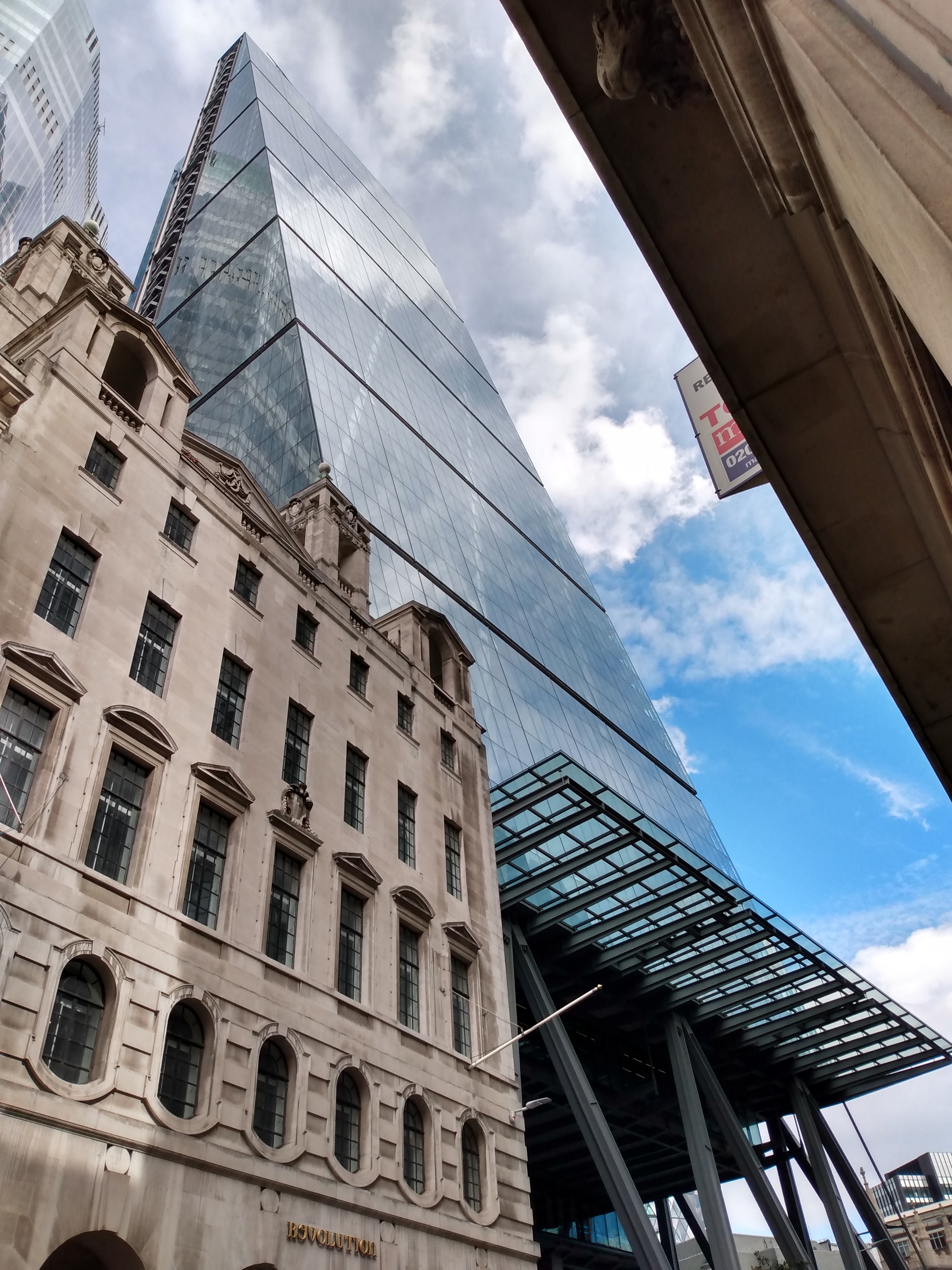
From the ground

Designed by Richard Rogers and developed by British Land and Oxford Properties, the new Leadenhall Building is 225 m (737 ft) tall, with 48 floors. With its distinctive wedge-shaped profile it has been nicknamed the Cheesegrater, a name originally given to it by the City of London Corporation's chief planning officer, Peter Rees, who upon seeing a model of the concept "told Richard Rogers I could imagine his wife using it to grate parmesan. [The name] stuck."

The planning application was submitted to the City of London Corporation in February 2004 and was approved in May 2005. In 2006 Scheme Design (RIBA Stage D) started. In a statement made to the London Stock Exchange on 14 August 2008, British Land said it was delaying the project, which was due to start in October 2010. On 22 December 2010, the developer announced the project was moving forward with contracts being signed for the 50/50 joint venture with Oxford Properties.

The new tower features a tapered glass façade on one side which reveals steel bracings, along with a ladder frame to emphasise the vertical appearance of the building. It also appears to anchor the tower to the ground, giving a sense of strength. Unlike other tall buildings, which typically use a concrete core to provide stability, the steel "Megaframe", engineered by Arup, provides stability to the entire structure and is the world's tallest of its kind. The base features a 30m high atrium which is open to the public and extends the adjacent plaza. The flat side of the building is also encased in glass, and houses the mechanical services – in particular the elevator shafts. These have been turned into an architectural feature, similar to the neighbouring Lloyd's Building – they deliberately display the elevator machinery, with bright orange counterweights and elevator motors.

This unusual design's main drawback is the building's relatively small floorspace (84,424 m^{2}) for a building of its height. It is hoped that the slanting wedge-shaped design will have less impact on the protected sightline of St Paul's Cathedral when viewed from Fleet Street and the west.

In July 2011, British Land and Oxford Properties announced that Laing O'Rourke was the main contractor for the works of the new Leadenhall Building. Throughout 2011, construction began with the basement floors. By December 2012, the steelwork had progressed up to the fifth mega-level, with topping out expected in February or March. The glass cladding had also begun to rise. In May 2013, the co-developers announced that the building was over 51% pre-let. By June 2013, the steelwork of the building was completely topped out with the glass cladding covering almost half the building.

The construction of the building was the subject of an episode of the Super Skyscrapers documentary series by the American television channel PBS in February 2014.

In November 2014, two embrittled bolts broke and fell from the building. Another descended in January 2015. Severfield, who had supplied and erected the building's structural steel, announced a £6 million charge for remediation works that were settled in 2019. Severfield had already booked £9.9 million of losses on the project in 2012. Leeds-based Andrews Fasteners Ltd, which went into administration, supplied the 3,000 defective 'megabolts', each the size of a human arm. A majority were replaced. Severfield had not used the bolts before and its chief executive said it would be unlikely to do so in the future.

During the 2017 redevelopment of nearby 22 Bishopsgate, a suspended girder struck the 122 Leadenhall Street building. Severfield was also the steel frame subcontractor to Multiplex's Bishopsgate site. Nobody was hurt.

=== Tenants ===
Floors	Space designation
45	DTEK
44	Affinity
43	Petredec
42	Landing Forty Two
40-41	FM Global
39	Brit Insurance
35–38	DRW Trading Group
31–34	Quadrature Capital
30	Servcorp
27–29	OMERS
26	Aegon
25	DRW Trading Group
19–24	MS Amlin
16–18	Brit Insurance
15	Virgin Money
14	RSHP
4–13	Aon
3	Bob Bob Ricard City (January 2019)
2	Reception
1	Aon
Mezzanine	Black Sheep Coffee
Ground	Black Sheep Coffee

The development has succeeded in attracting tenants, especially in contrast to the nearby part-built Pinnacle and completed Heron Tower. In May 2011, it was announced that the lower 10 floors of the Leadenhall Building have been pre-let to insurance broker Aon, which moved its global headquarters to London from Chicago. Insurance group Amlin has also agreed terms on a 20-year lease of the 19th to 24th floors as well as the top floor, the 45th, from March 2015, for a total of 111,000 sq ft of office space.

== See also ==
- City of London landmarks
- Leadenhall Market
- List of tallest buildings and structures in London
