= Church of St Mary Axe =

Coordinates: 51°30′52″N 0°04′52″W

St Mary Axe
- St Mary Axe
- Location: St Mary Axe, London
- Country: England
- Denomination: Anglican

History
- Founded: 1170

Architecture
- Demolished: 1565

St Mary Axe was a medieval church in the City of London. (The church that remains in the modern-day St Mary Axe is St Andrew Undershaft.) Its full name was St Mary, St Ursula and her 11,000 Virgins, and it was also sometimes referred to as St Mary Pellipar. Its common name (also St Mary [or Marie] at the Axe) derives from the sign of an axe over the east end of the church. The church's patrons were the Skinners' Company.

According to John Stow in A Survey of London (1603), the name derived from "the signe of an Axe, over against the East end thereof". However, a document dated to the early reign of King Henry VIII describes a holy relic held in the church; "An axe, one of the two that the eleven thousand Virgins were beheaded with". This refers to the legend that Saint Ursula, when returning to Britain from a pilgrimage to Rome accompanied by eleven thousand handmaidens, had refused to marry a Hunnish chief and was executed along with her whole entourage on the site of modern Cologne, in about 451 AD.

It was situated just north of Leadenhall Street on a site now occupied by Fitzwilliam House. First mentioned as St Mary apud Ax, it belonged for a time to the nearby Priory of St Helens. At the time of the Dissolution of the Monasteries it was still extant but in decline, and in 1562 it was offered to Spanish Protestant refugees as a place of worship. Three years later, however, it was unused and in a state of disrepair. Shortly afterwards it was pulled down and its parish was united with that of the neighbouring St Andrew Undershaft.

The church gave its name to a street of the same name, which links Leadenhall Street with Camomile Street and Houndsditch. No. 30 was the location of the Baltic Exchange until it was destroyed by an IRA bomb in 1992; the Exchange is now located at No. 38 just to the north of its former address. On the site of the old Baltic Exchange now stands 30 St Mary Axe, a skyscraper known colloquially as the Gherkin because of its distinctive shape.

The street of St Mary Axe was also the location of the sorcerer's shop in Gilbert and Sullivan's operetta The Sorcerer, which documents the former pronunciation "Simmery Axe".

The church that remains in the modern-day St Mary Axe is St Andrew Undershaft.
