= London Millennium Tower =

Defunct London skyscraper proposal

- Interactive map of the London Millennium Tower area

General information
- Status: Proposed, abandoned
- Type: Mixed-use
- Location: 14–34 St Mary Axe, City of London, London, United Kingdom
- Coordinates: 51.5145°N 0.0809°W
- Client: Trafalgar House

Height
- Roof: 386 m (1,266 ft)

Technical details
- Floor count: 92

Design and construction
- Architect: Foster + Partners
- Developer: Trafalgar House

The London Millennium Tower was one of several ideas for the site of the former Baltic Exchange at 30 St Mary Axe in the City of London, which had been destroyed beyond repair by a Provisional IRA bomb blast on 24 April 1992.

Designed by Foster + Partners for then owner Trafalgar House, the plan was for the building to be the tallest in Europe and the sixth-tallest in the world at that time, behind the twin Petronas Towers in Malaysia, the Sears Tower (now called the Willis Tower) in Chicago, and the twin towers of the World Trade Center in New York. Its height was planned at 386 m (1,266 ft), with 92 floors, which means it would have been 48th-tallest in the world as of 2023, and would be overtaken in Europe by the Federation Tower. A public viewing platform was planned for 1,000 ft (300 m) above ground level.

The plan featured a highly unorthodox floor layout, essentially two asymmetrical ellipses joined at one end. When the plans were unveiled in 1996, The Guardian newspaper coined the term "erotic gherkin" for the building, a name that others soon adopted (the name which stuck after the plan for the building was superseded, eventually becoming the nickname of 30 St Mary Axe, a different skyscraper that stands on the site today).

English Heritage had been one of the largest backers of the project until they withdrew their support due to Heathrow Airport objecting to the disruption that such a tall building would have on their flight paths. The project was eventually cancelled and the site was sold to Swiss Re, which created its headquarters, also designed by Foster + Partners.

The design for London Millennium Tower was later reworked into Foster + Partners' Bow Tower in Calgary, Canada, which, at 774 ft (236 m), was the tallest building in Calgary at the time of its completion.
