= St Mary Axe =

Street in the City of London

Coordinates: 51.5144°N 0.0810°W

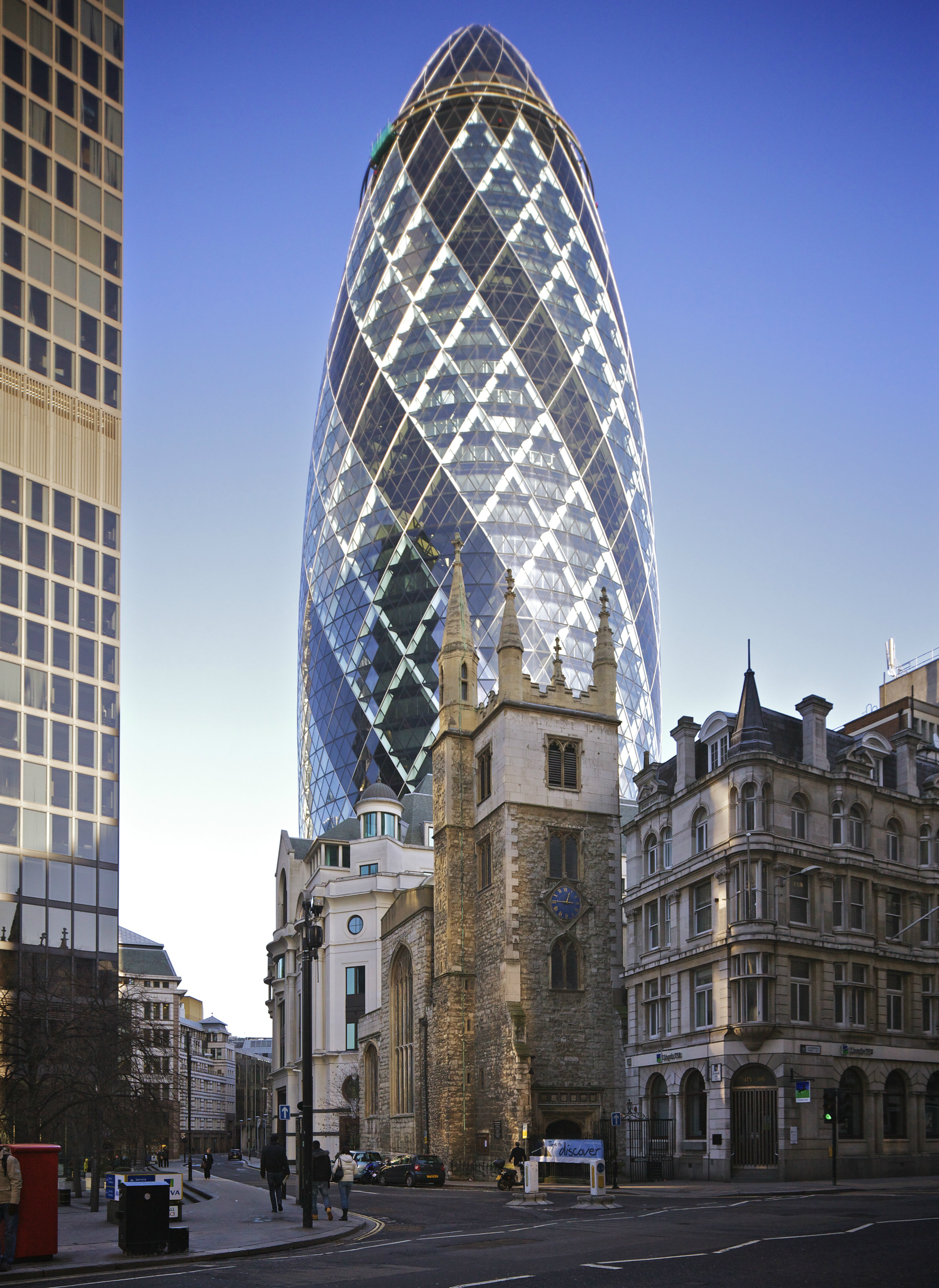
Looking north up St Mary Axe with The Gherkin in the background

St Mary Axe was a medieval parish in the City of London whose name survives as that of the street which formerly occupied it. The Church of St Mary Axe was demolished in 1561 and its parish united with that of St Andrew Undershaft, which is situated on the corner of St Mary Axe and Leadenhall Street. The site of the former church is now occupied by Fitzwilliam House, a fact acknowledged by a blue plaque on the building's façade. Nearby parishes include the medieval Great St Helen's (1210) and St Ethelburga (14th century).

The street name may derive from a combination of the church dedicated to the Virgin Mary and a neighbouring tavern which prominently displayed a sign with an image of an axe, or simply from the church name itself, which may have come from the axes used by the Worshipful Company of Skinners, who were patrons. The sign of an axe is reported to have been present over the east end of the church.

The street St Mary Axe is now most notable for the Baltic Exchange at No. 38, and The Gherkin at No. 30, a distinctively shaped skyscraper built on the site of the former buildings of the Baltic Exchange and the UK Chamber of Shipping (destroyed by an IRA bomb in 1992). The street originates at its northern end as a turn off Houndsditch, with traffic flowing one-way southbound, and it originates at its southern end as a turn off Leadenhall Street, with traffic flowing one-way northbound. Both one-way portions of St Mary Axe converge at Bevis Marks, where traffic is forced westward into Camomile Street.

Number 70 St Mary Axe appears in several novels by the British author Tom Holt as the address of a firm of sorcerers headed by J. W. Wells. This is itself a reference to Gilbert and Sullivan's The Sorcerer. In the song "My Name Is John Wellington Wells", the lyric renders his address as "Number Seventy, Simmery Axe"; this reflects the fact that some Londoners pronounce the street's name as "S'M'ry Axe" rather than enunciating it fully. The Tom Holt novels and The Sorcerer were written before the current office building at 70 St Mary Axe was constructed.
