= 70 St Mary Axe =

Office building in the City Of London

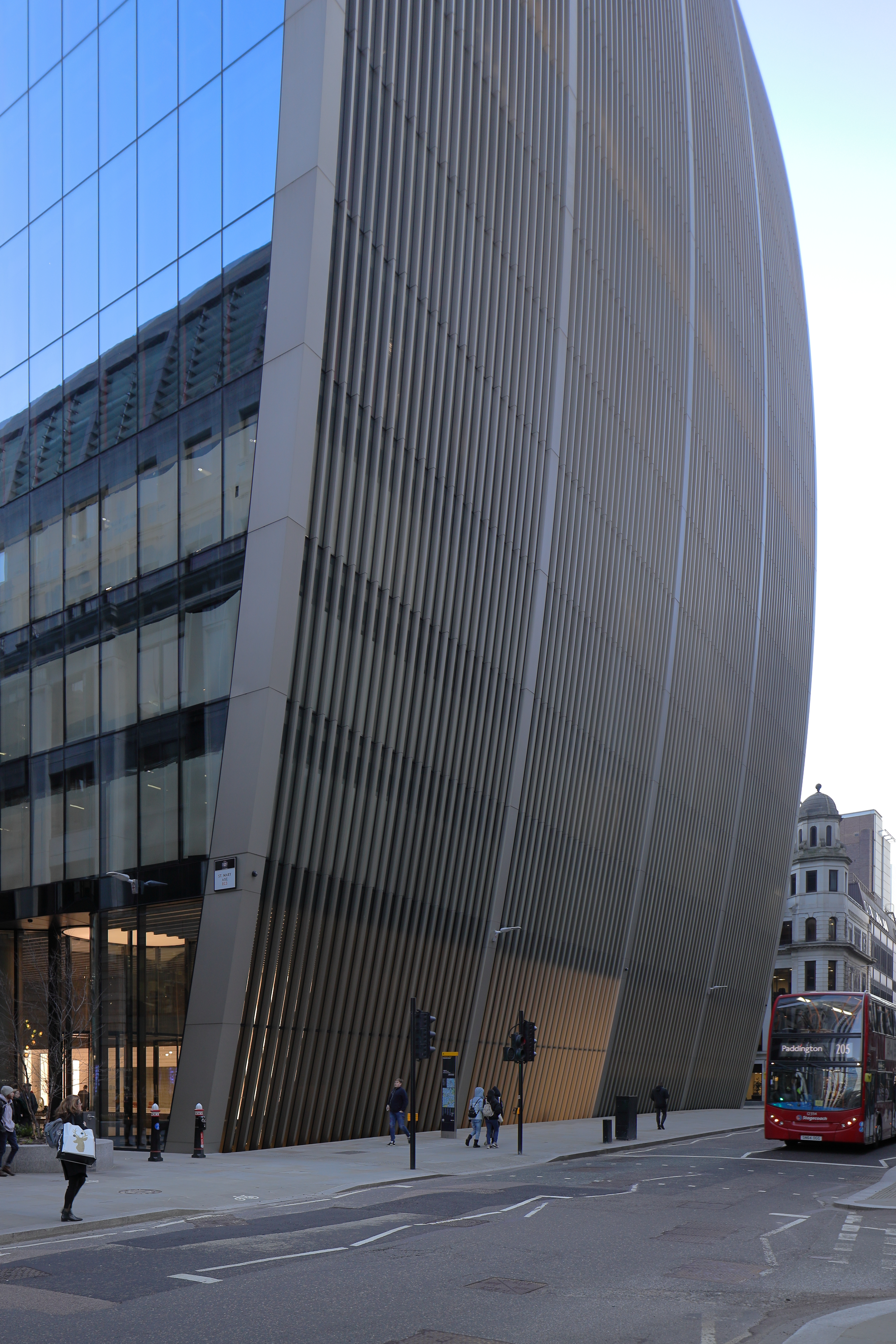
- Seen from Bevis Marks
- Interactive map of the 70 St Mary Axe area
- Alternative names: The Can of Ham

General information
- Status: Completed
- Type: Office
- Location: St Mary Axe, London, EC3
- Coordinates: 51°30′55″N 00°04′46″W
- Construction started: 2015
- Completed: 2019
- Opened: 2019
- Cost: £135m
- Owner: Nuveen

Height
- Roof: 90 metres (295 ft)

Technical details
- Floor count: 21 (above ground, including ground floor) plus two basement levels
- Floor area: 28,063.8 square metres (302,100 sq ft) (office space)

Design and construction
- Architect: Foggo Associates
- Structural engineer: Foggo Associates
- Main contractor: Mace Group Ltd

Website
- https://70stma.co.uk/

70 St Mary Axe, informally known as the Can of Ham due to its shape, is an office building in the City of London. It was completed in early 2019. With 21 floors above ground, it is 90 metres (295 ft) tall and offers 28,000 square metres (301,400 sq ft) of office space. During its construction, the City of London Corporation decided to pedestrianise the part of St Mary Axe along which the building sits, between Bevis Marks to the south-west and Houndsditch to the north-east.

== Development ==
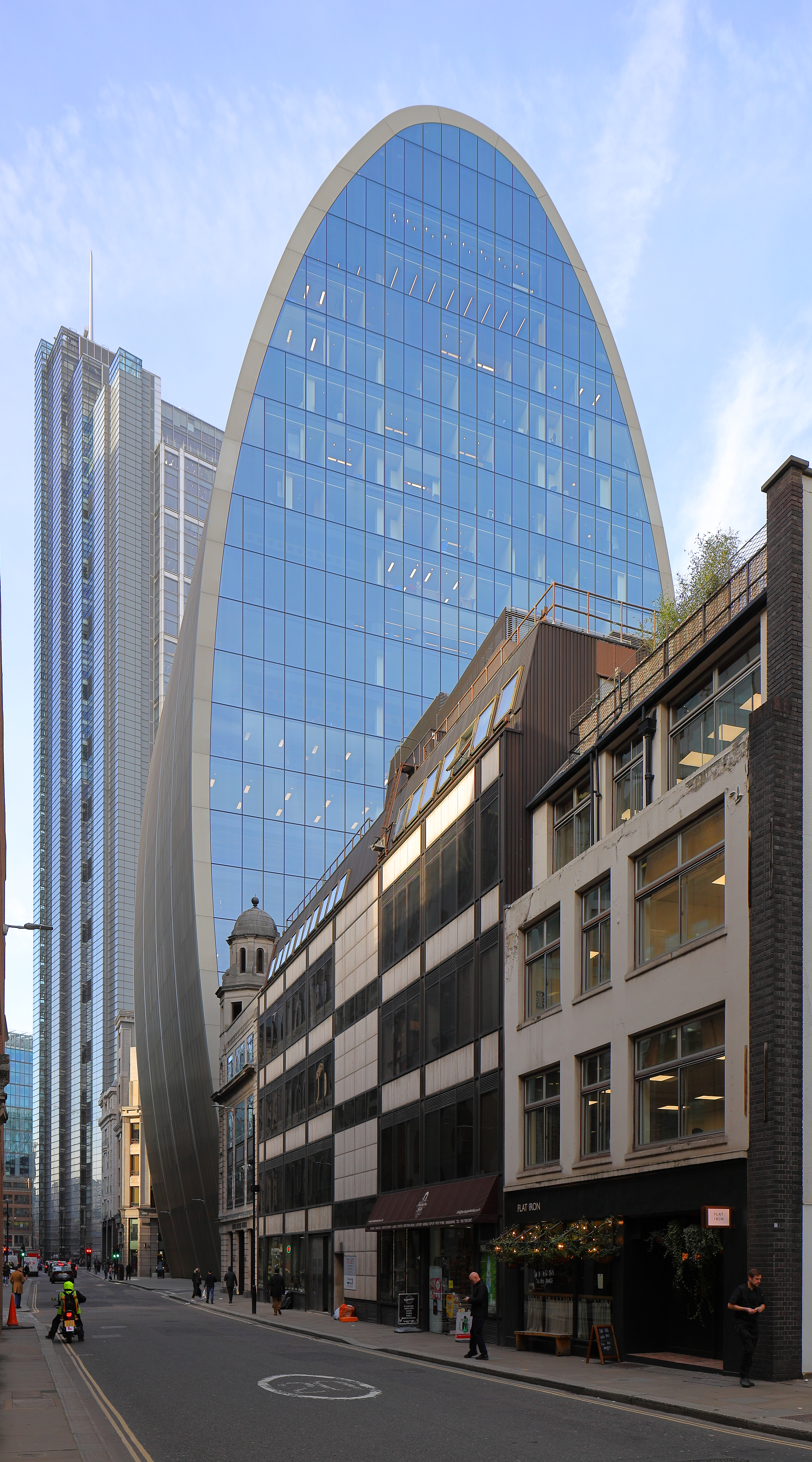
The profile is said to resemble a can of ham.

The architectural design was created by Foggo Associates for Targetfollow, and planning permission was granted in 2008. Targetfollow sold the site to Nuveen in 2011 for £20m but development was delayed during the 2008 financial crisis.

The sole tenant of 60 St Mary Axe agreed in 2014 to exit their lease early, and in 2015 Mace Group Ltd was appointed to build the project. Construction began that same year, and involved 400 workers, 90% of whom were employed through subcontractors.

During development, the project was criticised by some for its shape and its size.

Construction completed in Spring 2019, but the building did not open until later in the year.

== Subsequent sale ==
US private equity firm Blackstone aimed to buy 70 St Mary Axe from owner Nuveen, but the bid failed in December 2024 because Blackstone's offer of £300m was below Nuveen's £322m asking price. An earlier plan to sell for £400m in 2022 was also abandoned due to lack of interest.

In December 2025 it was announced that Nuveen had sold 70 St Mary Axe to Hayfin Capital Management and Capreon for a price of somewhere around £335m to £340m, with the purchase majority-funded by Hayfin, and debt financing provided by Santander and CaixaBank.

== In popular culture ==
=== Television ===
The building was used as the location for the interview stage in the 2019 and 2022 series of The Apprentice.

=== Theatre ===
The address, 70 St Mary Axe, was the location of the title character's offices in Gilbert and Sullivan's 1877 operetta The Sorcerer.

=== Literature ===
The address, 70 St Mary Axe, is a recurring location in the novels of Tom Holt, basing the use of the address on its previous use in Gilbert and Sullivan's The Sorcerer.
