= Limpus =

Limpus is a surname. Notable people with the surname include:

- Arthur Limpus (1863–1931), British Royal Navy officer
- Richard Limpus (1824–1875), British organist and composer
