= William Wimble =

English architect (1848–1903)

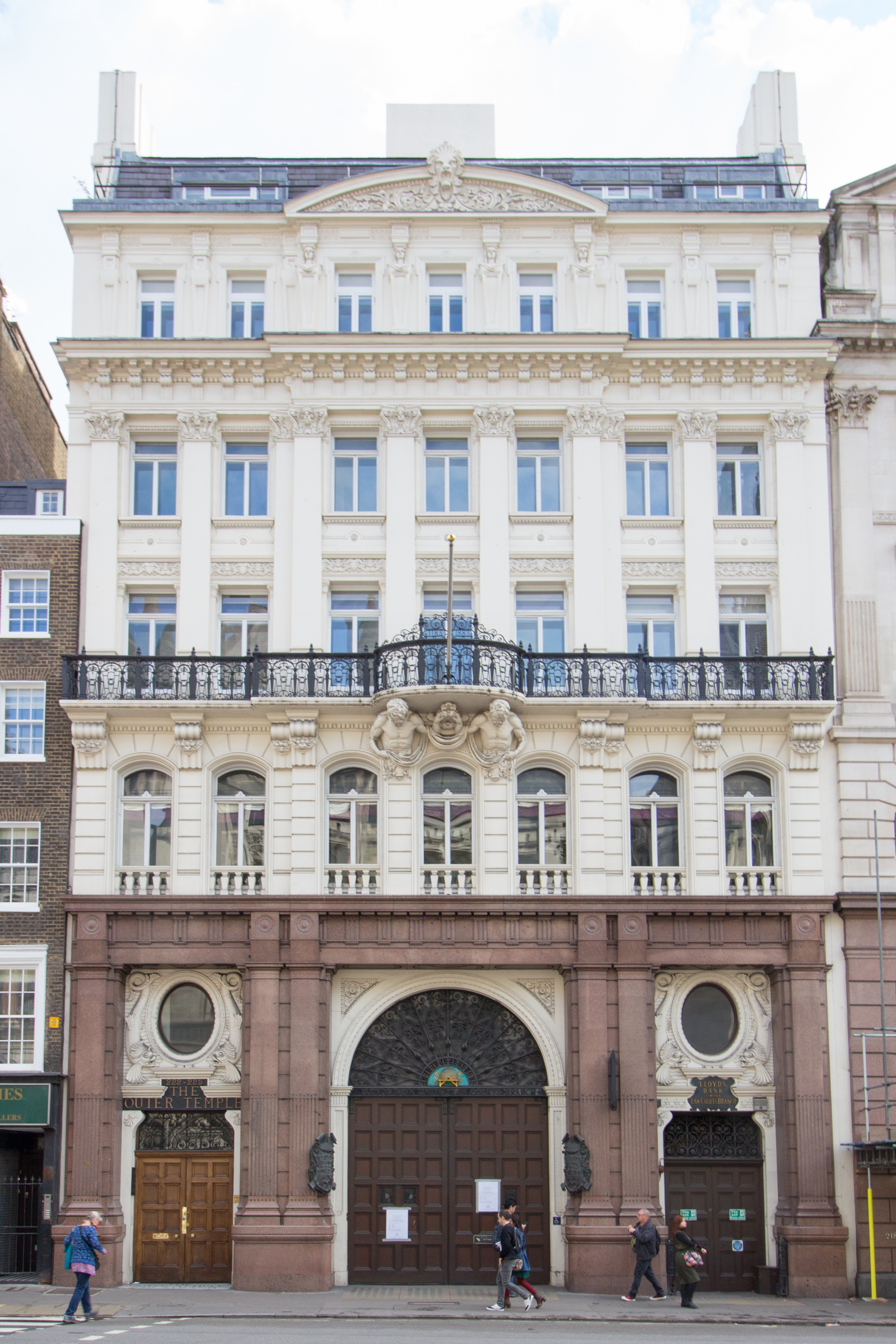
Former Lloyds Bank, 222 Strand, London 1882–83

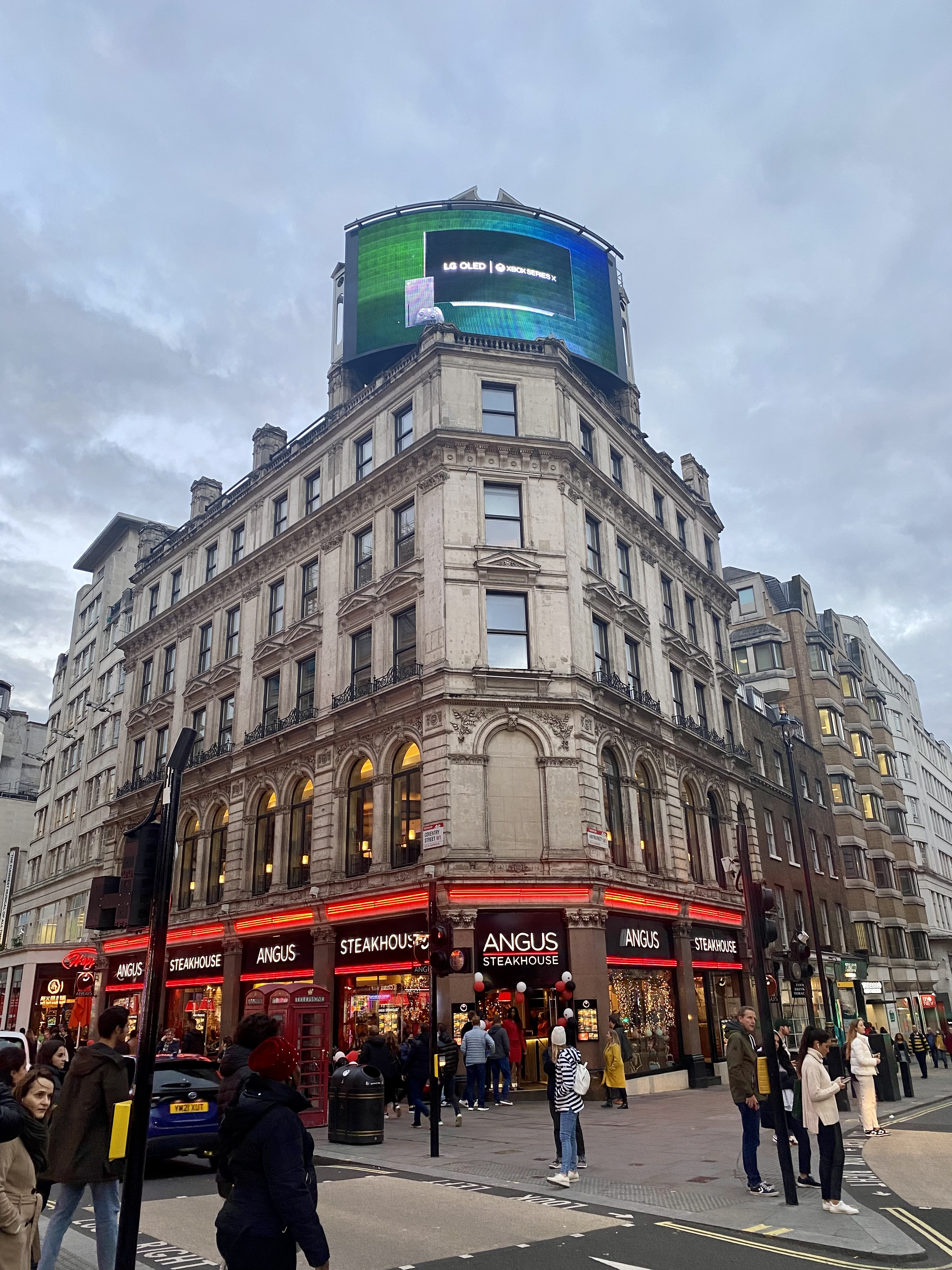
35 Haymarket, London 1884

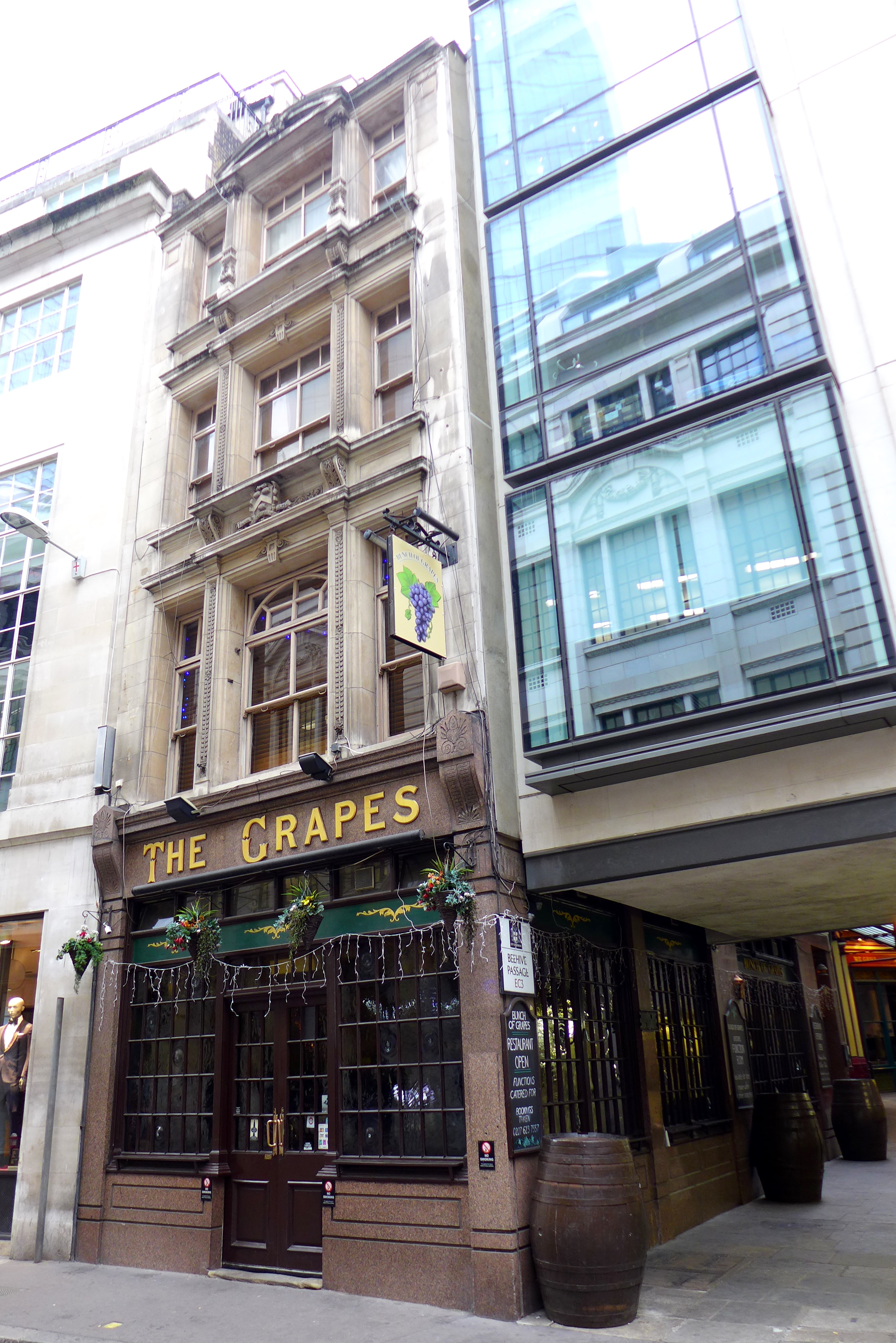
The Bunch of Grapes, Lime Street, London 1893

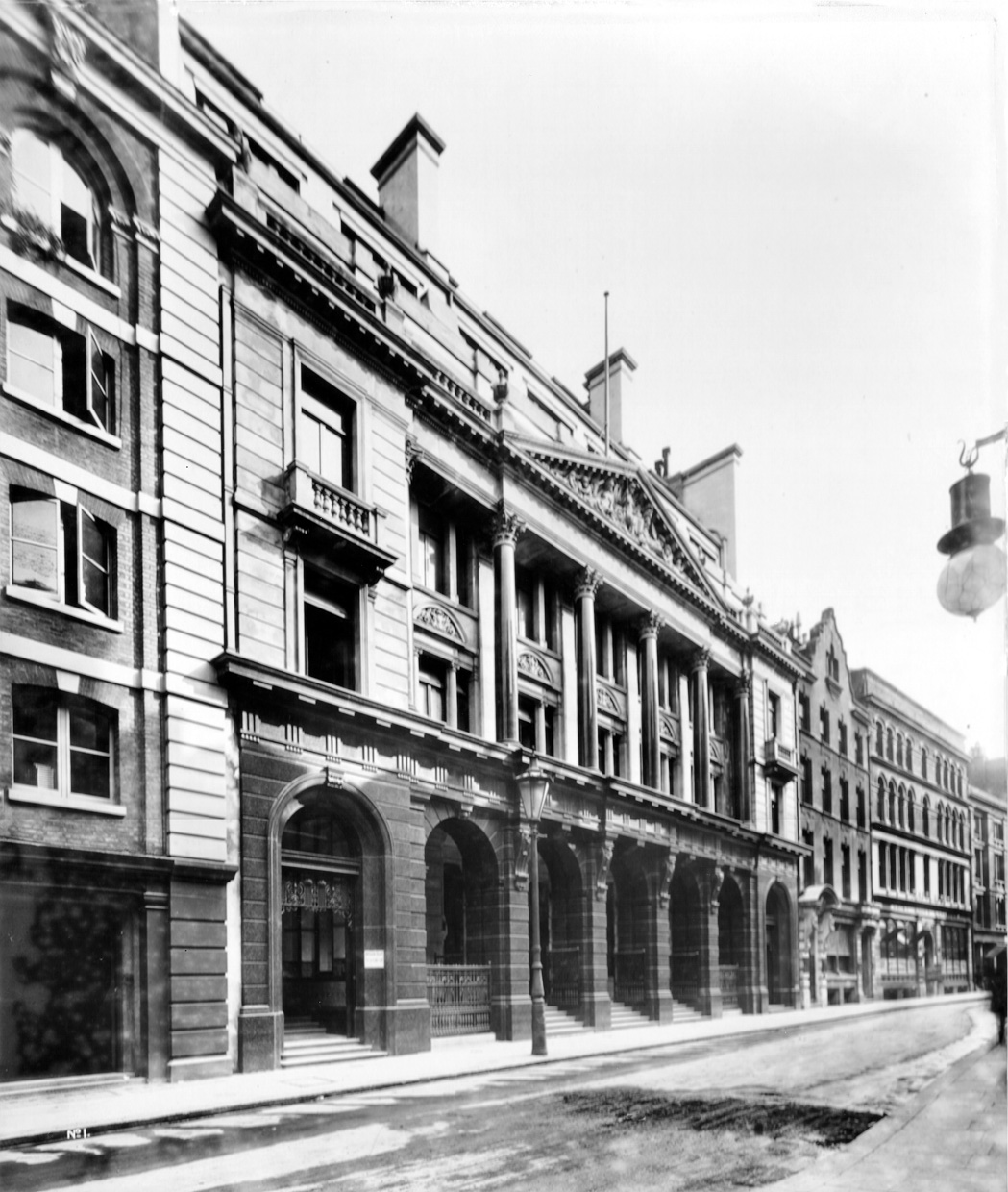
Baltic Exchange, 1903

William James Wimble FRIBA (1848–1903) was an English architect based in London.

== Life ==
He was born on 22 March 1848 in Maidstone, Kent the son of Edward Wimble (1804–1875) and Mary Margaret Wildish (1810–1889). He died on 12 January 1903 at 74 Jermyn Street aged 54 and left an estate of £8,023 (equivalent to £843,400 in 2025).

== Career ==
He commenced independent practice in 1873 based at 2 Walbrook, London, and shortly thereafter joined into a partnership with his brother John Wimble (1837–1877). His brother John died in 1877 and William continued the business alone.

His practice was at 9 Queen Victoria Street, London.

In 1887 he was appointed architect and surveyor to the Worshipful Company of Vintners and in 188 he was made a Fellow of the Royal Institute of British Architects.

== Architectural Works ==
- 106 Cheapside, London 1879
- Warehouse for G.R. Herron and Son, St Thomas's Street, Borough, London 1880–81
- Palsgrave Hotel (then Lloyds Bank from 1894 to 2017), Royal Courts of Justice, Strand, London 1882–83 (with Goymour Cuthbert) Grade II listed
- New Building, Coventry Street, Haymarket, London 1884 Grade II listed
- London Salvage Corps offices, 90–92 Upper Street, Islington, London 1884–85 Grade II listed
- Business Premises, Queen Victoria Street/Upper Thames Street, London 1885. (demolished)
- Bunch of Grapes public house, 14 Lime Street, London 1893
- Baltic Exchange, 24–28 St Mary Axe, London 1902 with T.H. Smith (damaged by the Provisional IRA on 10 April 1992 and subsequently demolished)
- 23 Haymarket, London (right hand side)

== Sources ==
- Bradley, Simon; Pevsner, Nikolaus (1997). London 1: The City of London. The Buildings of England. New Haven and London: Yale University Press. ISBN 0-14-071092-2.
- Cherry, Bridget; Pevsner, Nikolaus (2002). London 3: North West. The Buildings of England. New Haven and London: Yale University Press. ISBN 0-300-09652-6.
- Bradley, Simon; Pevsner, Nikolaus (2003). London 6: Westminster. The Buildings of England. Yale University Press. ISBN 978-0-300-09595-1.
