= The Gherkin =

Skyscraper in London, England

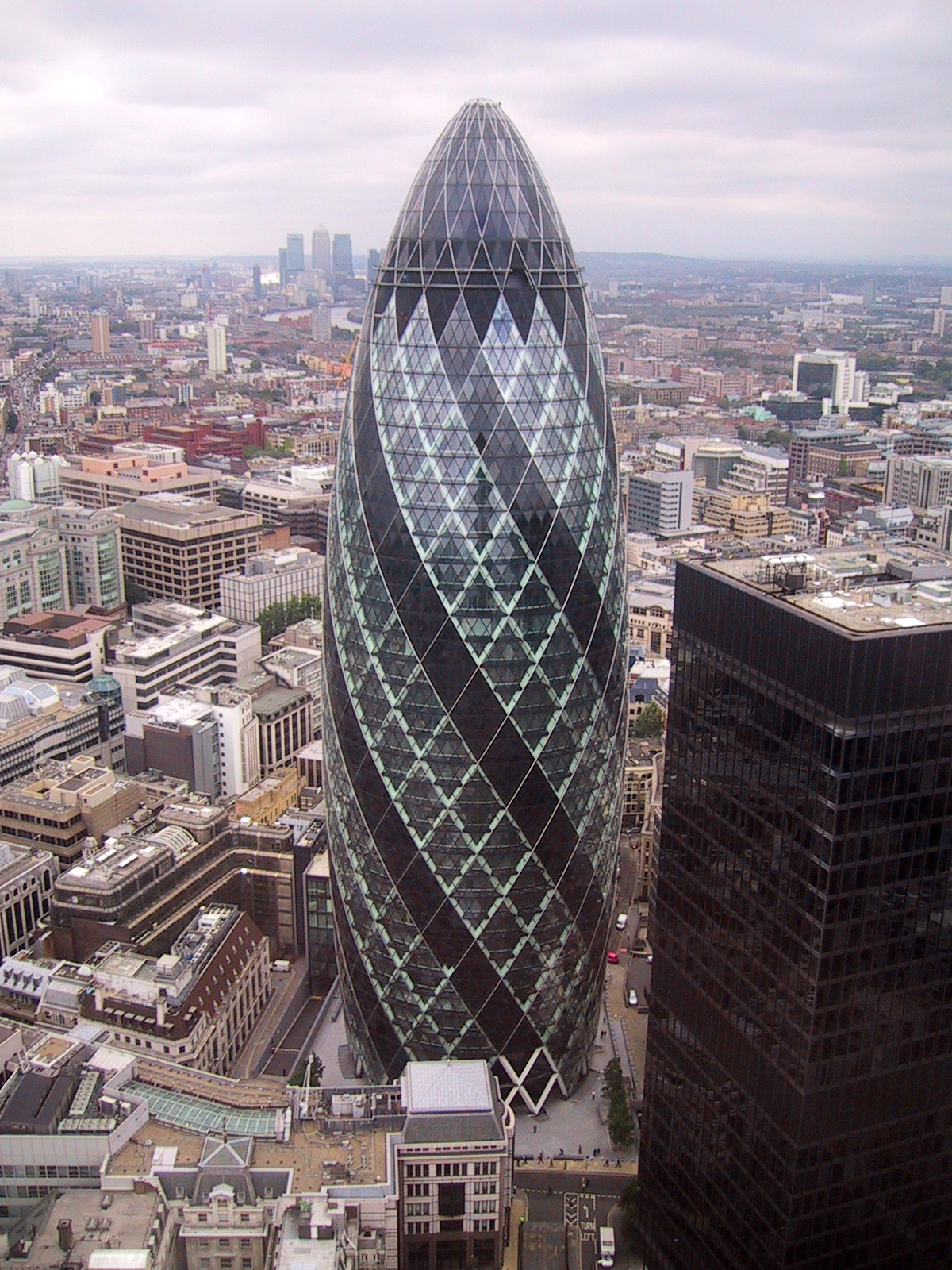
- The Gherkin in 2007
- Alternative names: 30 St Mary Axe / the Swiss Re Building

General information
- Status: Completed
- Type: Office
- Architectural style: Neo-futuristic / hi-tech / post-modern
- Location: 30 St Mary Axe, London, EC3
- Coordinates: 51°30′52″N 00°04′49″W
- Construction started: 2001
- Completed: 2003
- Opened: 28 April 2004
- Cost: £138 million (plus land cost of £90.6 million) adjusted for inflation: £259 million (plus land cost of £176 million)
- Owner: Safra Group

Height
- Roof: 180 metres (591 ft)

Technical details
- Floor count: 41
- Floor area: 64,470 square metres (693,900 sq ft)

Design and construction
- Architect: Foster + Partners
- Structural engineer: Arup
- Main contractor: Skanska

Website
- thegherkin.com

30 St Mary Axe, previously known as the Swiss Re Building, is a commercial skyscraper in London's primary financial district, the City of London. It is nicknamed The Gherkin after the vegetable of the same name due to its shape. It was completed in December 2003 and opened in April 2004. With 41 floors, it is 180 metres (591 ft) tall and stands on the sites of the former Baltic Exchange and Chamber of Shipping, which were extensively damaged in 1992 in the Baltic Exchange bombing by a device placed by the Provisional IRA in St Mary Axe, a narrow street leading north from Leadenhall Street.

After plans to build the 92-storey Millennium Tower were dropped, 30 St Mary Axe was designed by Foster + Partners and the Arup Group. It was built by Skanska; construction started in 2001. The building has become a recognisable landmark of London, and it is one of the city's most widely recognised examples of contemporary architecture. It won the 2003 Emporis Skyscraper Award.

== Site and early plans ==
The building stands on the site of the former Baltic Exchange (24–28 St Mary Axe), which was the headquarters of a global marketplace for shipping freight contracts and soft commodities, and the Chamber of Shipping (30–32 St Mary Axe). The tower's topmost panoramic dome, known as the "Lens", recalls the iconic glass dome that covered part of the ground floor of the Baltic Exchange and much of which is now displayed at the National Maritime Museum. The Gherkin nickname was applied to the current building at least as early as 1999, referring to the plan's highly unorthodox layout and appearance.

On 10 April 1992, the Provisional IRA detonated a bomb close to the Baltic Exchange, causing extensive damage to the historic building and neighbouring structures. The United Kingdom government's statutory adviser on the historic environment, English Heritage, and the City of London's governing body, the City of London Corporation, were keen that any redevelopment must restore the Baltic Exchange's old façade onto St Mary Axe. The Exchange Hall was a celebrated fixture of the shipping market.

English Heritage then discovered that the damage was far more severe than initially thought, and they stopped insisting on full restoration, albeit over the objections of architectural conservationists. The Baltic Exchange and the Chamber of Shipping sold the land to Trafalgar House in 1995. Most of the remaining structures on the Baltic Exchange site were then carefully dismantled, and the interior of Exchange Hall and the façade were preserved, hoping for a reconstruction of the building in the future. The salvaged material was sold for £800,000 and moved to Tallinn, Estonia, where it awaits reconstruction as the centrepiece of the city's commercial sector.

In 1996, Trafalgar House submitted plans for the London Millennium Tower, a 386-metre (1,266 ft) building with more than 140,000 m^{2} (1,500,000 sq ft) of office space, apartments, shops, restaurants and gardens. This plan was dropped after objections that it was totally out-of-scale in the City of London, and anticipated disruption to flight paths for both London City and London Heathrow airports; the revised plan for a lower tower was accepted.

=== Planning process ===
John Prescott, the Deputy Prime Minister, granted planning permission on 23 August 2000 to construct a building on the site, which would be much larger than the old Exchange. The site needed development, was not on any of the "sight lines" (planning guidance requires that new buildings do not obstruct or detract from the view of St Paul's Cathedral dome when viewed from a number of locations around London), and had housed the Baltic Exchange.

The plan for the site was to reconstruct the Baltic Exchange. GMW Architects proposed a new rectangular building surrounding a restored exchange: it would have the type of large floor plan that banks liked. Eventually, the planners realised that the exchange was not recoverable, forcing them to relax their building constraints; they hinted that an "architecturally significant" building might obtain a favourable reception from City authorities. This enabled alternative designs to be considered. The building was redesigned according to the client's needs, rather than for the needs of a large, capital-efficient, money-making building.

The new building's low-level plan satisfied the planning authority's desire to maintain London's traditional streetscape, with its narrow streets. The massing of the tower was not too imposing. Like Barclays' former city headquarters in Lombard Street, the idea was that the passer-by in neighbouring streets would be nearly oblivious to the tower's existence until directly underneath it.

Foster and Partners was awarded the tender for its design for the building in 1999. The project was managed by RWG Associates, structural engineering was provided by Arup, and Skanska served as the main contractor.

== Design and construction ==
The design by Foster + Assocs has been described as incorporating various architectural styles: high-tech architecture (also known as structural expressionism), neo-futurism, and post-modernism.

The building was constructed by Skanska, completed in December 2003 and opened on 28 April 2004. The main tenant of the building is Swiss Re, who had the building commissioned as the head office for its UK operation. The tower is thus sometimes known as the Swiss Re Building, although this name has never been official and was never in popular usage anyway, unlike the Gherkin moniker.

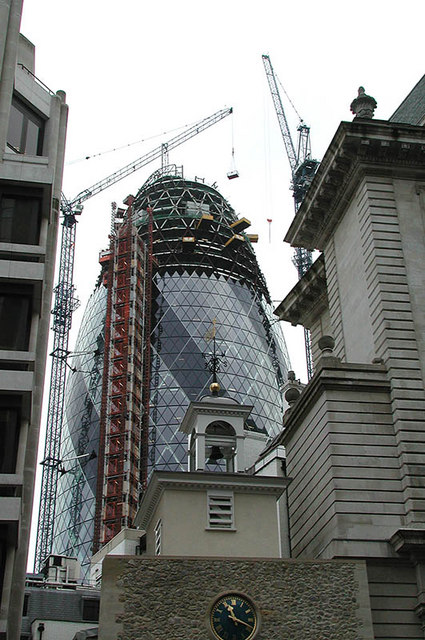
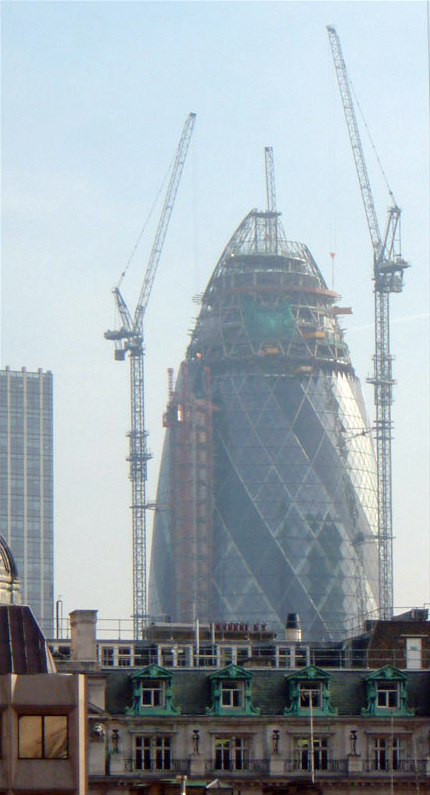
The Gherkin under construction

The building uses energy-saving methods which allow it to use only half the power that a similar tower would typically consume. Gaps in each floor create six shafts that serve as a natural ventilation system for the entire building, even though required firebreaks on every sixth floor interrupt the "chimney". The shafts create a giant double glazing effect; air is sandwiched between two layers of glazing and insulates the office space inside.

Architects promote double glazing in residential houses, which avoids the inefficient convection of heat across the relatively narrow gap between the panes, but the tower exploits this effect. The shafts pull warm air out of the building during the summer and warm the building in the winter using passive solar heating. The shafts also allow sunlight to pass through the building, making the work environment more pleasing, and keeping the lighting costs down.

The primary methods for controlling wind-excited sways are to increase the stiffness, or increase damping with tuned/active mass dampers. To a design by Arup, its fully triangulated perimeter structure makes the building rigid enough without any extra reinforcements. Despite its overall curved glass shape, there is only one piece of curved glass on the building, the lens-shaped cap at the apex.

On the building's top level (the 40th floor), there is a bar for tenants and their guests, with a panoramic view of London. A restaurant operates on the 39th floor, and private dining rooms on the 38th. Most buildings have extensive lift equipment on the roof of the building, but this was not possible for the Gherkin, since a bar had been planned for the 40th floor. The architects dealt with this by having the main lift only reach the 34th floor, with a separate push-from-below lift to the 39th floor. There is a marble stairwell and a disabled persons' lift, which leads the visitor up to the bar in the dome.

The building is visible over long distances: From the north, for instance, it can be seen from the M11 motorway, some 32 kilometres (20 mi) away, while to the west it can be seen from the statue of George III in Windsor Great Park.

== After completion ==
In April 2005, a glass panel two thirds up the tower fell to the plaza beneath. The plaza was sealed off, but the building remained open. A temporary covered walkway, extending across the plaza to the building's reception, was erected to protect visitors. Engineers examined the other 744 glass panels on the building. The cost of repair was covered by main contractor Skanska and curtain-wall supplier Schmidlin (now called Schmidlin-TSK AG). The open-floor ventilation system did not operate as designed due to tenants adding glass partitions to increase security.

Since its completion, the building has won a number of awards for architecture. In October 2004, the architect was awarded the 2004 Stirling Prize. For the first time in the prize's history, the judges were unanimous. In December 2005, a survey of the world's largest firms of architects published in 2006 BD World Architecture 200 voted the tower as the most admired new building in the world. However, Ken Shuttleworth, who worked for Foster + Partners on the design of the building, said in 2011 that he believed the style was now out-moded: "I was looking at the glass all around and [thought], 'Why on earth did we do that?' Now, we would do things differently." The building appeared in the CBeebies children's show Me Too! under the name Harlequin Hospital and in films such as Harry Potter and the Half Blood Prince, A Good Year, Basic Instinct 2, and Match Point and, rechristened the Spirit of London, became the spaceship centrepiece of Keith Mansfield's 2008 novel Johnny Mackintosh and the Spirit of London.

In September 2006, the building was put up for sale with a price tag of £600 million. Potential buyers included British Land, Land Securities, Prudential, ING, and the Abu Dhabi royal family. On 21 February 2007, IVG Immobilien AG and UK investment firm Evans Randall completed their joint purchase of the building for £630 million, making it Britain's most expensive office building. Swiss Re made a gain of more than £300 million from the sale. The new owners are seeking compensation from four of their former managers on the deal, in which about £620 million was paid for a building with a build cost of about £200 million, giving the previous owners a clear £300 million profit.

Since February 2010, Sky News has broadcast its flagship business programme, Jeff Randall Live, from a studio in the building. The top two floors of the tower have been available since at least 2015 for private hire for events.

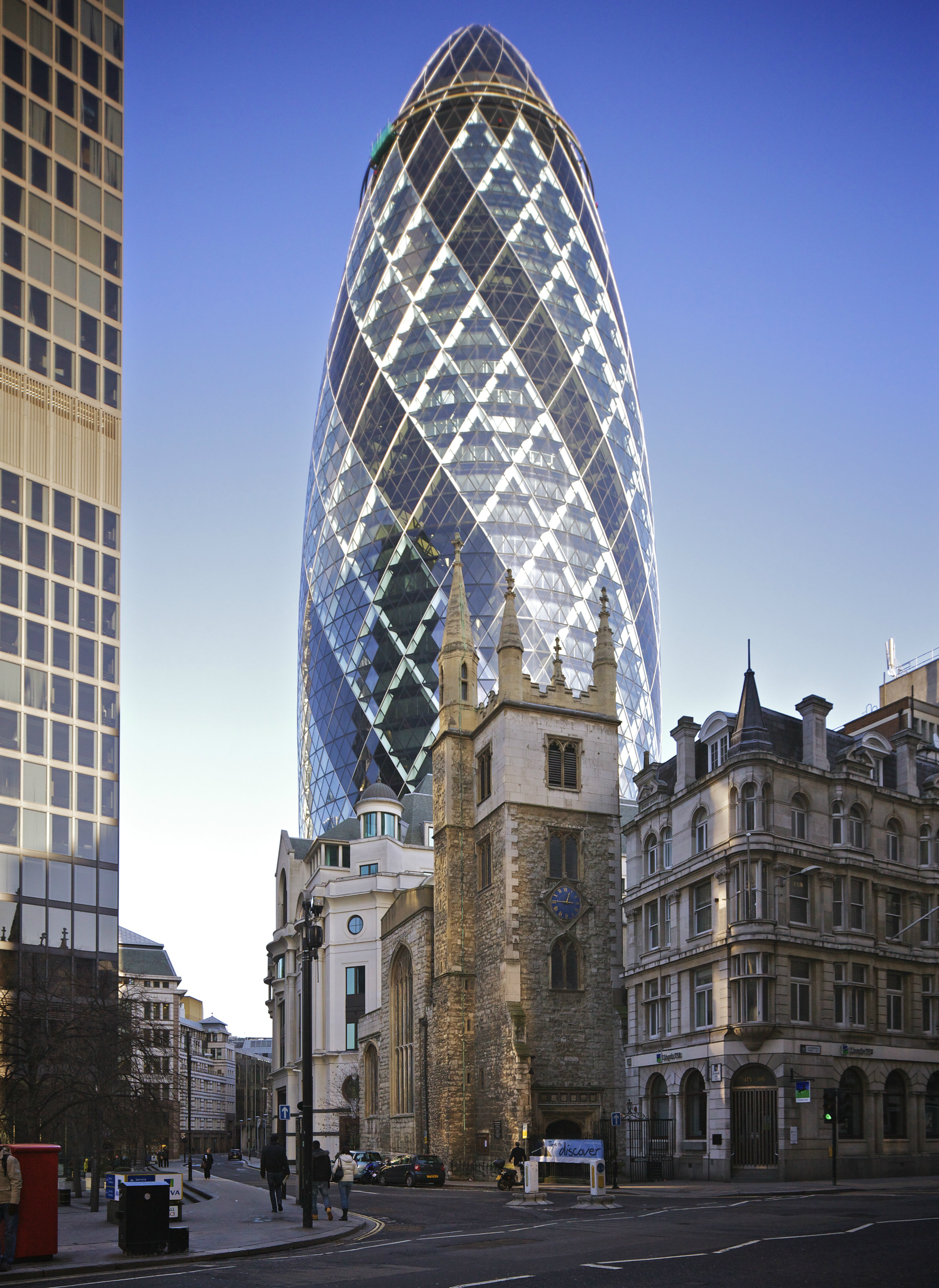
The Gherkin seen from Leadenhall Street in contrast with the juxtaposition of the 16th century St Andrew Undershaft church in 2010

Deloitte announced in April 2014 that the building was again being put up for sale, with an expected price of £550 million. The current owners could not afford to make loan repayments, citing differences in the value of the multi-currency loan and the British pound, high interest rates and general financing structure. In November 2014, the Gherkin was purchased for £700 million by the Safra Group, controlled by the Lebanese - Brazilian billionaire Joseph Safra.

=== Roman tomb ===
In the construction process of 30 St Mary Axe, a skeleton of a teenage girl was unearthed and dated as roughly 1600 years old. To prevent damaging it throughout the construction process, it was stored in the Museum of London. In 2006, three years after the completion of the building, she was returned to and reburied on the site. Her tomb is visible and marked with an inscription in both Latin and English:

| To the spirits of the dead | DIS MANIBVS |
| the unknown young girl | PVELLA INCOGNITA |
| from Roman London | LONDINIENSIS |
| lies buried here | HIC SEPVLTA EST |

== See also ==
- Landmarks of London
- Diagrid
- List of tallest buildings and structures in London
- Mathematics and architecture
- Phallic architecture, a list of similarly shaped buildings that includes 30 St Mary Axe
