= Royal College of Organists =

United Kingdom non-profit, founded 1864

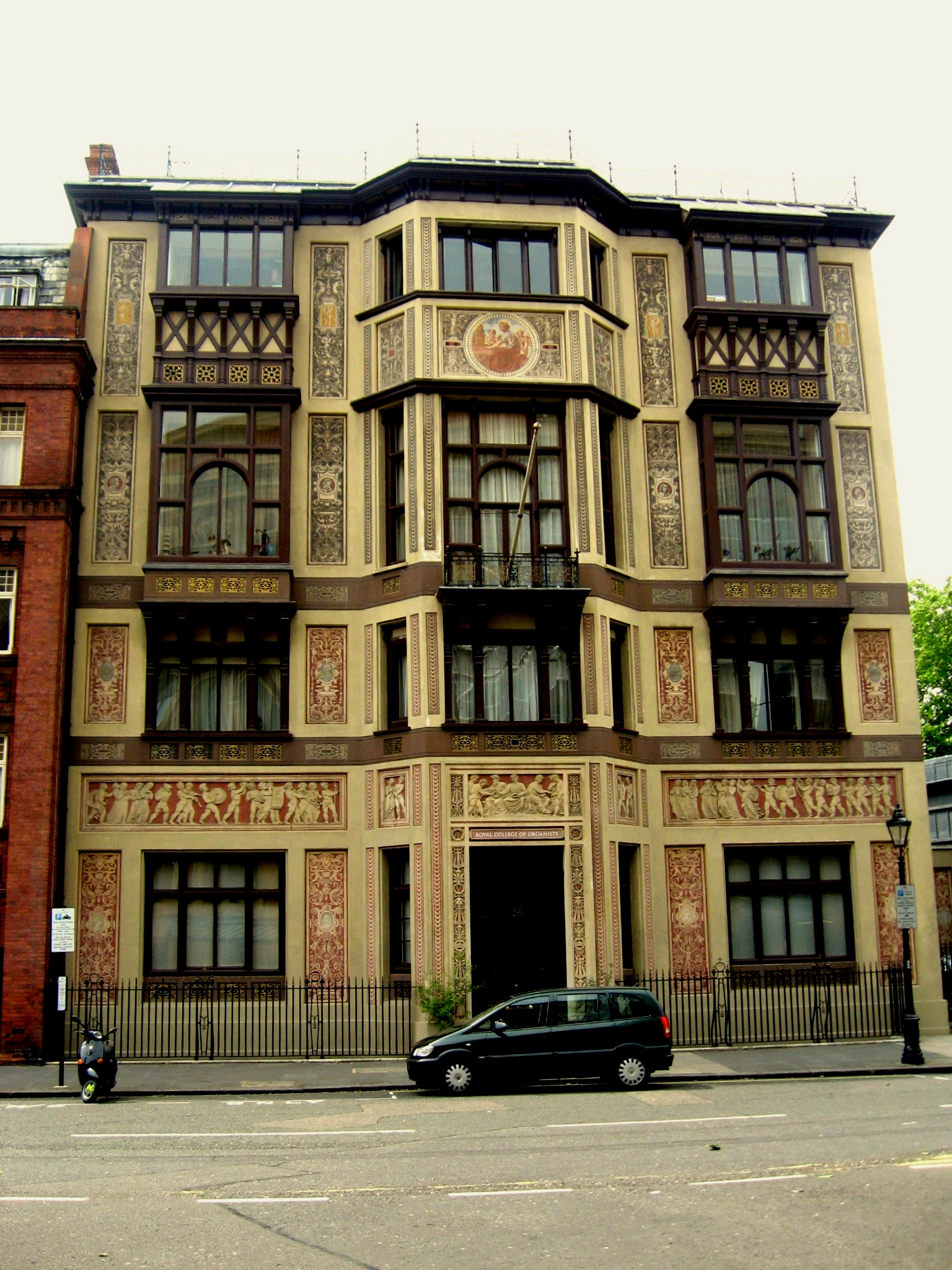
- The building in Kensington, London, which housed the Royal College of Organists from 1903 to 1991
- Formation: 1864
- Founder: Richard Limpus
- Type: Charity incorporated by Royal Charter
- Headquarters: 1 Speed Highwalk, Barbican, London EC2Y 8DX
- Members: 2008 (2020)
- Chief Executive: Sir Andrew Parmley
- Website: rco.org.uk
- Formerly called: College of Organists

The Royal College of Organists (RCO) is a charity and membership organisation based in the United Kingdom, with members worldwide. Its role is to promote and advance organ playing and choral music, and it offers music education, training and development, and professional support for organists and choral directors.

The college also provides accreditation in organ playing, choral directing and organ teaching; it runs an extensive education and outreach programme across the UK; and it maintains an internationally important library containing more than 60,000 titles concerning the organ, organ and choral music and organ playing.

== History ==
The RCO was founded as the College of Organists in 1864 by Richard Limpus, the organist of St Michael, Cornhill, in the City of London, and received its Royal Charter in 1893. In 1903 it was offered a 99-year lease at peppercorn rent on a building designed by the architect H. H. Cole in Kensington Gore, west London. When it became clear in the mid-1980s that an economic rent would be charged on expiry of that lease, the lease was sold and the college moved into new accommodation in 1991. The building subsequently become the home of property tycoon Robert Tchenguiz.

In 2003 plans were announced for more permanent purpose-built premises around the Grade I listed former Curzon Street railway station in Birmingham, a notable piece of monumental railway architecture. New facilities designed by Associated Architects included a new library and 270-seat concert hall. However, in 2005 the RCO announced that this move would not be taking place and subsequently that it would no longer be looking for a permanent home of this kind, focussing instead on activities such as education, events, examinations and member services.

In 2014 the college celebrated its 150th anniversary with a year-long programme of events including recitals, conferences, music festivals, courses and publications. In 2020 the RCO announced that Saturday 18 April would be its inaugural National Organ Day. In 2024 King Charles III accepted the patronage of the RCO, succeeding his mother, Queen Elizabeth II, after her death in 2022.

== First members ==
The first members of the College of Organists (MCO) were:

- G. B. Arnold, New College, Oxford
- W. H. Adams, St Martin-in-the-Fields
- T. G. Baines, organist at St Margaret's, Westminster
- J. Blockley, St Mark's Regents Park
- A. S. Cooper
- W. B. Gilbert, Mus. B. Oxon, All Saints Church, Maidstone
- A. W. Hammond, Hon. Treasurer and proprietor and editor of the Musical Standard
- Edward Herbert, Mus. B., Oxon, Sherborne Abbey
- James Higgs
- Edward John Hopkins
- Charles Kelly, All Souls Church, Langham Place
- F. Kingsbury
- Richard Limpus, Honorary secretary
- William Henry Longhurst
- E. M. Lott, St Peter's, Notting Hill
- Dr Marshall, St John's Church, Kidderminster
- Edwin George Monk
- Ebenezer Prout
- W. Spark, Leeds Town Hall
- Charles Steggall
- Charles Edward Stephens
- Joseph Surman, Exeter Hall
- W. J. Westbrook, St Bartholomew's, Sydenham

Edmund Hart Turpin, was made a fellow of the Royal College of Organists without examination in 1869, and became a member shortly afterwards. From 1875 he succeeded Richard Limpus as honorary secretary of the Royal College of Organists.

== Learning and outreach ==
The college runs the RCO Academy programme to provide education and support to organists and students.

== Exams ==
The college offers a programme of accreditation for organ and choral directing. The Certificate of Accredited Membership (CAM) is a three-staged framework designed to build and strengthen fundamental organ playing skills and musicianship. The Diploma of Colleague (CRCO) provides a foundation for developing organists. The Associateship Diploma (ARCO) demonstrates high achievement in organ playing and supporting theoretical work. The Fellowship diploma (FRCO) offers a progression for those who already hold the ARCO and represents a premier standard in organ playing. In 2026 the College introduced new diplomas for choral directing - the Colleague Diploma CChd(RCO), Associate Diploma AChD(RCO) and Fellow Diploma FChD(RCO).

== Library ==
The college's library, with more than 60,000 specialist holdings of organ and choral music and books, is housed at Royal Birmingham Conservatoire's Curzon Library and the Royal College of Music, London.

== Organ ==
The organ by J. W. Walker & Sons Ltd that was built for the old College in Kensington was installed in the Church of Christ the Cornerstone in Milton Keynes in 1991.

== See also ==
- Anne Marsden Thomas
- American Guild of Organists
- British Institute of Organ Studies
