= Baltic Exchange Memorial Glass =

Stained glass war memorial windows

Coordinates: 51.4808°N 0.0048°W

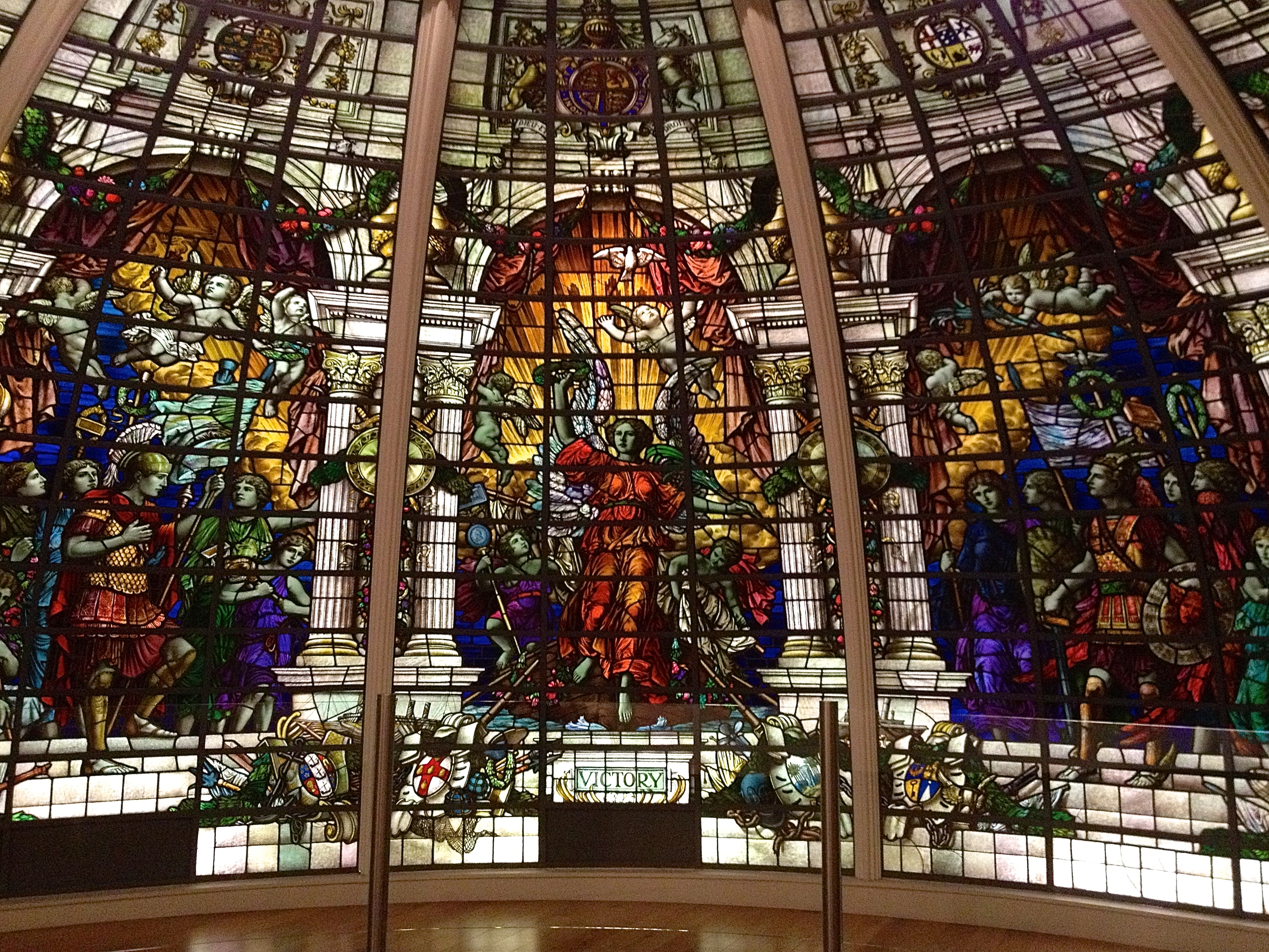
Part of the Baltic Exchange Memorial Glass, now displayed at the National Maritime Museum

The Baltic Exchange Memorial Glass comprises several stained glass windows designed by English artist John Dudley Forsyth which were installed over a staircase at the Baltic Exchange in London in 1922, as a memorial to the members and staff of the exchange who were killed while serving during the First World War. The memorial glass was damaged in an IRA bombing in 1992. With funding from Swiss Re, the memorial glass was restored by glass conservators Goddard & Gibbs, and has been displayed at the National Maritime Museum in Greenwich since 2005.

== Description ==
The memorial forms a hemispherical half-dome about 3 metres (9.8 ft) high, with 240 panels forming five rectangular windows of painted coloured glass, each of which features a personification of the virtues Truth, Hope, Justice, Fortitude and Faith. The dome is replete with classical and religious symbolism, featuring a winged figure of Victory stepping from a boat into a classical temple, accompanied by Roman soldiers, putti, a dove symbolising peace, the royal coat of arms of the United Kingdom, and armorial shields and badges for the territories of the British Empire. Two panels, one to either side, list battles in the First World War – Cambrai, Mezières, Arras and Lens, Galipoli, and Messines Ridge to the left; and Bethune, Salonika, Ypres and Loos, Givenchy, Paschendaele to the right.

The glass was put together by Lowndes & Drury at The Glass House, Fulham. It was unveiled by General Sir Herbert Alexander Lawrence on 1 June 1922, and dedicated by the Bishop of Willesden William Perrin. It replaced the clear glazed windows and dome included on the north side of the exchange when it was rebuilt in 1903. Originally, it was accompanied by marble panels listing the 61 members of the Baltic Exchange who died in the First World War. The panels predate the glass, and were unveiled 16 July 1920.

== Preservation ==
The glass survived the Second World War intact, but suffered damage in an IRA bombing on 10 April 1992. Only 45 of the 240 panels of the dome were left intact, while the other panels, and all five of the windows, suffered damage. Plans to rebuild the Baltic Exchange were abandoned when the extent of the damage became clear. The remnants of the old building were demolished in 1998, and replaced by 30 St Mary Axe (nicknamed the Gherkin) where the glazed rooftop dome refers back to the dome of the Baltic Exchange. The marble panels were installed at the Baltic Exchange's new building at 38 St Mary Axe.
