= John Wimble =

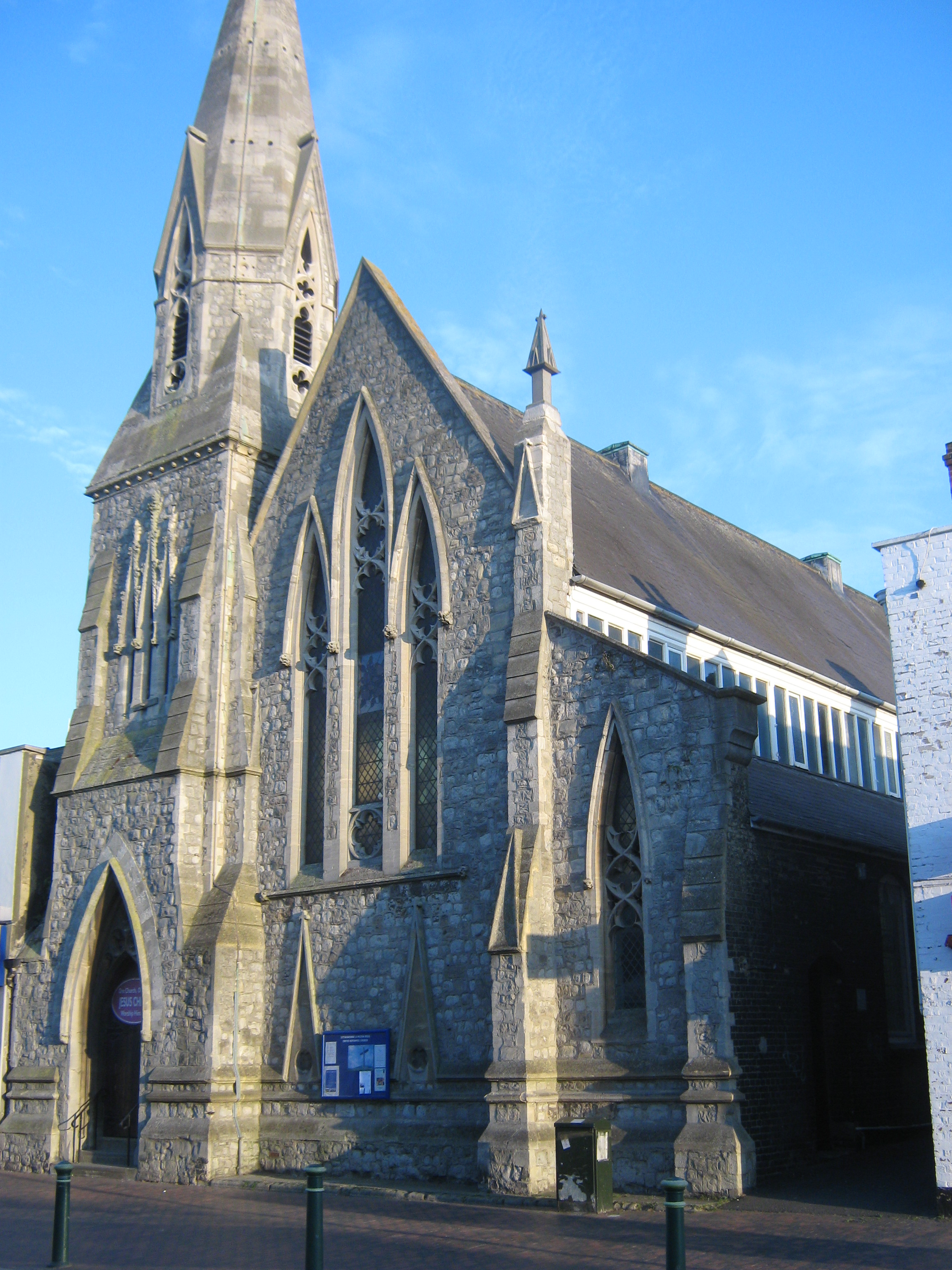
Former Congregational church, Sittingbourne, Kent 1862-63

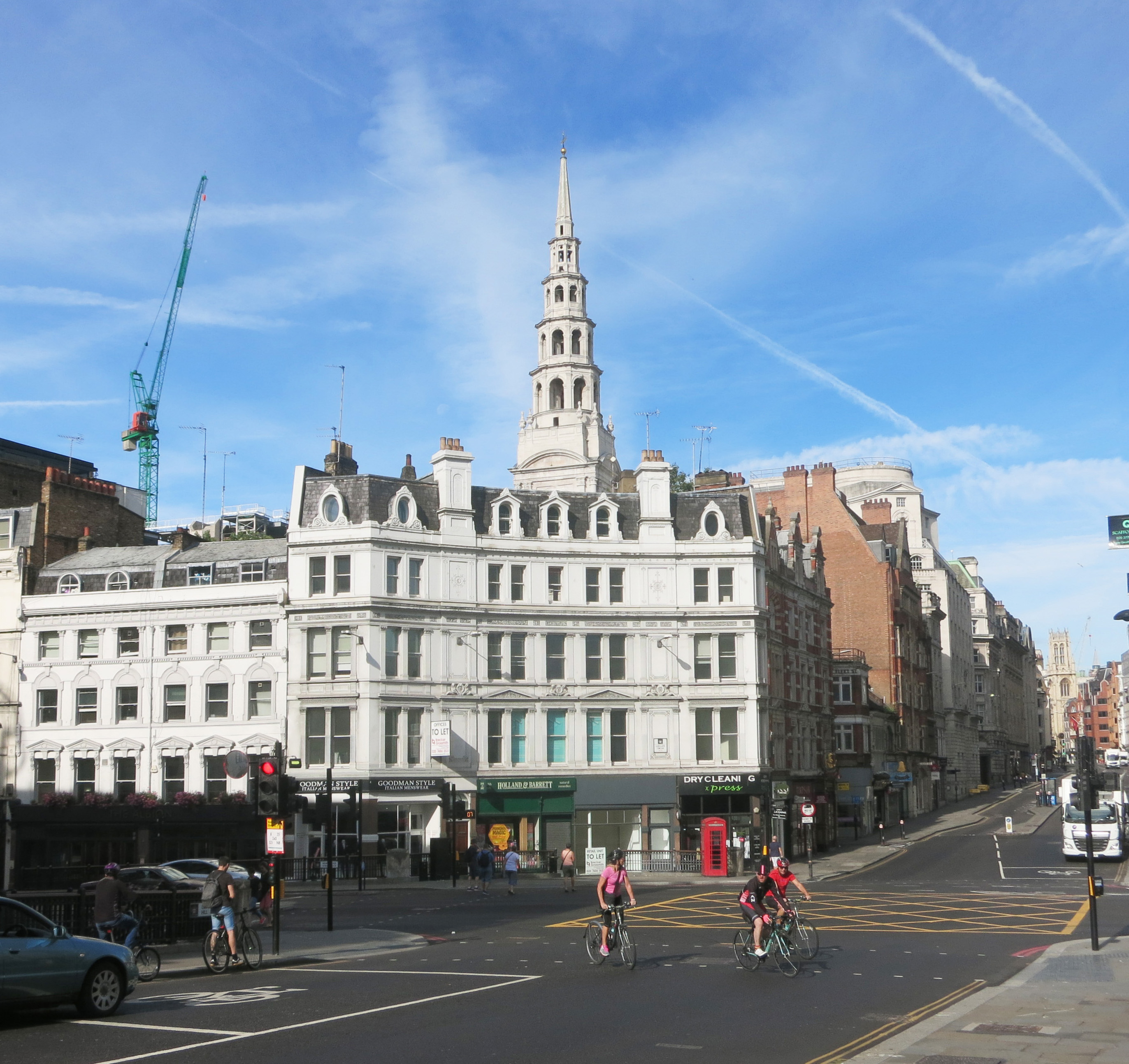
South west quadrant of Ludgate Circus

John Wimble (1837-1877) was an English architect based in London.

== Life ==
He was born in 1837 in Maidstone, Kent the son of Edward Wimble (1804-1875) and Mary Margaret Wildish (1810-1889). He died on 29 June 1877 and was buried in St Mary's Church, Long Ditton on 4 July 1877.

== Career ==
He was educated at Tonbridge School and then articled to John Whichcord Sr. & Son in Maidstone, Kent. He set himself up in independent practice and after a few years entered into a partnership with his younger brother William Wimble. He died in 1877 and William continued the business alone.

== Architectural Works ==
- Sittingbourne Cemetery 1860
- Congregational Church, High Street, Sittingbourne 1862-63 (now Covenant Love Church)
- Albert wing, Royal Asylum of St Anne’s Society, Streatham. 1865 (Demolished 1987)
- Warehouse, Southwark Street, London 1867
- Warehouse, 222 Upper Thames Street, London (now demolished)
- Peter Lawson and Son, 20 Budge Row, London 1867 (demolished)
- Countess of Huntingdon’s chapel, Tunbridge Wells 1867 (demolished 1974)
- 32 Watling Street, London 1867
- Store front, Wimble and Nutt, 34 Week Street, Maidstone, Kent 1869 (building demolished)
- Countess of Huntingdon’s Connexion Church, North Street, Brighton 1870-71 (demolished 1972)
- Peninsular and Oriental Steam Company Offices, 25 Cockspur Street, London 1873
- London Salvage Corps station, Watling Street, London (demolished)
- London Salvage Corps station, 38–40 Commercial Road, London 1874 (demolished 1937)
- Bedford Hotel, Henrietta Street/Southampton Street, Covent Garden, London 1876-77 (from the designs of Henry Clutton)
- 24 Haymarket, London 1877 (with William Wimble)
- Investment Company, 41 Cheapside, London 1877 (with William Wimble)
- Dyer’s buildings, Holborn, London 1871-78
- Offices, Gresham Street/Coleman Street, London (demolished)
- Boosey’s premises, Regent Street, London
- Domestic property, Ryder Street, St James’, London
- 59, 60 and 61 Haymarket, London
- Warehouses, Fenchurch/Leadenhall Street, London
- Mildmay Chambers, Bishopsgate Street, London
- Messrs Mather, 75 Farringdon Road, London (demolished)
- South West Quadrant, Ludgate Circus, London

== Sources ==
- Bradley, Simon; Pevsner, Nikolaus (1997). London 1: The City of London. The Buildings of England. New Haven and London: Yale University Press. ISBN 0-14-071092-2.
