= List of nicknames for London skyscrapers =

Londoners have a habit of nicknaming new buildings based upon their shape. In 2003, the then Prince Charles said "it looks as though London seems to be turning into an absurdist picnic table—we already have a giant gherkin, now it looks as if we are going to have an enormous salt cellar."

== Nicknames for London buildings ==
=== The Gherkin ===
Officially 30 St Mary Axe and previously known as the Swiss Re Building, The Gherkin is a commercial skyscraper in London's primary financial district, the City of London. The Gherkin nickname was applied to the current building at least as early as 1999, referring to the plan's layout and appearance.

=== The Walkie-Talkie ===
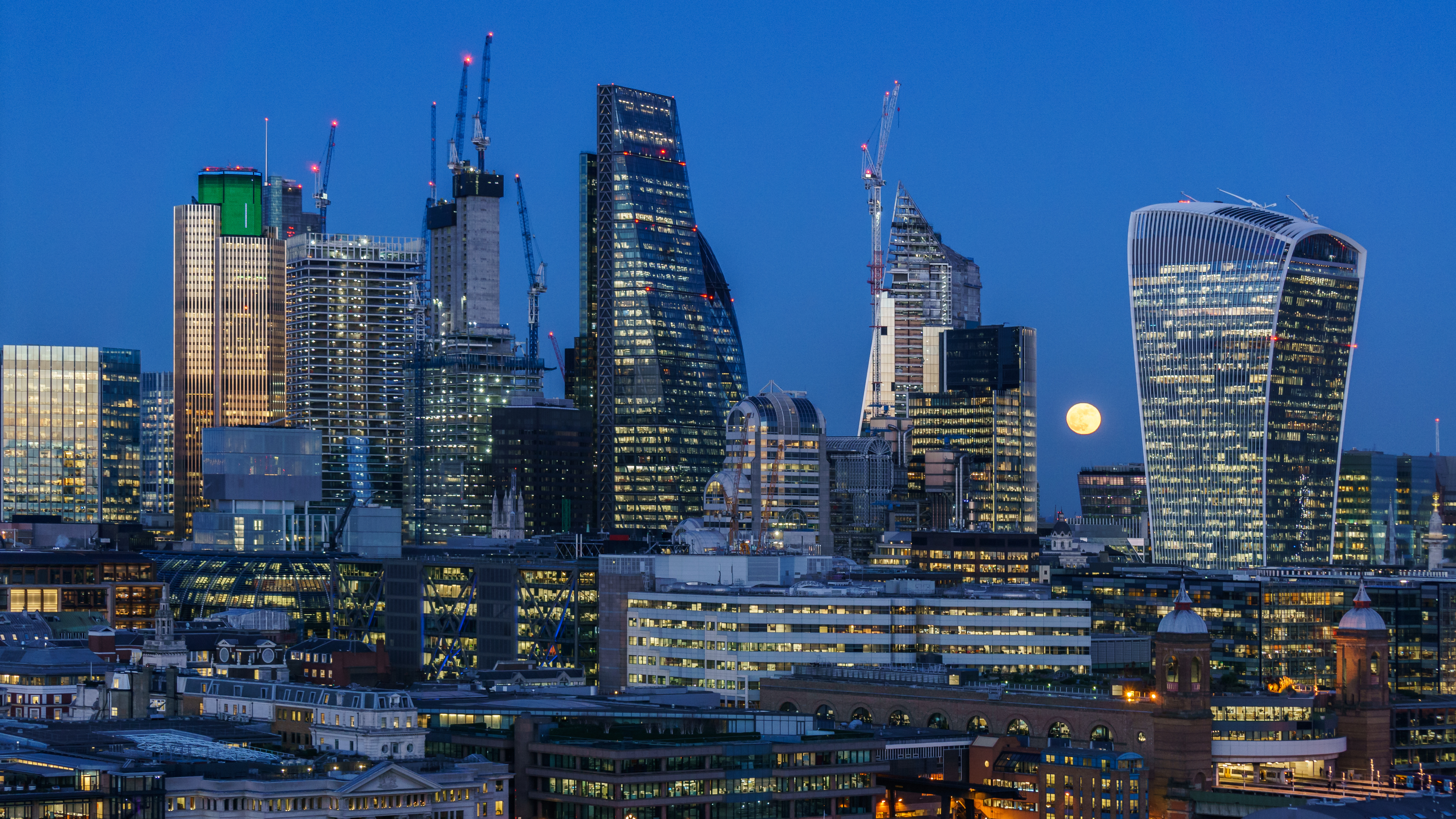
The Walkie-Talkie (right)

20 Fenchurch Street is a commercial skyscraper. It has been nicknamed The Walkie-Talkie because of its distinctive shape, said to resemble a walkie-talkie handset.

=== The Scalpel ===
Located at 52 Lime Street, The Scalpel was originally a nickname but subsequently designated as its official name. It was coined by the Financial Times due to the building's distinctive angular design. It has also been noted for its similarity to a "play" media button due to how it looks from south of the River Thames.

=== The Shard ===
Referred to as both The Shard and the Shard London Bridge and formerly London Bridge Tower, it is a tapered 72-storey mixed-use development, designed by the Italian architect Renzo Piano, in Southwark, London, which forms part of The Shard Quarter development. The design provoked criticism from English Heritage, who claimed the building would be "a shard of glass through the heart of historic London", giving the building its name.

=== Pringle ===
Built for the 2012 London Olympics, the Olympic Velodrome's unique roof has earned it the nickname of Pringle after the popular crisp brand.

=== The Cheesegrater ===
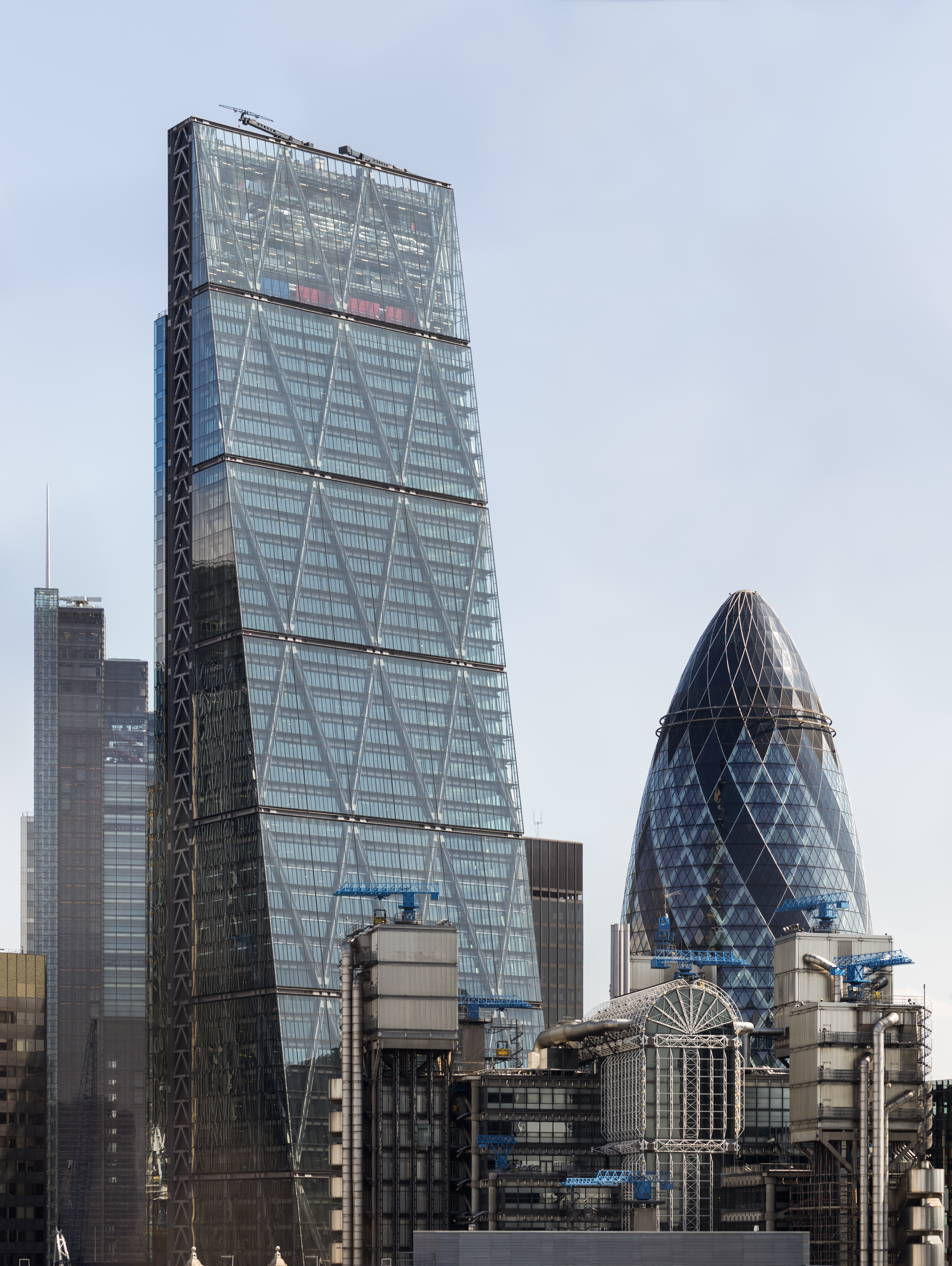
122 Leadenhall Street (left) and The Gherkin (right)

122 Leadenhall Street is a 225-metre-tall (738 ft) skyscraper in central London. It opened in July 2014 and was designed by Rogers Stirk Harbour + Partners; it is known informally as The Cheesegrater because of its distinctive wedge shape, similar to that of the kitchen utensil of the same name.

=== The Jenga ===
8 Bishopsgate is a 51-storey, 204-metre (669 ft) tall commercial skyscraper located in the City of London. When it opened in 2023, it was the 11th-tallest building in London. It was nicknamed The Jenga due to the three block-like sections which appear to be balanced on top of each other, similar to the game of Jenga.

=== The Can of Ham ===
70 St Mary Axe is informally known as the Can of Ham or Can of Spam due to its shape.

=== The Helter Skelter/The Wodge ===
Located at 22 Bishopsgate, the original design's twisting roof and the curling patterns in the façade were based on various organic forms in nature such as armadillos, mushrooms and seashells, and led to the design being nicknamed "The Helter Skelter". The eventual redesign which became the now-constructed 22 Bishopsgate was nicknamed "The Wodge" by The Guardian, with wodge being British slang for a large piece or amount of something.

=== The Boomerang or the Vase ===
One Blackfriars is a mixed-use development at No. 1 Blackfriars Road in Bankside, London. It is informally known as The Boomerang or The Vase due to its shape. According to the architect Ian Simpson, the unusual shape of the building was inspired by Timo Sarpaneva's classic Lansetti glass vase from 1952.

=== Glass Testicle, the Glass Onion, or Armadillo ===
The old City Hall is a building in Southwark, London, which previously served as the headquarters of the Greater London Authority (GLA). Former mayor Ken Livingstone called it the "glass testicle", and another former mayor, Boris Johnson, called it the "glass gonad".

It is more commonly known as the Glass Onion or Armadillo due to its shape.

== Proposed buildings that earned nicknames ==
Some buildings were nicknamed while they were still architectural concepts, and were never actually built.

=== Tulip Tower ===
Plans for the 1,000 feet (300 m) tall tower shaped like a Tulip were rejected in 2021, but not before the building got its nickname as the "Erotic Gherkin".

== See also ==
- City of London landmarks
- List of tallest buildings and structures in London
