= Anne Marsden Thomas =

English organist and pedagogue

- Born: 23 September 1948 (age 78); London
- Occupations: Organ teacher, organist and author
- Awards: MBE, 2015 New Years Honours List RCO Medal (Royal College of Organists), 2017

Anne Marsden Thomas MBE (born 23 September 1948) is an English organist and pedagogue. She is Director of Music at St Giles-without-Cripplegate in the City of London.

She has compiled and edited twenty anthologies and other publications for the student organist and authored two textbooks. She has performed, lectured and taught in many locations in the UK, Europe, America, Canada and Japan. Many of the hundreds of organ students she has taught over the last 40 years are now professional musicians.

Marsden Thomas studied with Douglas Hawkridge, at the Royal Academy of Music and subsequently with Dame Gillian Weir. She initiated National Learn The Organ Year 1990 and participated in the follow-up campaign National Organ Teachers' Encouragement Scheme. Meanwhile, in 1992, she founded St. Giles International Organ School, which became The Royal College of Organists Academy Organ School in 2012.

She was awarded the MBE for Services to Organ Music in the 2015 New Years Honours List. She was awarded the RCO Medal by the Royal College of Organists in March 2017, being the first woman to receive this honour.

== Books ==
- New Oxford Organ Method (in partnership with Frederick Stocken) Oxford University Press 2020
- Graded Keyboard Musicianship (in partnership with Frederick Stocken) Oxford University Press 2017
- Oxford Bach Books for Organ (edited by Anne Marsden Thomas) Oxford University Press 2014
- Pedalling for Organists, Cramer Music 2014
- Oxford Service Music for Organ (edited by Anne Marsden Thomas), Oxford University Press 2010/2011
- The Organist's Hymnbook (edited by Anne Marsden Thomas) Cramer Music 2000
- A Graded Anthology For Organ: Book 1: A Practical Guide To Playing The Organ, Cramer Music 1997
- A Graded Anthology For Organ: Books 2-5 (edited by Anne Marsden Thomas) Cramer Music 1997
- The Church Year (in partnership with Ann Elise Smoot), Cramer Music 1996,
- Organ Practice, Royal School of Church Music 1993
