= Goymour Cuthbert =

British architect (1848–1902)

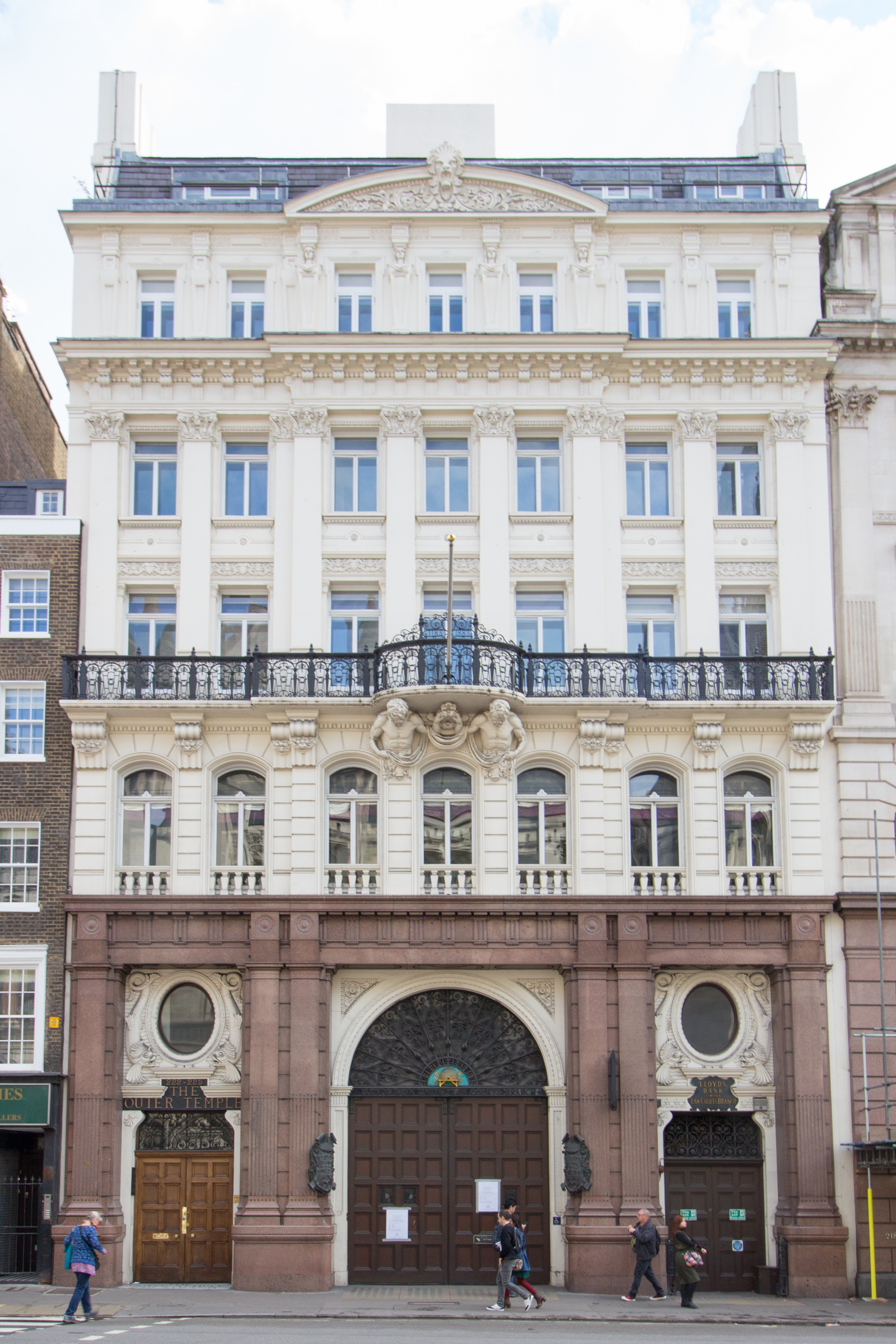
Former Lloyds Bank, 222 Strand, London 1882–83

Lieutenant Colonel Goymour Ranson Cuthbert VD ARIBA (1848–1902) was an English architect based in London.

== Life ==
He was born on 25 February 1849 in Paternoster Row, London, the son of John Ranson Cuthbert (1804–1876) and Sarah Mary Ann Hayward (1819–1889) and baptised on 3 April 1849 in Little Blakenham, Suffolk.

On 18 June 1883 he married Marion Linford (1857–1941) in St Mary's Church, Finchley and they had the following children.

- Enid Goymour Cuthbert (1884–1970)
- Hazel Haward Cuthbert (1886–1952)
- Berwyne Minna Cuthbert (1887–1970)
- Milroy Westell Cuthbert (1889–1970)
- Olaf Ranson Cuthbert (1891–1916)
- Galantha Midlred Cuthbert (1894–1934)

He died on 26 February 1902 in Eastbourne, Sussex leaving an estate valued at £6879 (equivalent to £731,000 in 2025).

== Military career ==
He joined the London Rifle Brigade as a private in July 1870 and took a commission in March 1885. He was promoted captain in April 1893 and received the honorary rank of major in November 1897 and the substantive rank in April 1901. He was made Lieutenant-Colonel in August 1902. He was an authority on tactics on which he lectured at the London Rifle Brigade headquarters, and before the Metropolitan Sergeants’ Tactical Association, a frequent umpire at War Games. In April 1900 he received a special certificate from the War Office as a qualified lecturer.

He was awarded the Volunteer Officers' Decoration in 1898.

== Career ==
He was pupil of architects Sir Henry Arthur Hunt, Charles Stephenson and Harry Jones. He was appointed an Associate of the Royal Institute of British Architects in 1882.

== Architectural works ==
- Palsgrave Hotel (then Lloyds Bank from 1894 to 2017), Royal Courts of Justice, Strand, London 1882–83 (with William Wimble) Grade II listed
- Union Bank of Australia, 73 Cornhill, London 1890 Grade II listed
- Wesleyan Centenary Hall, Bishopsgate Street, London 1901 (demolished)

== Sources ==
- Bradley, Simon; Pevsner, Nikolaus (2003). London 6: Westminster. The Buildings of England. Yale University Press. ISBN 978-0-300-09595-1.
