= Richard Limpus =

British organist and composer

Richard Davidge Limpus (10 September 1824 – 15 March 1875) was a British organist and composer, who is best known for being the founder of the Royal College of Organists.

== Background ==
Richard Limpus was the son of Richard Limpus, organist of Isleworth Old Church, who died on 1 November 1868.

He was a pupil of Samuel Sebastian Wesley. He was briefly appointed as organist of St Andrew Undershaft in 1847, resigning on his appointment as organist to the Philanthropic Society. Two years later he was appointed to St Michael, Cornhill, where he remained for the rest of his life.

He founded the College of Organists in 1864, later to become the Royal College of Organists. He was secretary to the College of Organists from 1864 to 1875.

== Compositions ==
He was a composer of songs and piano music.

=== Piano music ===
- La Belle Eliphalette, mazourka
- The Rosa Polka
- The British Court Quadrilles

=== Songs ===
- The Christmas holly
- Speak gently
- Sweet Evening Breeze, etc. Four-part song
- To ev'ry lovely Lady bright. Four-part song
- A Welcome to the Ivy, written by L. E. L

=== Ballads ===
- The Falling Dew-drop
- Her cheek was pale
- Oh! Lady, strike the Harp once more
- Violet Time. (begins: "I saw her")
- The Bride is away

=== Religious Music ===
- The Nicene Creed set to music in G major.

== Family ==
He married in 1848. His wife, who died, London, January 29, 1889, was a concert vocalist.

His brother, the Rev. P. Henry Limpus, was some time minor canon of St. George's Chapel, Windsor, and composer of an oratorio, " The Prodigal Son," London, May 10, 1870; Songs, etc. He died in 1893.

Limpus died at Queen Square, Bloomsbury, on 15 March 1875 and was buried at West Norwood Cemetery.

== Career ==
There was an incident during his career at St Michael, Cornhill as he was forced to appear at the Mayor's Court, Guildhall concerning non payment of a choir salary as compensation for unfair dismissal. This appeared to stem from an incident where many choir members were dismissed on Christmas Eve 1865 for their inability to attend at a day's notice, a Saturday morning service.

Cultural offices
Preceded by George William Arnull	Organist of St Michael, Cornhill; 1849-1875	Succeeded by Edward Henry Thorne
