= St Andrew Undershaft =

Coordinates: 51°30′49.18″N 0°4′52.72″W

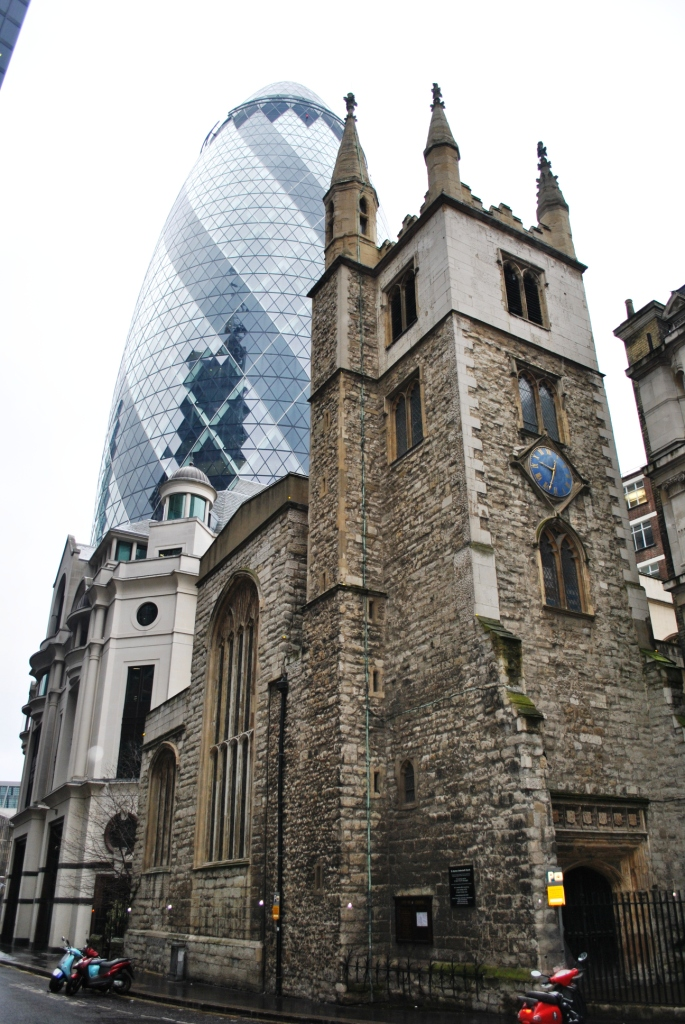
- St Andrew Undershaft in 2013

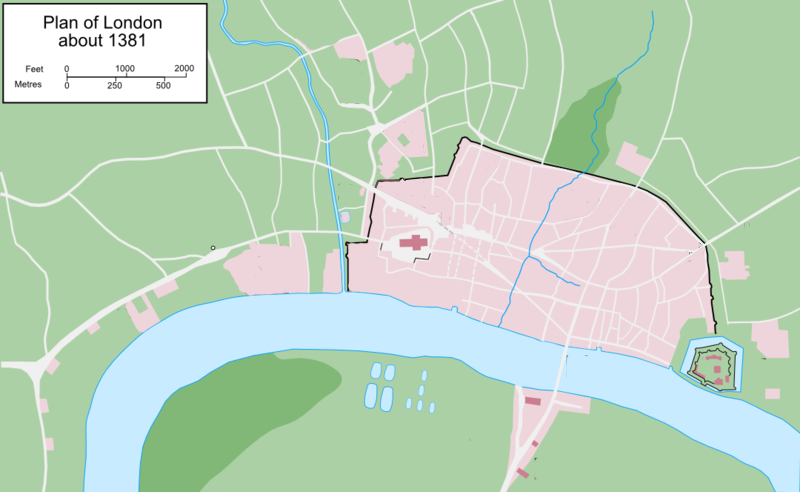
- Location: London, EC3
- Country: England
- Denomination: Church of England
- Churchmanship: Conservative Evangelical

History
- Founded: Before 1147
- Dedication: Saint Andrew

Architecture
- Heritage designation: Grade I listed building
- Style: Perpendicular
- Years built: 1532

Administration
- Diocese: London

St Andrew Undershaft is a Church of England church in the City of London, the historic nucleus and modern financial centre of London. It is located on St Mary Axe, within the Aldgate ward, and is a rare example of a City church that survived both the Great Fire of London and the Blitz.

The present building was constructed in 1532 but a church has existed on the site since the 12th century. Today, St Andrew Undershaft is administered from the nearby St Helen's Bishopsgate church.

== History ==
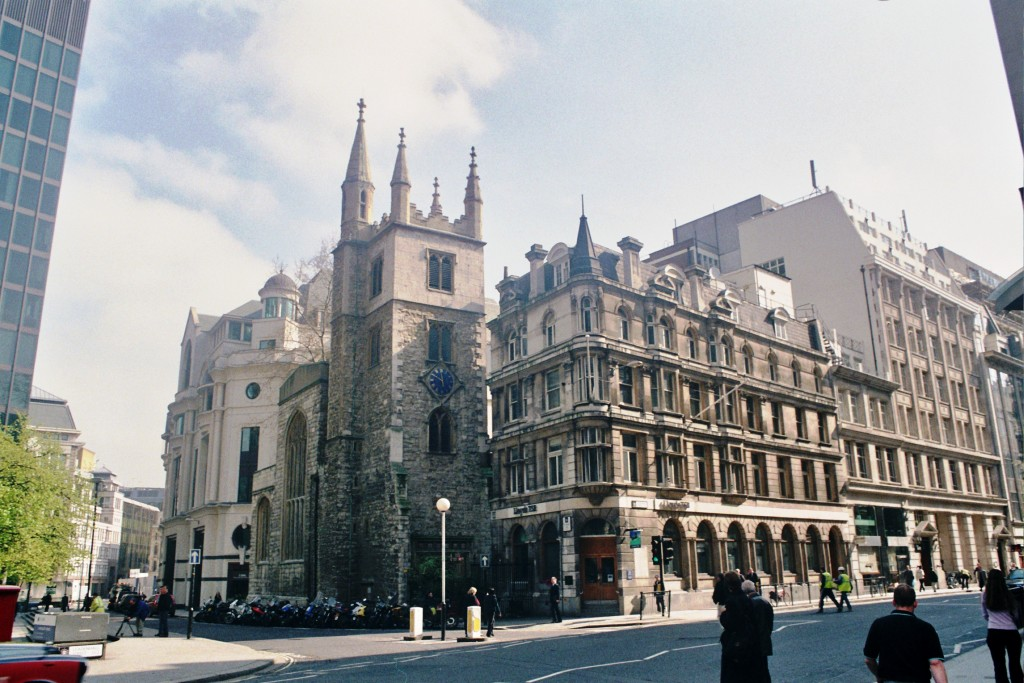
St Andrew Undershaft in 2001

The first church on the site, which today is bordered by St Mary Axe and Leadenhall Street, was built in medieval times, being recorded in 1147. It was rebuilt in the 14th century and again in 1532; this third incarnation of the building survives today. It is in the Perpendicular style with its entrance located at the base of its off-centre tower. The interior is divided into six bays, with many of the original fittings that survived the Victorian renovation. Formerly, St Andrew Undershaft had one of London's few surviving large stained-glass windows, installed in the 17th century, but this was destroyed in the Baltic Exchange bombing in 1992.

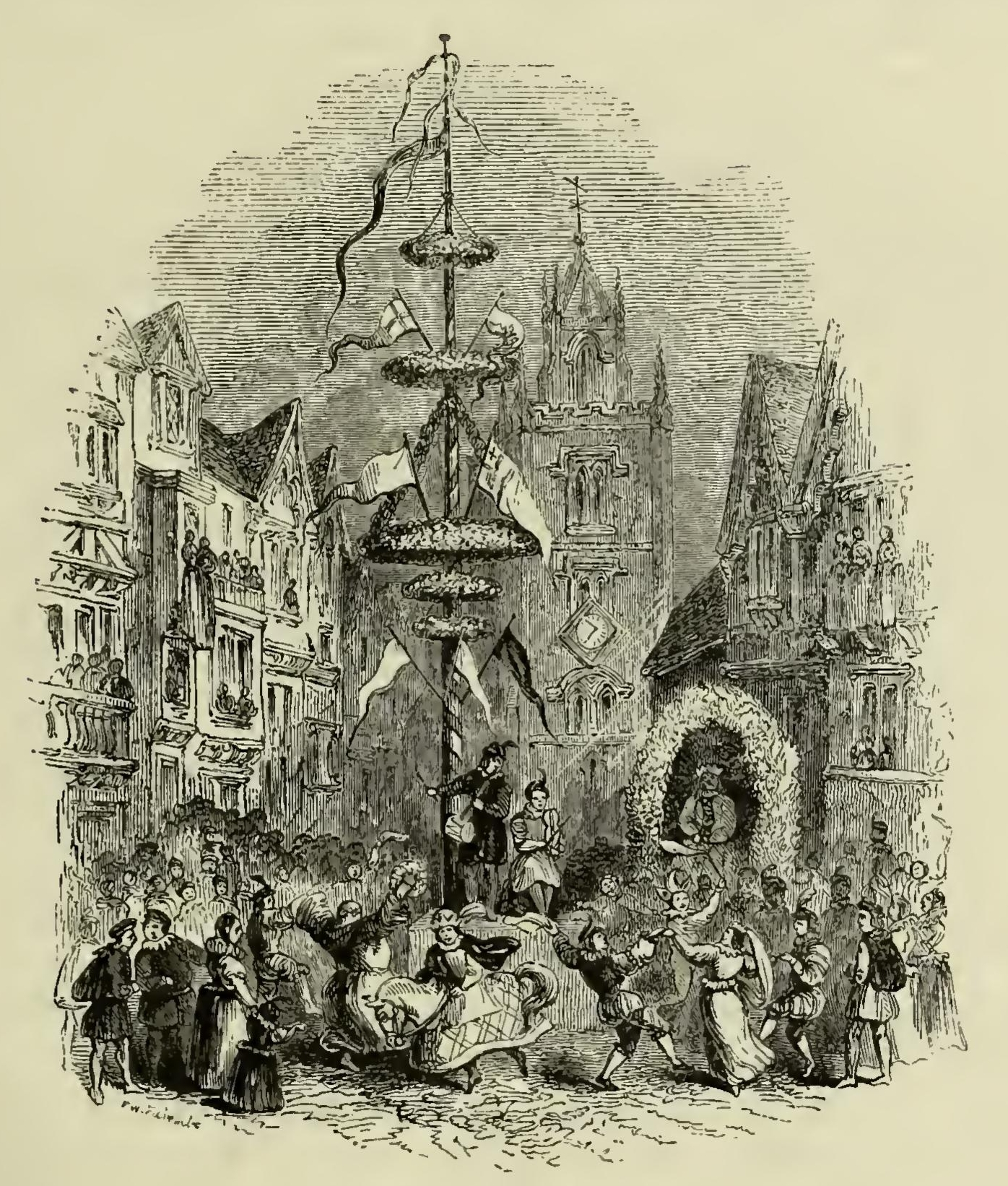
1841 illustration of the Undershaft maypole

The church's curious name derives from the shaft of the maypole that was traditionally set up each year opposite the church. The custom continued each spring until 1517, when student riots put an end to it, but the maypole itself survived until 1547 when it was seized by a mob and destroyed as a "pagan idol". According to John Stow, the chronicler who is buried here, they had it "raised from the hooks whereon it had rested for two-and-thirty years, sawn in pieces and burnt."

St Andrew Undershaft is now administered from the nearby church of St Helen's Bishopsgate. St Andrew Undershaft was designated a Grade I listed building on 4 January 1950.

The tower holds a peal of six bells in the key of G, with the tenor being cast in 1597 by Robert Mot. These are now hung dead (they can only be rung stationary) inside the tower.

== Organ ==
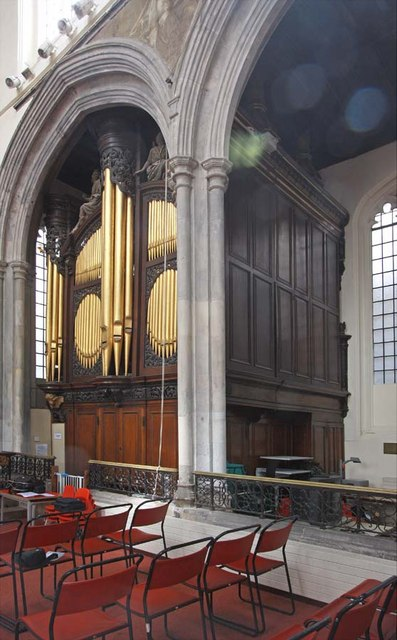
The organ in St Andrew Undershaft

The organ was installed in 1696 by Renatus Harris. A swell was added in 1750 by John Byfield. There have been other restorations and enhancements by George Pike England in 1810–11 and 1826. Further work was carried out by William Hill, Speechly and J. W. Walker & Sons, and Rushworth and Dreaper. A specification of the organ can be found on the National Pipe Organ Register

The organ is of such historic significance that it has been awarded a Grade I historic organ certificate by the British Institute of Organ Studies.

=== Organists ===
- William Goodgroome, 1696
- Philip Hart, 1697–1749
- John Worgan, 1749–1790
- Mary Allen, 1790–1836
- Richard Limpus, 1847
- William Rea, 1847–1858
- Elizabeth Stirling, 1858–1880
- C. F. Frye, 1880–1886
- W. M. Wait, 1887–1891
- Herbert George Preston, 1891–1912
- William A. S. Ballard, 1913–1921

== Notable people associated with the church ==
- Sir Thomas Offley, Lord Mayor of London 1563–64, was buried in 1582. The monument to Sir Thomas and his wife Joan (died 1578) survives in St Andrew Undershaft. Joan was a granddaughter of Sir Stephen Jennings, Lord Mayor, who funded the rebuilding of the church.
- John Stow, author of the Survey of London: buried in 1605. The quill pen held in the hand of his alabaster monument is renewed periodically by, alternately, the Lord Mayor of London and the Master of the Worshipful Company of Merchant Taylors, at a memorial service organised by the London and Middlesex Archaeological Society.
- Hugh Hamersley, Lord Mayor of London in 1627, whose memorial is in St Andrew Undershaft.
- Hans Holbein the Younger, a former parishioner of St Andrew Undershaft was possibly buried in the church.
- Frederick George Blomfield, rector of St Andrew Undershaft (1853–1879), son of Charles James Blomfield (Bishop of London) and father of Dorothy Gurney (poet and hymn writer).
- John Lawrence Toole, a comedian who was born and christened in St Andrew Undershaft.
- Fabian Stedman the father of church bellringing was buried in St Andrew Undershaft.
- Sir William Perkins, eminent merchant and founder of a charity school in Chertsey in 1725 for twenty-five boys and later twenty-five girls (Sir William Perkins's School), buried in St Andrew Undershaft in 1741

== See also ==
- List of buildings that survived the Great Fire of London
- List of churches in London
