= Bevis Marks =

Street in the City of London

Coordinates: 51.5150°N 0.0792°W

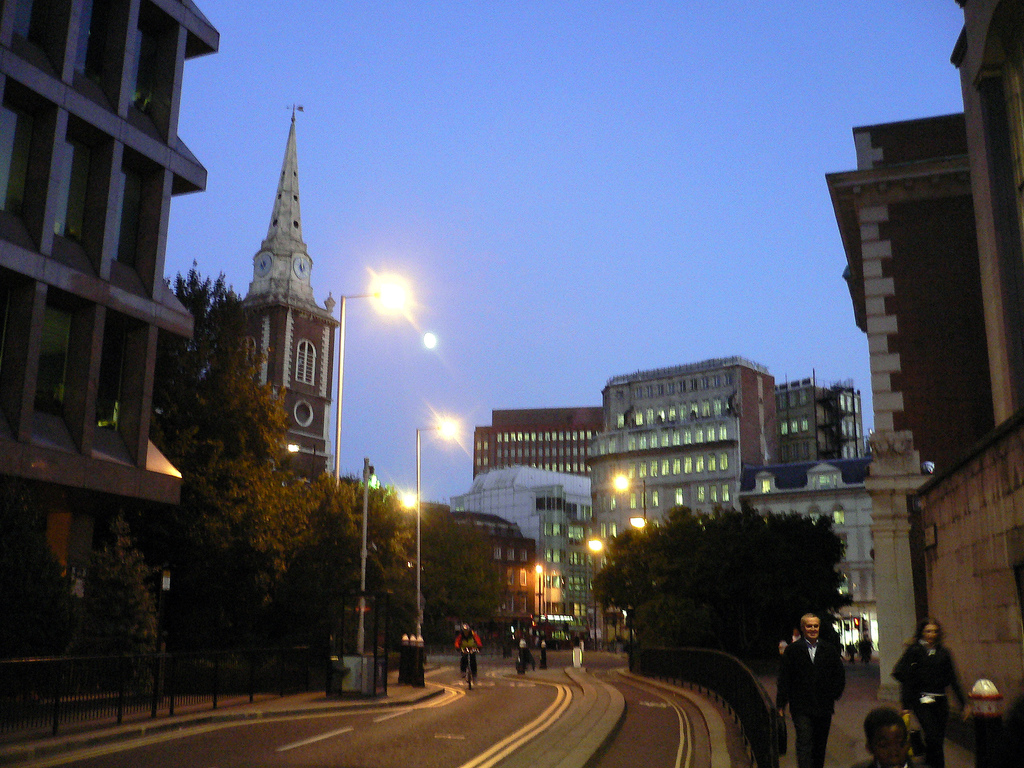
- Looking east down Bevis Marks towards St. Botolph's Aldgate

- Location within City of London
- Location: Aldgate, City of London, England, United Kingdom
- Postal code: EC3A

Other
- Known for: Bevis Marks Synagogue and for being mentioned several times in Charles Dickens's The Old Curiosity Shop

Bevis Marks, classified as part of the A1211, is a short street (about 150 m long) in the ward of Aldgate in the City of London. Traffic runs northwest in a one-way direction into Camomile Street, and parallel to Houndsditch which runs southeast one-way.

== History ==
The street name has been recorded as Bewesmarkes (1407), Bevys Marke (1450), Bevesmarkes (1513), Bevers-market (1630), and Beavis Markes (1677), prior to Bevis Marks (since 1720). The antiquarian John Stow believed the name to derive from the Abbots of Bury St Edmunds in Suffolk, in whose ownership this part of the city was until the Dissolution of the Monasteries. Evidently the "r" in "Bury" had been misread as a "v" in a mediaeval manuscript; "Marks" comes from maerc (march), the boundary of the abbots' London estate. Bury Street, adjoining to the south-west, also commemorates the association. At the dissolution, their possessions were passed to Sir Thomas Heneage, a gentleman of the Privy chamber in attendance on King Henry VIII. He is commemorated in the name of nearby Heneage Lane.

Bevis Marks is mentioned several times in Charles Dickens's The Old Curiosity Shop as the street where solicitor Sampson Brass has his offices.

== Notable sites ==
Bevis Marks is home to the Grade I listed Bevis Marks Synagogue, the oldest synagogue in the United Kingdom in continual use.
