= Baltic Exchange bombing =

1992 IRA attack in London, England

Coordinates: 51°30′53″N 00°04′51″W

- Part of the Troubles
- Location: St Mary Axe, City of London, United Kingdom
- Date: 10 April 1992; 21:20 (UTC)
- Target: City of London
- Attack type: Truck bomb
- Deaths: 3
- Injuries: 91
- Perpetrator: Provisional Irish Republican Army (IRA)

The Baltic Exchange bombing was an attack by the Provisional IRA on the City of London, Britain's financial centre, on 10 April 1992, the day after the general election that re-elected John Major from the Conservative Party as Prime Minister. The one-ton bomb – concealed in a van and consisting of a fertiliser device wrapped with a detonation cord made from 100 lb (45 kg) of Semtex – was the largest bomb detonated on mainland Britain since World War II. The bombing killed three people, injured 91 others, and severely damaged the Baltic Exchange and its surroundings.

== Background ==
Since the Provisional Irish Republican Army's campaign in the early 1970s, many commercial targets were attacked in England which would cause economic damage and severe disruption. In 1988 Gerry Adams, leader of Sinn Féin, and John Hume of the Social Democratic and Labour Party had begun a private dialogue to create a broad Irish nationalist coalition. British Prime Minister John Major had refused to openly enter into talks with Sinn Féin until the IRA declared a ceasefire. The risk of an IRA attack on the City of London had increased due to the lack of progress with political talks, resulting in a warning being circulated to all police forces in Britain highlighting intelligence reports of a possible attack, as it was felt the IRA had enough personnel, equipment and funds to launch a sustained campaign in England. Major won the general election on 9 April 1992. The next day, the bombing occurred.

== Bombing ==
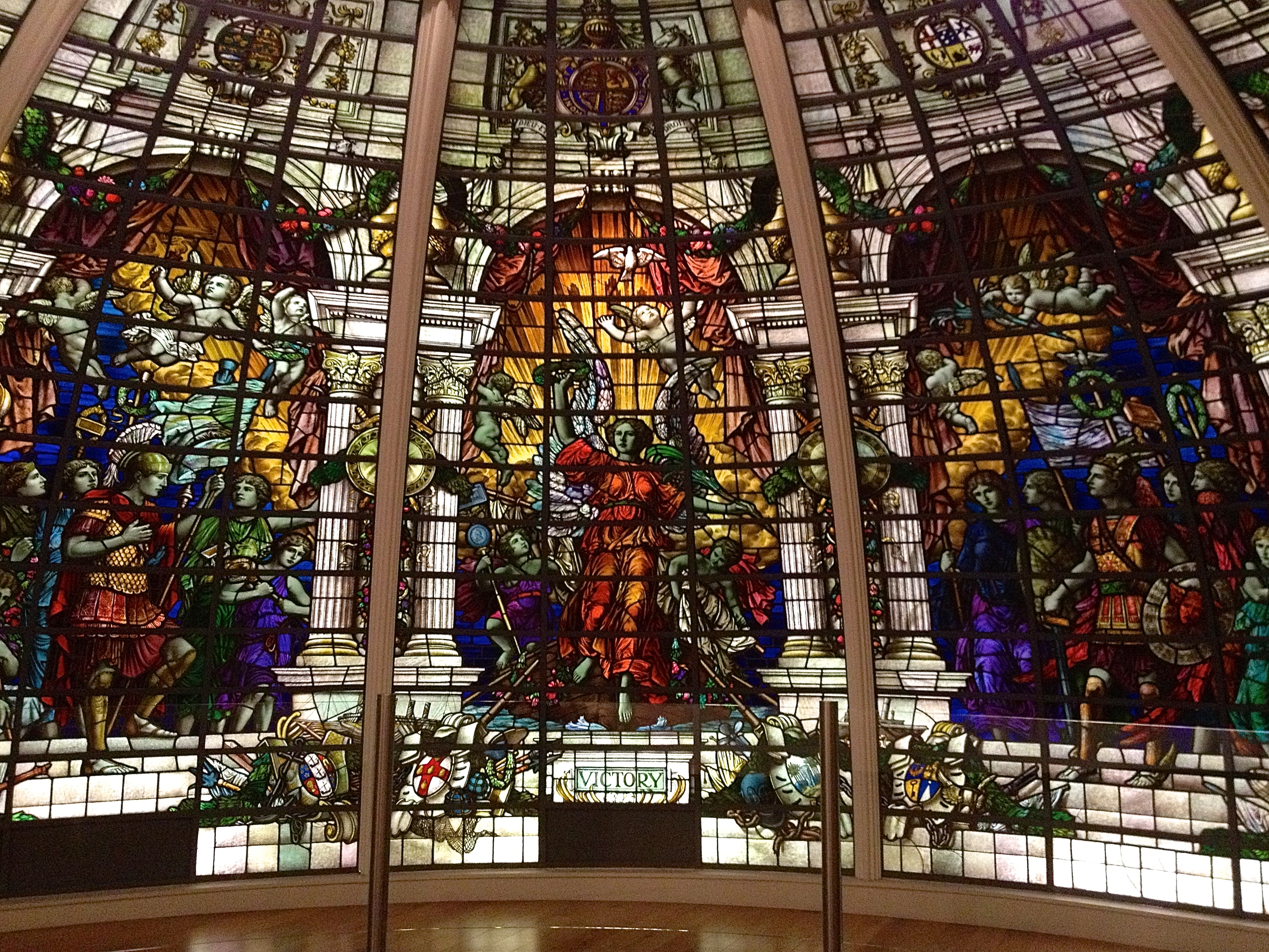
Stained glass windows from the old Baltic Exchange building, damaged in the bombing – now in the National Maritime Museum

On 10 April 1992 at 9:20 pm, a huge bomb was detonated in front of the Baltic Exchange building at 24–28 St Mary Axe, a street in the City. The façade of the offices was partially destroyed, and the rest of the building was extensively damaged. The bomb also caused heavy damage to surrounding buildings. It caused £800 million worth of damage (the equivalent of £1,720 million in 2025), £200 million more than the total damage caused by the 10,000 explosions that had occurred during the Troubles in Northern Ireland up to that point.

The IRA gave a telephone warning twenty minutes before the explosion, saying there was a bomb inside a van outside the Stock Exchange; but that is half a mile away from the actual location by the Baltic Exchange.

The homemade explosive was inside a white Ford Transit van parked in St Mary Axe. The components including the Libya-supplied Semtex were prepared in South Armagh, shipped from Ireland, and assembled in England. Behind their development were Rose Dugdale and Jim Monaghan. The attack had been planned for months and marked a technological advance in explosives manufacturing by the IRA. The bomb was described as the most powerful to hit London since the Luftwaffe raids of World War II.

A few hours later, another similarly large bomb went off in Staples Corner in north London, also causing major damage.

=== Victims ===
The bomb attack killed three people: Paul Butt, aged 29, who was passing in the street; Thomas Casey, 49, a Baltic Exchange attendant; and 15-year-old Danielle Carter, who was waiting in a car in St Mary Axe. Another 91 people were injured.

== Aftermath ==
The next day, the IRA claimed responsibility in a statement from Dublin. It is believed the IRA were trying to send a message to the Conservative Party who had won the election, in which Gerry Adams had lost his seat in the UK Parliament (which he had not taken up).

On 14 July 1992 anti-terrorist detectives believed they might have identified the bombers.

Many of the damaged buildings were once again badly damaged by the 1993 Bishopsgate bombing the following year. Both incidents contributed to the formation of the Traffic and Environmental Zone, the "Ring of Steel", in the City to protect it from further terrorism.

The Exchange sold its badly damaged historic building to be redeveloped under the auspices of English Heritage as a Grade II* site. However, the City and English Heritage later allowed it to be demolished, seeking instead a new landmark tall building. The site, together with that of the Chamber of Shipping at 30–32 St Mary Axe, is now home to a skyscraper commissioned by Swiss Re, commonly referred to as The Gherkin.

The stained glass windows of the First World War memorial in the Baltic Exchange suffered damage in the bomb blast; they were restored and are housed in the National Maritime Museum.
