= Baltic Exchange (building) =

Former building which was located at 24–28 St Mary Axe in London

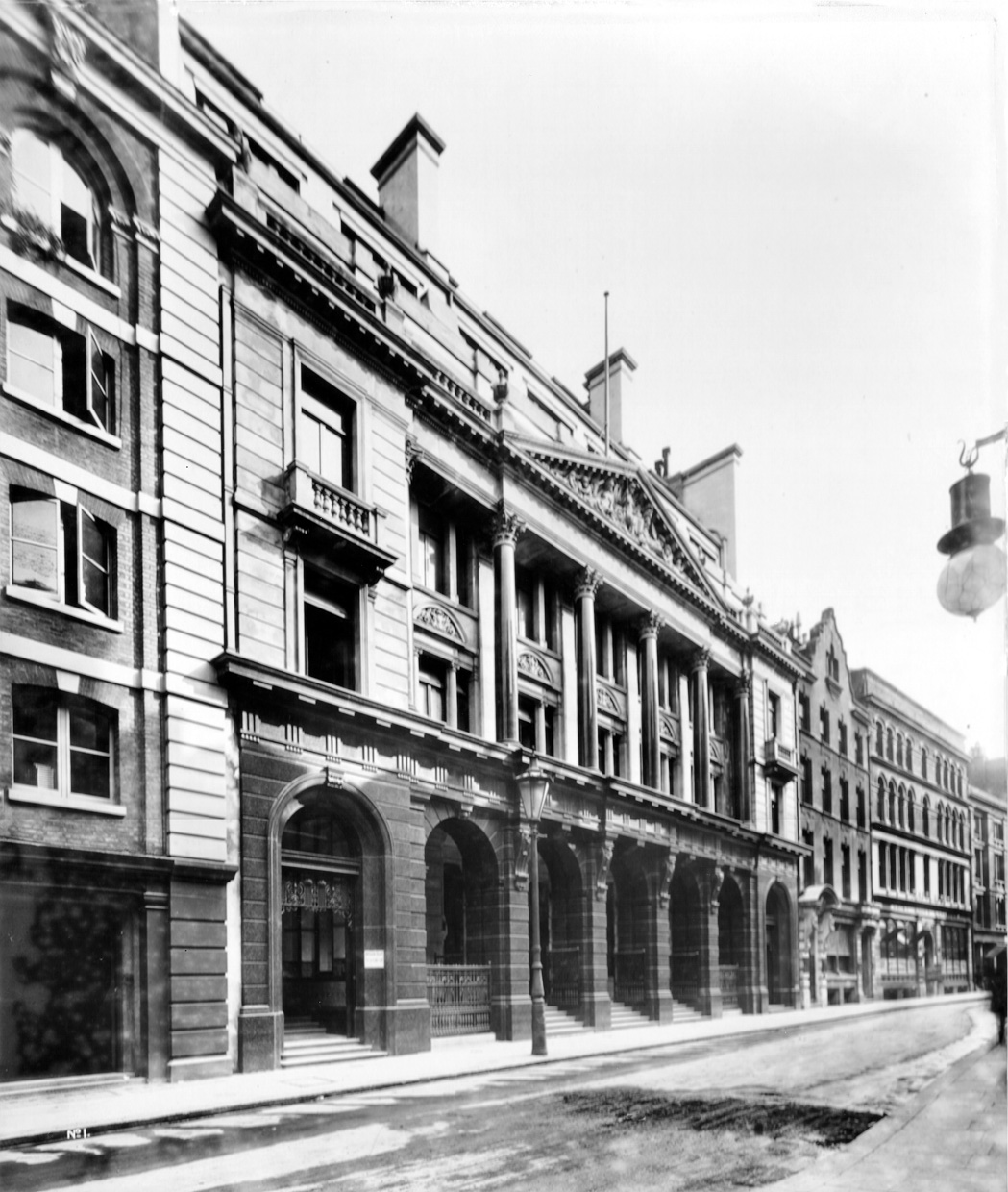
- The main building of the Baltic Exchange after its completion in 1903
- Interactive map of the Baltic Exchange area

General information
- Status: Demolished
- Type: Office
- Location: St Mary Axe; London, EC3
- Coordinates: 51.5146°N 0.0807°W
- Completed: 1903
- Destroyed: 10 April 1992

Design and construction
- Architects: Smith and Wimble
- Main contractor: George Trollope & Sons

The Baltic Exchange was an important listed building and historic landmark at 24–28 St Mary Axe in the City of London, occupied by the Baltic Exchange, a market for shipping, marine insurance, and information on maritime transportation. The building was known to some British architectural historians for its cathedral-like trading hall and the Baltic Exchange Memorial Glass, a stained glass war memorial.

It was severely damaged by an IRA bomb on 10 April 1992 and, despite objections from architectural conservationists, was demolished with permission from the planning minister John Prescott to make way for the site now occupied by 30 St Mary Axe ("The Gherkin"). The stained glass, which had only suffered superficial damage in the bomb blast, has been restored and can be seen at the National Maritime Museum.

== Construction ==
The building was designed by T.H. Smith and William Wimble and completed by George Trollope & Sons in 1903: it was subsequently listed as a Grade II* listed building.

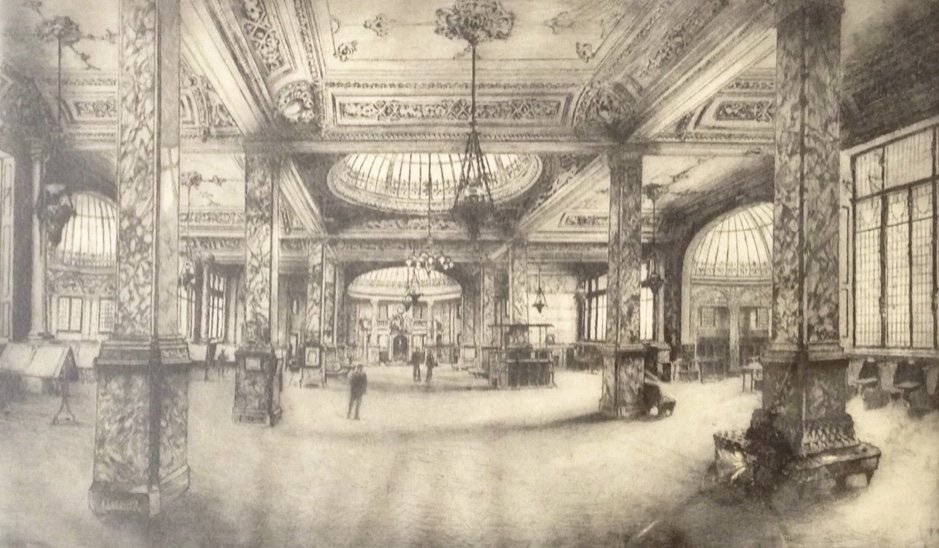
Photograph of engraving by Joseph Finnemore of the Baltic Exchange dated 1918

== Bombing of the exchange building ==
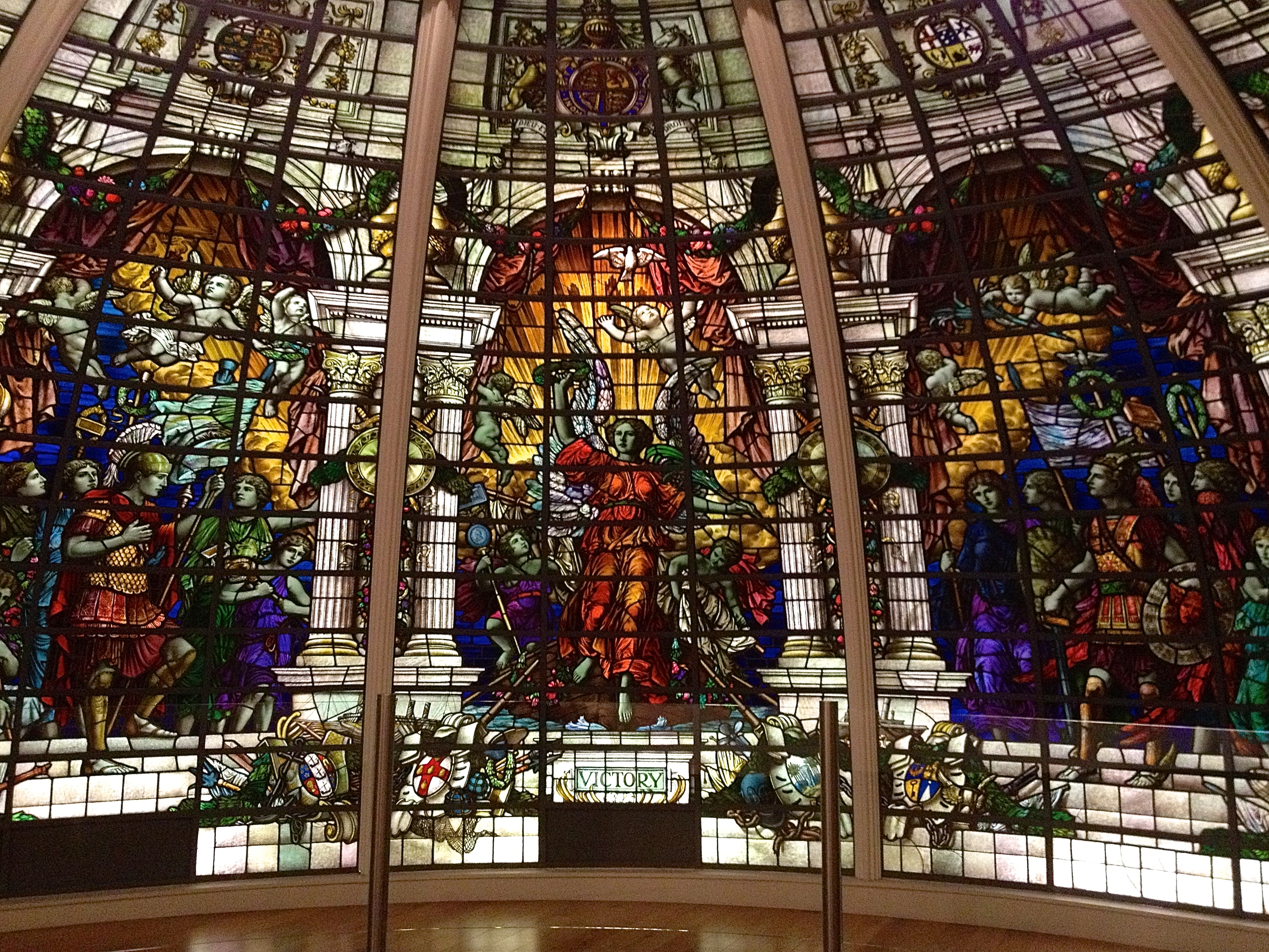
Stained glass window from the old Baltic Exchange building (now in the National Maritime Museum)

On 10 April 1992 at 9:20 pm, the façade of the Exchange's offices at 24–28 St Mary Axe was partially demolished, and the rest of the building was extensively damaged in a huge Provisional Irish Republican Army (IRA) bomb attack. The one-ton bomb killed three people whilst 91 were wounded. The bombing came a day after the General Election.

=== Aftermath ===
Architectural conservationists wanted to reconstruct what remained of the building, as it was the last remaining exchange floor in the City of London. English Heritage, the government's statutory conservation adviser, and the City of London Corporation insisted that any redevelopment must restore the building's old façade onto St Mary Axe. In 1995, Baltic Exchange, unable to afford such an expensive undertaking alone, sold the site to Trafalgar House. The remaining sculptures and masonry of the structurally unstable façade block on the site were photographed and dismantled before the sale; the interior of the Exchange Hall, which was regarded as stable, was initially sealed from the elements in the hope that it would be preserved in situ in any new development, but the new owners subsequently dismantled it and stored it offsite in 1995–96.

English Heritage later discovered that the damage was far more severe than it had previously thought. Accordingly, they stopped insisting on a full restoration. In 1998, what remained of the Exchange Hall was completely razed, with the permission of the planning minister John Prescott over the objections of architectural preservationists, including Save Britain's Heritage, which sought a judicial review of his decision.

The site, together with that of the Chamber of Shipping at 30–32 St Mary Axe, was used for the building of 30 St Mary Axe, commonly referred to as "The Gherkin".

The stained glass of the Baltic Exchange war memorial, which had only suffered superficial damage in the bomb blast, has been restored and is in the National Maritime Museum.

== Architectural salvage ==
Some one thousand tons of salvaged red granite, coloured marble, and Portland stone, together with much of the original plaster interior features that had survived the bomb, were first stored in a warehouse in Reading, before in 2003 being sold to a salvage dealer, Derek Davies, who moved them to Cheshire. In February 2003, Davies put the material up for sale on SalvoWEB, and late in 2005 sold it to another salvage dealer, Dennis Buggins. He then moved it from Cheshire to various barns around Canterbury in Kent and continued to advertise it on SalvoWEB.

== Sale of building and new life ==
After years on the market, in June 2006 an Estonian businessman, Eerik-Niiles Kross, found an advertisement for the components of the Baltic Exchange building on SalvoWEB while trawling the web for reclaimed flooring. He and his business partner Heiti Hääl bought the Baltic Exchange elements for £800,000 from Dennis Buggins of Extreme Architecture, and in June 2007 49 containers were shipped via Felixstowe to Tallinn. The components sold included fifty crates with arches, staircases, marble columns, a carving of Britannia and others, and Kross and Hääl said they would rebuild the building in central Tallinn like "Lego".

As of 2010, site planning and construction had been postponed, due to the 2008 financial crisis. In June 2016, an exhibition was held to allow visitors to see the building's pediment. Due to financial problems and planning conflicts, the components had by then remained stored in their shipping containers for a decade.

== Film location ==
Prior to its bombing in 1992, the Baltic Exchange building was used as one of the film locations for Howards End, released in 1992. The film was an adaptation of E. M. Forster's novel by the same name.
