= Houndsditch =

Street in the City of London

Coordinates: 51.5153°N 0.0787°W

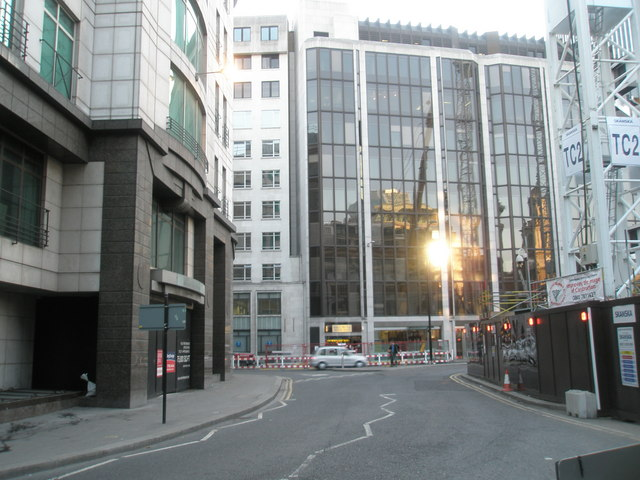
- Interactive map of Houndsditch
- Length: 0.2 mi (0.32 km)
- Location: London, United Kingdom
- Postal code: EC3
- Nearest train station: Liverpool Street
- North end: Outwich Street/Bishopsgate
- South end: St. Botolph Street

Houndsditch is a street running through parts of the Portsoken and Bishopsgate Without wards of the City of London, areas which are also a part of the East End of London. The road follows the line of the outside edge of the ditch which once ran outside the London Wall. The road took its name from the section of ditch between Bishopsgate and Aldgate. The name may derive from the widespread dumping of rubbish in this stretch of ditch; relating to the dumping of dead dogs, or the scavenging of the waste by feral dogs. Another possible origin of the name lies in the assertion in Arnold's Chronicle (1502) that the kennels for the City hunt were located by the former moat.

== History ==
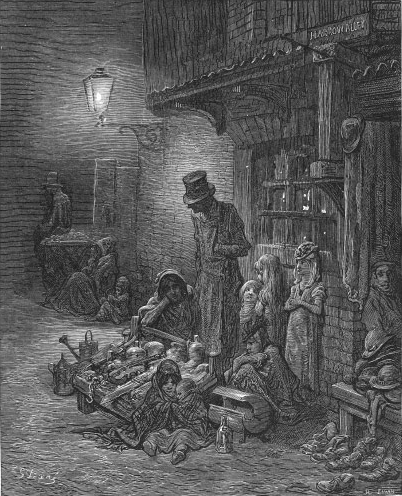
1872 engraving of Houndsditch by Gustave Doré

A ditch was dug outside Londinium's defensive wall by the Romans but was subsequently filled in and obliterated. The Danes under Cnut the Great constructed a town ditch to control access to the city. The ditch was reputedly known as a dumping ground for dead dogs, and a legend also recalls that Cnut had the body of infamous English traitor Eadric Streona dragged through the city by his heels, burnt with torches and then decapitated. His body was then ignominiously dumped over the wall, and into the ditch where hungry dogs were known to scavenge. It is also said that even the feral dogs refused to eat what was left of Edric.

The ditch was redug in 1211 as a part of the defences, and was about 75 feet (23 m) in width. The city authorities found it a continual problem to scour and clean as many adjacent houses found it a convenient place to dispose of filth and refuse. In 1595, levelling was first considered, although the street running alongside the ditch had first been paved in 1503. The name Houndsditche appears in the 13th century, and seems to relate to the quantity of rubbish and dead dogs thrown into it; previously it seems to have been referred to only by the appellation "the Ditch". Several dogs' skeletons were unearthed at Houndsditch in 1989.

London around 1300: The road followed the outside of the City Ditch between Bishopsgate and Aldgate.

By the turn of the 20th century, the street had become a thriving market in clothing and novelties, giving rise to one of London's leading department stores, the Houndsditch Warehouse, dubbed the "Selfridges of the Jewish Quarter".

In December 1910, anarchists killed three police officers who had interrupted them during an attempted burglary at a jeweller's shop at No. 119, Houndsditch. In January 1911, two of the gang were cornered and killed in the Siege of Sidney Street.

== Description ==
Approaching Bishopsgate, the modern office blocks do not occupy the full building plots, leaving some small areas empty. These were historically the sites of Plague pits.

The road forms part of the A1211 route from Barbican to Whitechapel. Traffic flows one-way south-eastward from Outwich Street down the modern Houndsditch, which continues onto St. Botolph Street, connecting to either Aldgate High Street (west) or Whitechapel High Street (east). The street is the location of a number of restaurants, bars and offices, and a short pedestrianised section of it runs along the north side of the Heron Tower, the tallest building in the City of London.

== Public transport ==
The nearest London Underground station is Aldgate and the closest mainline railway station is Liverpool Street. The street is served by London Buses routes 42, 78, 100, 135, and 205.

== In popular culture ==
Houndsditch is the location of the 1945 film Kitty, set in 1783. The street is described as a slum.
