= Bornhuetter–Ferguson method =

Method for calculating loss reserves

The Bornhuetter–Ferguson method is a loss reserving technique in insurance.

== Background ==
The Bornhuetter–Ferguson method was introduced in the 1972 paper "The Actuary and IBNR", co-authored by Ron Bornhuetter and Ron Ferguson.

Like other loss reserving techniques, the Bornhuetter–Ferguson method aims to estimate incurred but not reported insurance claim amounts. It is primarily used in the property and casualty and health insurance fields.

Generally considered a blend of the chain-ladder and expected claims loss reserving methods, the Bornhuetter–Ferguson method uses both reported or paid losses as well as an a priori expected loss ratio to arrive at an ultimate loss estimate. Simply, reported (or paid) losses are added to a priori expected losses multiplied by an estimated percent unreported. The estimated percent unreported (or unpaid) is established by observing historical claims experience.

The Bornhuetter–Ferguson method can be used with either reported or paid losses.

== Methodology ==
There are two algebraically equivalent approaches to calculating the Bornhuetter–Ferguson ultimate loss.

In the first approach, undeveloped reported (or paid) losses are added directly to expected losses (based on an a priori loss ratio) multiplied by an estimated percent unreported.

$\mathrm{BF} = L + \mathrm{ELR} \cdot \mathrm{Exposure} \cdot (1 - w)$

In the second approach, reported (or paid) losses are first developed to ultimate using a chain-ladder approach and applying a loss development factor (LDF). Next, the chain-ladder ultimate is multiplied by an estimated percent reported. Finally, expected losses multiplied by an estimated percent unreported are added (as in the first approach).

$\mathrm{BF} = L \cdot \mathrm{LDF} \cdot w + \mathrm{ELR} \cdot \mathrm{Exposure} \cdot (1 - w)$

The estimated percent reported is the reciprocal of the loss development factor.

Incurred but not reported claims can then be determined by subtracting reported losses from the Bornhuetter–Ferguson ultimate loss estimate.
