= Reinsurance to close =

Reinsurance to close (RITC) is a business transaction whereby the estimated future liabilities of an insurance company are reinsured into another, in order that the profitability of the former can be finally determined. It is most closely associated with the Lloyd's of London insurance market that comprises numerous competing "syndicates", and in order to close each accounting year and declare a profit or loss, each syndicate annually "reinsures to close" its books. In most cases, the liabilities are simply reinsured into the subsequent accounting year of the same syndicate, however, in some circumstances the RITC may be made to a different syndicate or even to a company outside of the Lloyd's market.

== History ==
At Lloyd's, traditionally each year of each syndicate is a separate enterprise, and the profitability of each year is determined essentially by payments for known liabilities (claims) and money reserved for unknown liabilities that may emerge in the future on claims that have been incurred but not reported (IBNR). The estimation of the quantity of IBNR is difficult and can be inaccurate.

Capital providers typically "joined" their syndicate for one calendar year only, and at the end of the year the syndicate as an ongoing trading entity was effectively disbanded. However, usually the syndicate re-formed for the next calendar year with more or less the same capital membership. In this way, a syndicate could have a continuous existence for many years, but each year was accounted for separately. Since some claims can take time to be reported and then paid, the profitability of each syndicate took time to realise. The practice at Lloyd's was to wait three years from the beginning of the year in which the business was written before "closing" the year and declaring a result. For example, for the 1984 year a syndicate would ordinarily declare its result at 31 December 1986. The syndicate's 1984 members would therefore be paid any profit during 1987 (in proportion to their share of the total capacity of the syndicate); conversely, they would have to reimburse the syndicate during 1987 for their share of any 1984 loss.

For the estimated future claims liabilities, the syndicate bought an RITC; the premium for the reinsurance was equal to the amount of the reserve. In other words, rather than placing the reserve in a bank to earn interest, the syndicate transferred its liabilities for future claims to a reinsurer, thus allowing the year to be closed and the profit or loss to be declared. For example, the members of syndicate number '1' in 1984 reinsured the future liabilities of the members of syndicate '1' in 1985. The membership might be the same, or it might have changed.

== Disadvantages ==
A capital provider for a syndicate with a long history of RITC transactions could – and often did – become liable for losses on insurance policies written many years or even decades previously. If the reserves had been accurately estimated and the appropriate RITC premium paid every year, then this would not present an issue. However, it became apparent during the asbestosis crisis at Lloyd's in the 1990s that in many cases this had not been possible: a huge surge in asbestos and pollution related losses was not foreseen or adequately reserved for. Therefore, the amounts of money transferred from earlier years by successive RITC premiums to cover these losses were grossly insufficient, and the later members had to pay the shortfall.

Similarly, within a stock company, an initial reserve for future claims liabilities is set aside immediately, in year one. Any deterioration in that initial reserve in subsequent years will result in a reduced profit in the later years, and a consequently reduced dividend and/or share price for shareholders in those later years, whether or not those shareholders in the later year are the same as the shareholders in year one. Arguably, Lloyd's practice of using reserves in year three to establish the RITC premiums should have resulted in a more equitable handling of losses such as asbestosis than would the stock company approach. Nevertheless, the difficulties in correctly estimating losses such as these overwhelmed even Lloyd's extended process.

== See also ==
- Actuarial science
- Loss reserving
