= Lloyd's of London =

Insurance market in England

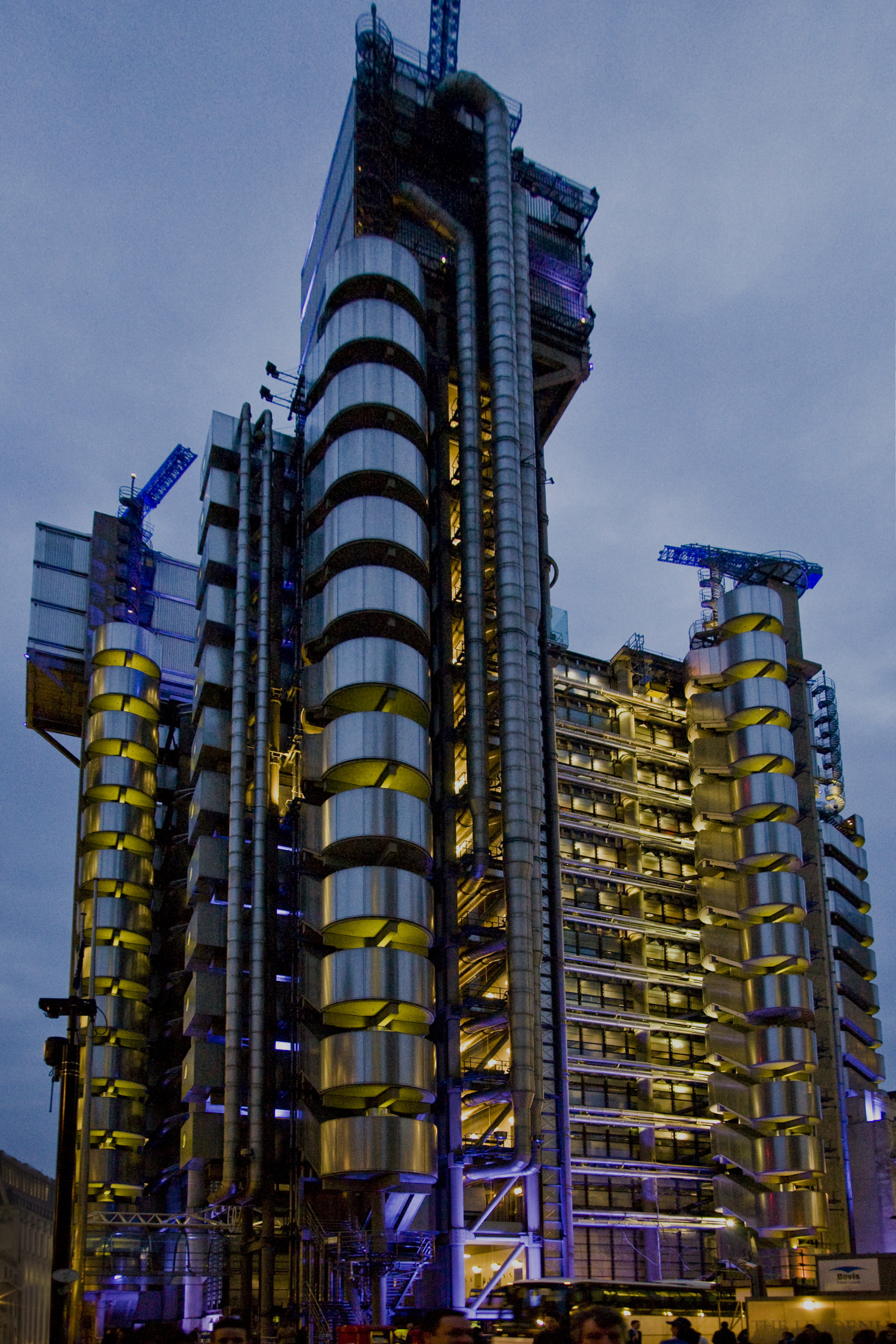
- The 1986 Lloyd's building in Lime Street, London
- Type: Insurance and reinsurance market
- Founded: c. 1689; 337 years ago
- Founder: Edward Lloyd
- Headquarters: London, EC3
- Key people: Charles Roxburgh, Chair; Patrick Tiernan, CEO
- Number of employees: 2,000
- Website: www.lloyds.com

Lloyd's of London, generally known simply as Lloyd's, is an insurance and reinsurance market located in London, England. Unlike most of its competitors in the industry, it is not an insurance company; rather, Lloyd's is a corporate body governed by the Lloyd's Act 1871 and subsequent acts of Parliament. It operates as a partially mutualised marketplace within which multiple financial backers, grouped in syndicates, come together to pool and spread risk. These underwriters, or "members", include both corporations and private individuals, the latter being traditionally known as "Names".

The business underwritten at Lloyd's is predominantly general insurance and reinsurance, with a small amount of term life insurance. The market has its roots in marine insurance and traces its origins to a coffee-house established by Edward Lloyd on Tower Street c. 1689, making it one of the oldest insurance companies in the world. Today, it has a dedicated building on Lime Street, a Grade I historic landmark. Traditionally business is transacted at each syndicate's "box" in the underwriting room, with the policy document being known as a "slip", but in recent years it has become increasingly common for business to be conducted remotely and electronically.

The market's motto is Fidentia, Latin for "confidence", and it is closely associated with the Latin phrase uberrima fides, or "utmost good faith", representing the ideal relationship between underwriters and brokers.

Having survived multiple scandals and significant challenges through the second half of the 20th century, most notably the asbestosis losses which engulfed the market, Lloyd's today promotes its strong financial "chain of security" available to promptly pay all valid claims. As of 31 December 2024, this chain consists of £92.5 billion of syndicate-level assets, £30.5bn of members' "funds at Lloyd's", and £2.9bn in a third mutual link which includes the "Central Fund" and which is under the control of the Council of Lloyd's.

In 2023 there were 78 syndicates managed by 51 "managing agencies" that collectively wrote £52.1bn of gross premiums on risks placed by 381 registered brokers. Around half of Lloyd's premiums are paid from North America and around one quarter from Europe. Direct insurance represents roughly two-thirds of the premiums, mostly covering property and casualty liability, while the remaining one-third is reinsurance.

== History ==
=== 17th–19th centuries: Formation and first Lloyd's Act ===
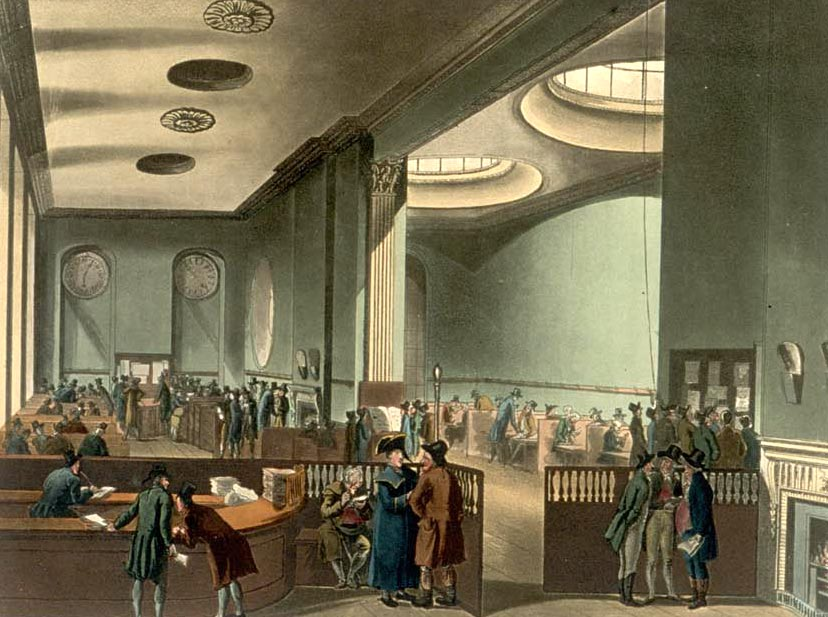
The Subscription Room in the early 19th century

The market began in Lloyd's Coffee House, owned by Edward Lloyd, on Tower Street in the City of London. The first reference to it can be traced to the London Gazette in 1688. The establishment was a popular place for sailors, merchants, and ship-owners, and Lloyd catered to them with reliable shipping news. The coffee house soon became recognised as an ideal place for obtaining marine insurance. The shop evolved into a meeting place for people of all types of maritime occupations, who would make bets on which ships would make it back to port. Soon, the captains of ships that were suggested to fail to return were betting against the return of other ships. It was the start of Lloyd's insurance. During this time, the coffee house was also frequented by mariners involved in the slave trade. Historian Eric Williams noted that "Lloyd's, like other insurance companies, insured slaves and slave ships, and was vitally interested in legal decisions as to what constituted 'natural death' and 'perils of the sea'". Lloyd's obtained a monopoly on maritime insurance related to the slave trade and maintained it until the abolition of the slave trade in 1807.

Just after Christmas 1691, the small club of marine insurance underwriters relocated to No. 16 Lombard Street; a blue plaque on the site commemorates this. This arrangement carried on until 1773, long after the death of Edward Lloyd in 1713, when the participating members of the insurance arrangement formed a committee and underwriter John Julius Angerstein acquired two rooms at the Royal Exchange in Cornhill for "The Society of Lloyd's". In July 1803, the Lloyd's Patriotic Fund was established by a group of Lloyd's underwriters.

Lloyd's Act 1871 (Note: Section 1.)
- Act of Parliament
- Parliament of the United Kingdom
- Long title: An Act for incorporation the members of the Establishment or Society formerly held at Lloyd's Coffee House in the Royal Exchange in the city of London, for the effecting of Marine Insurance, and generally known as Lloyd's; and for other purposes.
- Citation: 34 & 35 Vict. c. xxi
- Territorial extent: United Kingdom

Dates
- Royal assent: 25 May 1871
- Commencement: 25 May 1871 (Note: Section 2.)
Other legislation
Amended by	Lloyd's Act 1911; Merchant Shipping Act 1995

Status: Amended

Text of statute as originally enacted

The Royal Exchange was destroyed by fire in 1838, forcing Lloyd's into temporary offices at South Sea House, Threadneedle Street. The Royal Exchange was rebuilt by 1844, but many of Lloyd's early records were lost in the blaze. The Lloyd's Act 1871 (34 & 35 Vict. c. xxi), the first Lloyd's Act, was passed in Parliament which gave the business a sound legal footing. Around that time, it was unusual for a Lloyd's syndicate to have more than five or six backers; this lack of underwriting capacity meant Lloyd's was losing many of the larger risks to rival insurance companies. A marine underwriter named Frederick Marten is credited for first identifying this issue and creating the first "large syndicate", initially of 12 capacity providers. By the 1880s Marten's syndicate had outgrown many of the major insurance companies outside Lloyd's.

=== Early 20th century: San Francisco earthquake and first Lloyd's building ===
On 18 April 1906, a major earthquake and resulting fires destroyed over 80 per cent of the city of San Francisco. This event was to have a profound influence on building practices, risk modelling and the insurance industry.

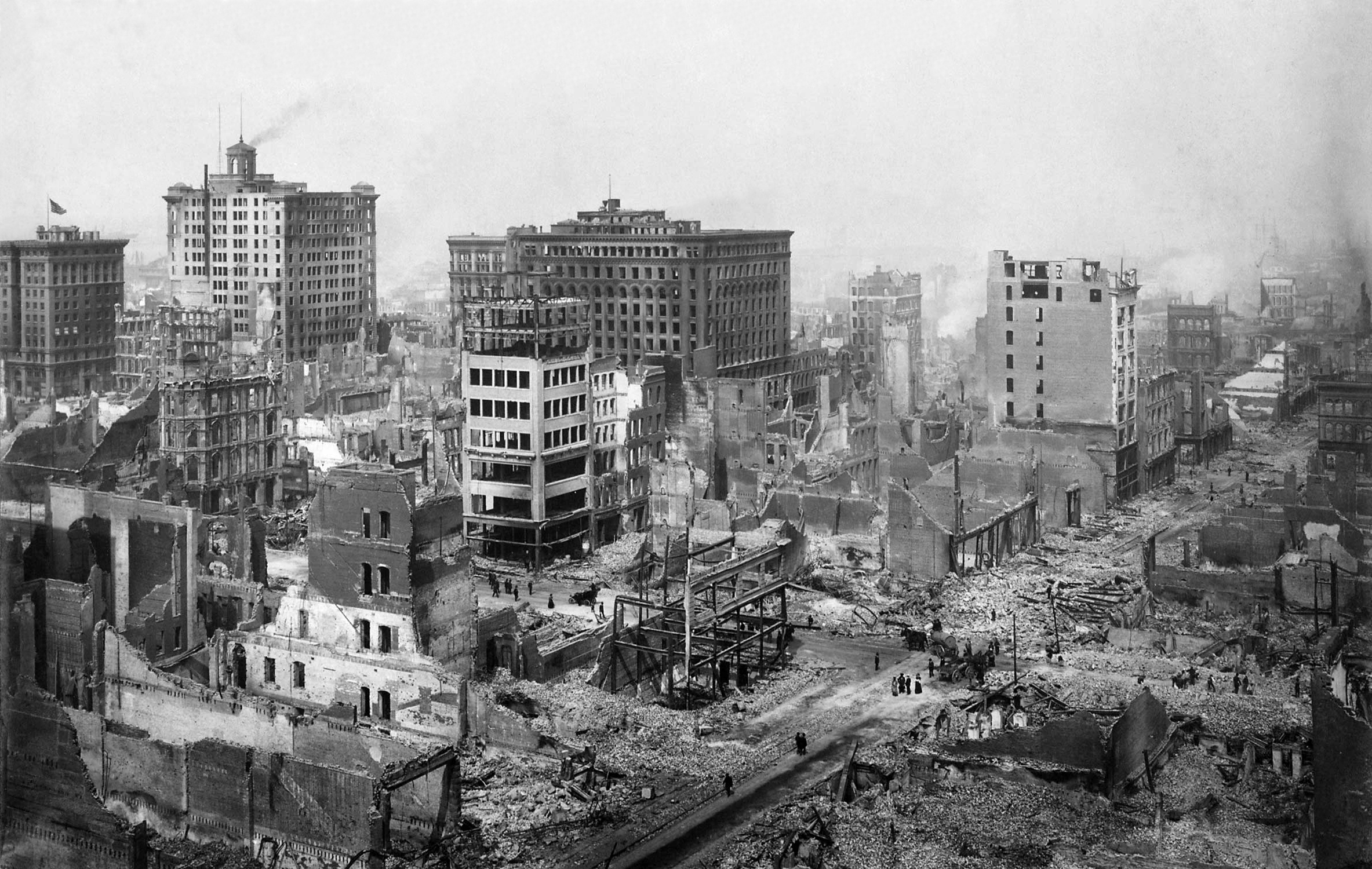
The 1906 San Francisco earthquake caused substantial losses for Lloyd's underwriters.

Lloyd's losses from the earthquake and fires were substantial, even though the writing of insurance business overseas was viewed with some wariness at the time. While some insurance companies were denying claims for fire damage under their earthquake policies or vice versa, one of Lloyd's leading underwriters, Cuthbert Heath, famously instructed his San Francisco agent to "pay all of our policy-holders in full, irrespective of the terms of their policies". The prompt and full payment of all claims helped to cement Lloyd's reputation for reliable claim payments and as an important trading partner for US brokers and policyholders. It was estimated that around 90 per cent of the damage to the city was caused by the resultant fires and as such, since 1906 "fire following earthquake" has generally been a specified insured peril under most policies. Heath is also credited for introducing the now widely used "excess of loss" reinsurance protection for insurers following the San Francisco quake.

Heath had become an underwriting member of Lloyd's in 1880, upon reaching the minimum age of 21, on J. S. Burrows' syndicate. Within a year he was underwriting for himself on a three-man syndicate; in 1883 he also opened a brokerage business. In 1885, he wrote the first fire reinsurance contract, reinsuring the Hand in Hand Insurance Company and marking the start of Heath's push to diversify the market into "non-marine" business. He also wrote Lloyd's first burglary insurance policy, its first "all risks" jewellery policy and invented "jewellers' block" cover. Later, during World War I he offered air-raid insurance, protecting against the risk of German strategic bombing.

Lloyd's Act 1911
- Act of Parliament
- Parliament of the United Kingdom
- Long title: An Act to extend the objects of and confer further powers on Lloyd's and to amend the Lloyd's Act 1871.
- Citation: 1 & 2 Geo. 5. c. lxii
- Territorial extent: United Kingdom

Dates
- Royal assent: 18 August 1911
- Commencement: 18 August 1911 (Note: The Acts of Parliament (Commencement) Act 1793.)
Other legislation
Amends	Lloyd's Act 1871
Repeals/revokes	Lloyd's Act 1888

Status: Amended

Text of statute as originally enacted

The subsequent Lloyd's Act 1911 (1 & 2 Geo. 5. c. lxii) set out the society's objectives, which include the promotion of its members' interests and the collection and dissemination of information.

A year later in April 1912 Lloyd's suffered perhaps its most famous loss: the sinking of the Titanic. It was insured for £1 million (equivalent to £124 million in 2024), which represented 20 per cent of the entire market's capacity, making it the largest marine risk ever insured. The record of its sinking in the 1912 "Loss Book" is on display in the Lloyd's building.

The society moved into its first owned, dedicated building in 1928. It was located at 12 Leadenhall Street and had been designed by Sir Edwin Cooper.

=== 1960s: Hurricane Betsy and the Cromer report ===
In 1965 Lloyd's wrote the first satellite insurance policy, covering Intelsat I in pre-launch.

Later that year, when Lloyd's had around 6,000 members on 300 syndicates, Hurricane Betsy struck the Gulf of Mexico coastlines, costing the market over £50 million. The catastrophe halted the capital that hitherto had been pouring into Lloyd's, and twice as many members left between 1965 and 1968 as had left over the prior eight years. It was soon realised that the membership of the Society, which had been largely made up of market participants, was too small in relation to the market's capitalisation and the risks that it was taking on.

Lloyd's response was to commission a secret internal inquiry in 1968, headed by Lord Cromer, a former Governor of the Bank of England. This report advocated the widening of membership to non-market participants, including non-British subjects and then women, and the reduction of the onerous capitalisation requirements (thus creating a minor investor known as a "mini-Name"). The report also drew attention to the danger of conflicts of interest. The liability of the individual Names was unlimited, and thus all their personal wealth and assets were at risk.

=== 1970s: Changes in the financial markets ===
During the 1970s, a number of issues arose which were to have significant influence on the course of the Society. The first was the tax structure in the UK: for a time, capital gains were taxed at up to 40 per cent (nil on gilts); earned income was taxed in the top bracket at 83 per cent, and investment income in the top bracket at 98 per cent. Lloyd's income counted as earned income, even for Names who did not work at Lloyd's, and this heavily influenced the direction of underwriting: in short, it was desirable for syndicates to make a (small) underwriting loss but a (larger) investment gain. The investment gain was typically achieved by "bond washing" or "gilt stripping": selling the gilt or other bond cum dividend and buying it back ex-dividend, thus forfeiting the interest income in exchange for a tax-free capital gain. Syndicate funds were also moved offshore (which later created problems through fraud and self-dealing).

Because Lloyd's was a tax shelter as well as an insurance market, the second issue affecting it was an increase in its external membership: by the end of the 1970s, the number of passive investors dwarfed the number of underwriters working in the market. The third issue related to a series of losses as a result of scandal. During the decade a number of scandals had come to light, including the collapse of F. H. "Tim" Sasse's non-marine syndicate 762, which had issued large fire insurance claims that had highlighted both the lack of regulation and the lack of legal powers of the Committee of Lloyd's (as it was then) to manage the Society.

=== Late 1970s: Sasse scandal and other issues ===
The collapse of the Sasse syndicate came after it wrote a "binding authority" in 1975 that delegated underwriting authority to Florida-based expatriate Dennis Harrison to write property and fire risks through his Den-Har Underwriters agency, even though Den-Har was not an approved Lloyd's coverholder (a fact noticed neither by Sasse nor Lloyd's Non-Marine Association). Den-Har had suspected Mafia links and many of the risks written were rigged: typically dilapidated buildings in slums such as New York's south Bronx, which soon burned down after being insured for large sums.

Once the three-year Lloyd's accounting period passed, the 110 Names on syndicate 762 were told they faced substantial losses, from mostly fraudulent claims. Sasse's reinsurer, the Instituto de Resseguros do Brasil (IRB), refused to pay its share of the fraudulent losses. The Names (few in number for such large losses) took legal action and ultimately paid only £6.25m of c. £15m of Den-Har claims under the 1976 year, leaving the Corporation of Lloyd's to pay the remainder. The Corporation also paid the near £7m loss for 1977. Lloyd's banned Sasse from the market for life in 1985; he died on 28 February 1987.

Sasse had also been one of 57 underwriters on other syndicates that wrote loss-making "computer leasing" policies in the late 1970s. These claims ultimately ran above $450m, wiping out more than half the entire market's profit in a single year.

Problems also developed out of the Oakley Vaughan agency run by brothers Edward and Charles St George, which had written far more business than its capacity allowed in order to invest premium to take advantage of high interest rates. By writing swathes of business regardless of whether the premiums were adequate, the St Georges left their Names with serious losses. Lloyd's had commissioned investigations into Oakley Vaughan, but investigators were denied access to the books and relied only on reassurances that the agency was profitable.

Arising simultaneously with these developments were wider issues: first, in the US, an ever-widening interpretation by the courts of insurance coverage in relation to workers' compensation for asbestosis-related claims, which created a huge hole in Lloyd's loss-payment reserves, which was initially not recognised and then not acknowledged. Second, by the end of the decade, almost all of the market agreements, such as the Joint Hull Agreement, which were effectively cartels mandating minimum terms, had been abandoned under pressure of competition. Third, new specialised policies had arisen which had the effect of concentrating risk: these included "run-off" policies, under which the liability of previous underwriting years would be transferred to the current year, and "time and distance" policies, whereby reserves would be used to buy a guarantee of future income.

=== Early 1980s: New Lloyd's Act, Lioncover and Centrewrite ===
==== Fisher report ====
In 1980, Sir Henry Fisher was commissioned by the Council of Lloyd's to produce the foundation for a new Lloyd's Act. The recommendations of his report addressed the "democratic deficit" and the lack of regulatory muscle.

Fisher, working with Richard Southwell QC, drafted the Lloyd's Act 1982 (c. xiv) which further redefined the structure of the business and was designed to give external Names, introduced in response to the Cromer report, a say in the running of the business through a new governing Council. The main purpose of the 1982 Act was to separate the ownership of the managing agents of the underwriting syndicates from the ownership of the brokering houses (which acted as intermediaries, not as underwriters), with the objective of removing conflicts of interest.

==== PCW scam and Lioncover ====
Immediately after the passing of the 1982 act, evidence came to light and internal disciplinary proceedings were commenced against a number of underwriters who had allegedly siphoned money from their syndicates to their own accounts. These individuals included a deputy chairman of Lloyd's and some of its leading underwriters. Successful marine underwriter Ian Posgate, who at one point had written 20 per cent of the Lloyd's marine market, was expelled under suspicions but later acquitted of criminal charges. His name remained tarnished and he did not return to the market, retiring to run his Oxfordshire farm until his death in 2017, aged 87. A greater debacle arose when Peter Cameron-Webb and Peter Dixon, of PCW Underwriting Agencies, allegedly defrauded their business of some $60m through rigged reinsurance transactions and fled to the United States, never to return.

The emergence of fraud at PCW was the first in a series of events that led to the resignation of Lloyd's chairman Sir Peter Green in 1983. Lloyd's was later forced to make a settlement with the roughly 3,000 Names on the various PCW syndicates involved and to reinsure their liabilities into a new syndicate, number 9001, in turn reinsured by a unique vehicle named Lioncover, which was set up as a Lloyd's subsidiary insurance company. Lioncover assumed the liabilities of PCW as well as the associated WMD and Richard Beckett underwriting agencies in 1987. In 1988 it also assumed the 1967–1969 liabilities of syndicates 2 and 49. Dixon and Cameron-Webb remained at large in the US; Cameron-Webb reportedly died in 2004 in a nursing home in California and Dixon became a real estate agent in Florida; he died in 2017.

Lioncover's PCW liabilities were reinsured as part of the Equitas arrangement in the late 1990s and transferred to National Indemnity Company in two stages in 2007 and 2009. Residual funds in Lioncover were later distributed to surviving PCW Names or donated to the Lloyd's Charities Trust. Lioncover was voluntarily dissolved in 2014.

==== Warrilow syndicate and Centrewrite ====
Lloyd's also faced action from Names on C. J. Warrilow's syndicate 553, which had chronically exceeded its underwriting capacity in the early 1980s and failed to adequately reinsure the huge quantity of risks it was taking on. The solution was to create a new company in 1990 into which these liabilities could be reinsured in order to relieve the Warrilow Names. This entity was named Centrewrite Ltd and in 1993 it assumed Warrilow's 1985 and prior years' liabilities, separately also offering "estate protection plans" (EPPs) for resigned Names. Tens of thousands of Lloyd's Names bought these reinsurance policies.

Centrewrite still exists today but has not written any EPPs since 2011 and conducts little other business; its most recent transaction was in 2013 when it assumed the 2001 liabilities of the life syndicate 1171. It also reinsured the 1997–1999 years of Crowe syndicate 1204 and the 1999–2001 years of Cotesworth syndicate 535. In 2012 the Crowe and Cotesworth liabilities (then valued at just over £17m) were novated to Riverstone (a Fairfax company) meaning minimal liabilities remain in Centrewrite today.

In 1986, the year Lloyd's moved into a new building at 1 Lime Street (where it remains today), the British government commissioned Sir Patrick Neill to report on the standard of investor protection available at Lloyd's. His report was produced in 1987 and made a large number of recommendations, but was never implemented in full.

=== Late 1980s: Piper Alpha and the LMX spiral ===
It has long been normal for one Lloyd's syndicate to reinsure another, but when Piper Alpha, a North Sea oil rig, exploded on 6 July 1988 causing an initial $1.4bn loss, the practice had become so widespread that the underwriters in Lime Street initially had no idea how extensive their exposure was: the loss was passed around in what became known as the London market excess of loss (LMX) "spiral" and claim values escalated out of control.

The rig's operator, Occidental Petroleum, bought a direct insurance policy from Lloyd's underwriters, who then passed part of their shares of the risk on to other syndicates via reinsurance. Those reinsurers then in turn reinsured part of the risk out to other reinsurance underwriters within Lloyd's (known as "retrocessionaires"), and so on. Consequently, many syndicates, especially those writing a large amount of excess of loss reinsurance, became exposed to the same claim multiple times through multiple layers in the spiral. Other catastrophes, including Hurricane Hugo and the Exxon Valdez oil spill in 1989, also went into the spiral.

Some of the leading LMX reinsurers at the time that suffered serious spiral losses included the numerous syndicates managed by the Gooda Walker agency, Devonshire syndicate 216, Rose Thomson Young 255, R. J. Bromley 475, and Patrick Fagan's already challenged Feltrim syndicates 540 and 542. Gooda Walker syndicate 298 became the first fatal casualty, with 13,500 policies being exposed to the Piper Alpha disaster alone and its 1989 account producing a 650 per cent loss on capacity; Feltrim followed with a 550 per cent loss on capacity. Roy Bromley, underwriter of syndicate 475, later committed suicide after being dismissed by his Board and reportedly becoming distressed at his operation's mounting losses.

Not all excess of loss writers succumbed to the LMX spiral; in fact the spiral was relatively confined to a minority of such syndicates. Among the prominent reinsurers that remained profitable throughout the spiral were C. F. Palmer syndicate 314, M. H. Cockell 269/570 and D. P. Mann 435, while G. S. Christensen 958 reported only a slight loss in 1989 but healthy profits in 1990 and 1991.

=== 1990s: Fallout of the asbestosis affair ===
==== Emergence of claims ====
The early to mid-1990s saw the continuation of Lloyd's most traumatic period in its history that had begun with the explosion on Piper Alpha. Unexpectedly large legal awards in US courts for punitive damages led to substantial claims on asbestos, pollution and health hazard (APH) policies, some dating as far back as the 1940s. Many of these policies were open-peril policies, meaning that they covered any claim not specifically excluded. Other policies (called standard, or broad) only cover stated perils, such as fire.

The classic example of "long-tail" insurance risks is asbestosis/mesothelioma claims under employers' liability or workers' compensation policies. An employee at an industrial plant may have been exposed to asbestos in the 1960s, fallen ill 20 years later and claimed compensation from his former employer in the 1990s. The employer would report a claim to the insurance company that wrote the policy in the 1960s. However, because the insurer did not fully understand the nature of the future risk back in the 1960s, it and its reinsurers would not have properly priced or reserved for it. In the case of Lloyd's, this resulted in the bankruptcy of thousands of individual investors who indemnified general liability policies written from the 1940s to the mid-1970s for companies with exposure to asbestosis claims. A group of Names mounted a legal case as the Names Against Lloyd's of London, where they attempted to prove fraud among those brokers who had involved them in the underwriting syndicates.

==== Reinsurance to close ====
It may not be immediately clear how current members of current Lloyd's syndicates, which accept business one year at a time, could be liable to pay historical claims. This came about as a result of the Lloyd's accounting practice known as reinsurance to close (RITC).

A member "joined" a syndicate for one calendar year only, known as the "annual venture". At the end of the year, the syndicate as an ongoing trading entity was effectively disbanded. However, usually the syndicate re-formed for the next calendar year with the same identifying number and more or less the same membership. Since claims can take time to be reported and then paid, the profit or loss for each syndicate took time to realise. The practice at Lloyd's was to wait three years (that is, 36 months from the beginning of the year in which the business was written) before "closing" the year for accounting purposes and declaring a result.

To calculate the profit or loss, reserves were set aside for future claims payments, for claims that had already been notified but not yet paid, as well as estimated amounts for claims that had been incurred but not reported (IBNR). This estimation is difficult and can be inaccurate; in particular, long-tail liability policies tend to produce claims long after the policies are written.

The reserve for future claims liabilities was set aside in an unusual way. The syndicate bought a RITC policy to pay any future claims; the premium was equal to the amount of the reserve. This transaction allowed the year to be closed, and the syndicate's profit or loss declared. The reinsurer was always another Lloyd's syndicate(s), often the succeeding year of the same syndicate: the members of syndicate '1' in 1985 reinsured the future claim liabilities for members of syndicate '1' in 1984. The membership might be the same, or it might have changed.

In this manner, liability for past losses could be transferred year after year until it reached the current syndicate. A member joining a syndicate with a long history of such transactions could – and often did – pick up liability for losses on policies written decades previously. As long as the reserves had been accurately estimated, and the appropriate RITC premium paid every year, then all would have been well, but in many cases this had not been possible: no-one could have predicted the surge in APH losses. Therefore, the amounts of money transferred from earlier years by successive RITC premiums to cover these losses were grossly insufficient, and the current members had to pay the shortfall.

As a result, a great many Names whose syndicates wrote long-tail liability at Lloyd's faced significant financial loss or ruin by the late 1980s to mid-1990s.

==== Dilution of liabilities and the consequences ====
It was alleged that in the early 1980s some Lloyd's officials began a recruitment programme to enroll new Names to help capitalise Lloyd's prior to the expected onslaught of APH claims. This allegation became known as "recruit to dilute": in other words, recruit more Names to dilute the losses. When the huge extent of asbestosis losses came to light in the early 1990s, for the first time in Lloyd's history large numbers of members either were unable to pay the claims or refused, many alleging that they were the victims of fraud, misrepresentation, and/or negligence. The opaque system of accounting at Lloyd's made it difficult, if not impossible, for many Names to understand the extent of the liability that they personally and their syndicates had subscribed to.

Also, numerous underwriters of long-tail non-marine business, concerned at their exposures to the impending asbestosis crisis, had sought to reinsure their liabilities with other carriers. Approximately 20 syndicates, including Lloyd's deputy chairman Murray Lawrence's, paid millions of pounds in premiums to Richard H. M. Outhwaite, then considered a highly capable marine underwriter, to assume approximately 80 per cent of the market's asbestos exposure on his well-supported syndicates 317/661 in 1982. In 1985, under Lloyd's three-year accounting rule, auditors kept Outhwaite's 1982 year open, citing concerns over asbestos and pollution liability losses. These eventually ran into the hundreds of millions of dollars. After many years of litigation, Outhwaite retired to Guernsey and died on 20 November 2021.

Another asbestosis-hit operation, Pulbrook syndicates 90/334, had taken out reinsurance in 1981 on its general liability business with Merrett syndicate 418; however, in 1990 Stephen Merrett (who by now controlled Pulbrook) won an arbitration ruling to void that arrangement due to non-disclosure of the extent of asbestos exposure, leaving the Pulbrook Names without cover for their losses of £100,000 each on average. Even earlier, in 1974, the underwriter of R. W. Sturge syndicate 210, Ralph Rokeby-Johnson, who specialised in American industrial risks, bought "stop-loss" reinsurance from Fireman's Fund and Kemper Insurance in the US on Sturge's pre-1969 exposures that were accumulating into the present. This contract developed so poorly that Fireman's Fund later sought its own stop-loss cover for the losses assumed from Sturge. Rokeby-Johnson later prompted Lloyd's to create a working party on asbestosis.

==== Reconstruction and Renewal ====
During the mid-1990s the market was forced to restructure. Under the chairmanship of Sir David Rowland and chief executive Peter Middleton, an ambitious plan entitled "Reconstruction and Renewal" (R&R) was produced in 1995, with proposals for separating the ongoing Lloyd's from its past losses. Liabilities for all pre-1993 business (other than life assurance) were to be compulsorily transferred (by RITC) into a special vehicle named Equitas (which would require the approval of the UK's Department of Trade and Industry) at a cost of around $21bn.

Many Names faced large bills, but the plan also provided for a settlement of their disputes, a tax on recent profits, and the write-off of nearly $5bn owed in the form of "debt credits", skewed towards those with the worst losses. The plan was debated at length, modified, and eventually strongly supported by the Association of Lloyd's Members (ALM) and most leaders of Names' action groups. New CEO Ron Sandler was instrumental in its implementation. Money was raised in many ways, including the sale and leaseback of the Lloyd's building, and a tax on future business. Individual offers of settlement were accepted by 95 per cent of Names. The past liabilities on the 1992 and prior years were transferred to Equitas in September 1996, including those under Lioncover and Centrewrite.

The "recruit to dilute" fraud allegations were heard in an eight-month trial in 2000 in the case Jaffray v. Society of Lloyd's and were rejected by the judge; an appeal was heard in 2002 and unanimously rejected. On each occasion the allegation that there had been a policy to recruit to dilute was dismissed and Names were urged to settle; however, at first instance the judge described the Names as "the innocent victims [...] of staggering incompetence" and the appeal court found that representations that Lloyd's had a rigorous auditing system were false and strongly hinted that one of Lloyd's main witnesses, former chairman Murray Lawrence, had lied in his testimony.

Lloyd's then instituted some major structural changes: corporate members with limited liability were permitted to join and underwrite insurance; no new unlimited-liability Names were allowed to join (although a few hundred existing ones remained); financial requirements for underwriting were changed, to prevent excess underwriting that was not backed by liquid assets; and market oversight significantly increased. Lloyd's rebounded and started to thrive again after the catastrophic losses arising out of the World Trade Center attack, but it faced increased competition from newly created companies in Bermuda and other markets.

In 2006 the Berkshire Hathaway subsidiary National Indemnity Company (NICO) agreed to assume all of Equitas' assets and liabilities, providing $7bn of new reinsurance cover for future claims payments in addition to the $8.7bn of existing reserves within Equitas. The transfer (in two phases between 2007 and 2009) represented "finality" under English law for all affected Names, who now faced "no further liability whatsoever" to the pre-1993 losses.

=== 2019–present: Modernisation and alternative capital ===
In 2019, Lloyd's launched the Future at Lloyd's programme, a series of initiatives intended to modernise the market and attract new underwriting businesses and sources of capital. One initiative was the "syndicate in a box" (SIAB), a simplified model for establishing smaller syndicates. SIABs were permitted to begin with less than £100 million of gross written premium, subject to restrictions on catastrophe exposures, business mix and operating expenses. Lloyd's received around 80 applications during the first year of the initiative, although the subsequent development of the model was mixed, with some SIABs developing into larger syndicates while the number of new entrants later declined.

A major element of the programme was Blueprint Two, a market-wide digital transformation project intended to replace legacy systems used for insurance placement, accounting and claims. The programme suffered repeated delays and attracted criticism from market participants over its cost and implementation. In 2026, Lloyd's announced that it would transition away from Blueprint Two, stating that technology used by individual market participants had advanced substantially since the programme was conceived and that Lloyd's would instead focus on data standards, interoperability and coordination. The Times reported that the abandoned programme could result in write-offs of up to £300 million.

Lloyd's also sought to broaden the sources of capital supporting its syndicates. In 2021 it established the London Bridge risk-transformation structure, allowing institutional and other third-party investors to provide capital to Lloyd's underwriting through insurance-linked securities structures. By 2024, around $1.9 billion of capital had been channelled through London Bridge, with investors including hedge funds, private equity firms and pension funds. The structure formed part of efforts to increase Lloyd's participation in the global insurance-linked securities market and compete with alternative insurance capital centres such as Bermuda.

In 2020, following the George Floyd protests, Lloyd's issued a statement, apologising "for the role played by the Lloyd's market in the 18th and 19th century slave trade – an appalling and shameful period of English history, as well as our own".

== Structure ==
Lloyd's is a market of members, not an insurance company. As the oldest continuously active insurance marketplace in the world, Lloyd's has retained some unusual structures and practices that differ from other insurance providers today. Originally created as a non-incorporated association of subscribing members, it was incorporated by the Lloyd's Act 1871 and is currently governed under the Lloyd's Acts of 1871 through to 1982.

Lloyd's does not underwrite insurance business itself – its members do. The Society effectively acts as a market regulator, setting rules under which members operate and offering centralised administrative services to them.

=== Council of Lloyd's ===
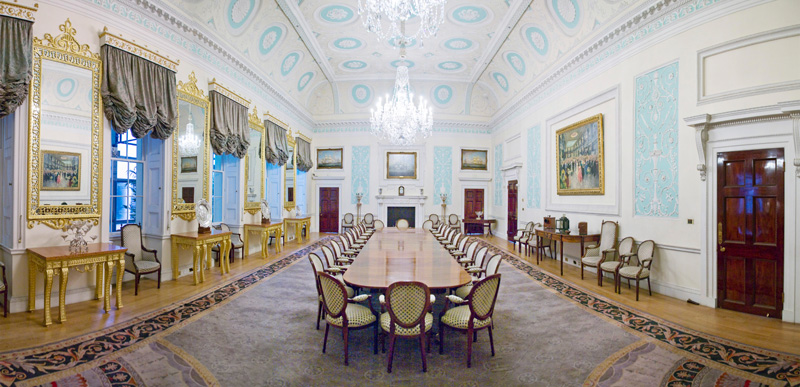
The Council meets in the Committee Room, on the 11th floor of the Lloyd's building.

The Lloyd's Act 1982 defines the management structure and rules under which the market operates. Under the Act, the Council of Lloyd's is responsible for the management and supervision of the market. It is regulated by the Prudential Regulation Authority and the Financial Conduct Authority.

The Council normally has six working, six external and six nominated members. The appointment of nominated members, including that of the chief executive officer, is confirmed by the Governor of the Bank of England. The working and external members are elected by Lloyd's members. The chairman and deputy chairmen are elected annually by the Council from among the working members of the Council. All members are approved by the regulating bodies.

The Council can discharge some of its functions directly by making decisions and issuing resolutions, requirements, rules and bylaws. The Council delegates most of its daily oversight roles, particularly relating to ensuring the market operates successfully, to the Franchise Board.

The Franchise Board lays down guidelines for all syndicates and operates a business planning and monitoring process to safeguard high standards of underwriting and risk management, thereby improving sustainable profitability and enhancing the financial strength of the market. The Board is chaired by the chairman of Lloyd's and has three executive members, three non-executives connected to the market and five independent non-executives.

==== Chair of Lloyd's ====
The following is a list of the chair of Lloyd's since 1979:

- 1979–1983: Sir Peter Green
- 1984–1987: Sir Peter Miller
- 1988–1990: Murray Lawrence
- 1991–1992: David Coleridge
- 1993–1997: Sir David Rowland
- 1998–2000: Max Taylor
- 2001–2002: Sax Riley
- 2003–2011: Lord Levene
- 2011–2017: John Nelson
- 2017–2025: Bruce Carnegie-Brown
- 2025–present: Sir Charles Roxburgh

==== Chief executives of Lloyd's ====
The following is a list of the chief executive officers of Lloyd's since the role was created in 1983:

- 1983–1985: Ian Hay Davison
- 1985–1992: Alan Lord
- 1992–1995: Peter Middleton
- 1995–1999: Ron Sandler
- 1999–2006: Nick Prettejohn
- 2006–2013: Richard Ward
- 2013–2018: Inga Beale
- 2018–2025: John Neal
- 2025–present: Patrick Tiernan

=== Businesses at Lloyd's ===
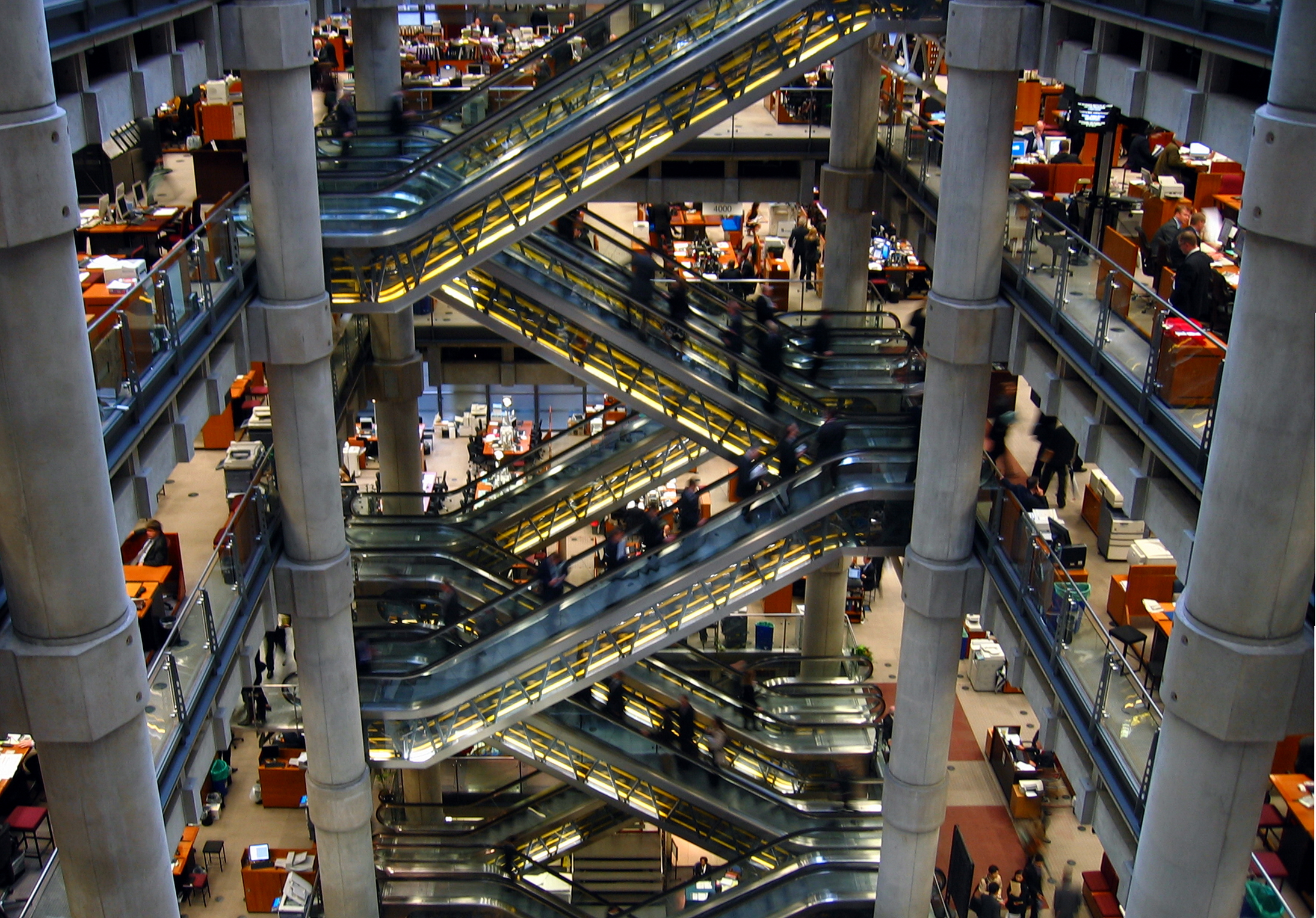
Interior escalators linking the underwriting floors of the Lloyd's building

There are two classes of people and firms active at Lloyd's. The first are members, or providers of capital. The second are agents, brokers, and other professionals who support the members, underwrite the risks and represent outside customers (for example, individuals and companies seeking insurance, or insurance companies seeking reinsurance).

==== Members ====
For most of Lloyd's history, rich individuals known as Names backed policies written at Lloyd's with all of their personal wealth and took on unlimited liability. Since 1994, Lloyd's has allowed corporate members into the market, with limited liability. The asbestosis losses in the early 1990s devastated the finances of many Names: upwards of 1,500 out of 34,000 Names (4.4 per cent) were declared bankrupt. This scared away other potential Names. In 2011 individual Names provide only 11 per cent of capacity at Lloyd's, with UK-listed and other corporate members providing 30 per cent and the remainder via the international insurance industry.

No new Names with unlimited liability are admitted, and the importance of individual Names will continue to decline as they slowly withdraw, convert (generally into limited liability partnerships), or die. In 2014, Names with unlimited liability provided just 2 per cent of the overall capacity in Lloyd's.

==== Managing agents ====
Managing agents sponsor and manage syndicates. They canvas members for commitments of capacity, create the syndicate, hire underwriters, and oversee all of the syndicate's activities. Managing agents may run more than one syndicate, as borne out in the fact that in 2023 the 78 syndicates writing business at Lloyd's were operated by just 51 managing agents.

==== Members' agents ====
Members' agents co-ordinate the members' underwriting and act as a buffer between Lloyd's, the managing agents and the members. They were introduced in the mid-1970s and grew in number until many went bust; many of the businesses merged, and there are now only four left (Argenta, Hampden, Alpha and LMAS, which has no active Names). It is mandatory that unlimited Names write through a members' agent, and many limited liability members also choose to do so.

==== Lloyd's coverholder ====
Coverholders are a major source of business for Lloyd's. Their numbers have grown steadily in recent years and in 2021 there were 4,054, producing an increasingly meaningful share of the market's overall premium income. The balance of Lloyd's business is distributed around the world through a network of brokers.

Coverholders allow Lloyd's syndicates to operate in a region or country as if they were a local insurer. This is achieved by Lloyd's syndicates delegating their underwriting authority to coverholders. A coverholder can have restricted or full authority to underwrite specified business on behalf of a Lloyd's syndicate. It will usually issue the insurance documentation and will often also handle claims. The document setting out the terms of the coverholder's delegated authority is known as a binding authority.

==== Lloyd's brokers ====
Outsiders, whether individuals or other insurance companies, cannot transact business directly with Lloyd's syndicates. They must hire an approved Lloyd's broker, who are the only customer-facing organisations at Lloyd's. They are therefore often referred to as intermediaries. Lloyd's brokers shop customers' risks around the syndicates, trying to obtain the best coverage and most competitive terms.

==== Integrated Lloyd's vehicles ====
When corporations became admitted as Lloyd's members, they often disliked the traditional structure. Insurance companies did not want to rely on the underwriting skills of syndicates they did not control, so they started their own. An integrated Lloyd's vehicle (ILV) is a group of companies that combines a corporate member, a managing agent, and a syndicate under common ownership. Some ILVs allow minority contributions from other members, but most now try to operate on an exclusive basis.

=== Financial security ===
Lloyd's capital structure, often referred to as the "chain of security", provides financial security to policyholders and capital efficiency to members. The Corporation is responsible for setting both member and central capital levels to achieve a level of capitalisation that is robust and allows members the potential to earn superior returns.

There are three "links" in the chain: the funds in the first and second links are held in trust, primarily for the benefit of insureds whose policies are underwritten by the relevant member. Members underwrite for their own account and are not liable for other members' losses (i.e. liabilities are several, not joint).

The third link consists largely of the Lloyd's Central Fund, which contains mutual assets held by the Corporation which are available, subject to Council approval as required, to meet any member's liabilities. As well as the Central Fund, the third link contains Corporation assets, subordinated debt, and a "callable layer" which can be invoked should the final link require topping up.

== Financial performance ==
Each Lloyd's syndicate is responsible for determining how much money to hold in reserve for its known liabilities and its estimated unknown liabilities, and each may choose to release some of its reserves for prior-year claims if it (and its independent auditors) deems it appropriate. Conversely, reserves may need to be strengthened if prior-year loss estimates deteriorate. Overall reserve releases can improve the syndicate's "accident year" combined ratio (the sum of the loss ratio and the expense ratio), whereas overall reserve increases can worsen the accident year combined ratio. The combined ratio after these reserve movements is known as the "calendar year" result.

=== Historical results ===
Lloyd's worst results in its long history were in the 1989 through 1991 years, each producing overall losses of over £2bn; the late 1990s were also punctuated by repeated and significant underwriting losses. In 2001 the calendar year result was a 140 per cent combined ratio, driven largely by claims arising out of the World Trade Center attack, reserve increases for prior-year liabilities and deteriorating pricing levels. However, the market subsequently enjoyed profitability in most years except those marked by unusual levels of large natural catastrophes. For example, the 2005 Atlantic hurricane season (which included Hurricane Katrina) drove the Lloyd's overall combined ratio to 112 per cent, while the 2017 Atlantic hurricanes coupled with destructive wildfires in California caused the Lloyd's market to report a 114 per cent combined ratio result in that year.

=== Recent results ===
In its most recent annual report, for 2023, Lloyd's reported an underwriting profit of £5.91bn, plus a £4.75bn gain on investments to produce an overall pre-tax profit of £10.66bn, compared to a pre-tax loss of £769m in 2022. The 2023 calendar-year combined ratio was 84 per cent, which was Lloyd's best result since 2007. Gross premiums written totalled £52.1bn, which was an increase from £46.7bn in 2022, without taking exchange-rate fluctuations into account. Major losses in 2023 were considerably fewer than the previous year, which was marred by Hurricane Ian.

The following table details some key financial metrics for the Lloyd's market for the past 10 years, as reported in each year's annual report:

Year	Gross premiums written	Combined ratio (AY)	Combined ratio (CY)	Pre-tax profit/(loss)	Pre-tax ROC	Ref
2023	£52,149m	86.2%	84.0%	£10,663m	25.3%	
2022	£46,705m	95.5%	91.9%	(£769m)	(2.0)%	
2021	£39,216m	95.6%	93.5%	£2,277m	6.6%	
2020	£35,466m	112.1%	110.3%	(£887m)	(2.8%)	
2019	£35,905m	103.0%	102.1%	£2,532m	8.8%	
2018	£35,527m	108.4%	104.5%	(£1,001m)	(3.7%)	
2017	£33,591m	116.9%	114.0%	(£2,001m)	(7.3%)	
2016	£29,862m	103.0%	97.9%	£2,107m	8.1%	
2015	£26,690m	97.9%	90.0%	£2,122m	9.1%	
2014	£25,283m	96.1%	88.1%	£3,161m	14.7%	

== Timeline of significant events at Lloyd's ==
- 1686 Earliest reference to Edward Lloyd's coffee house on Tower Street
- 1691 Coffee house relocated to Lombard Street
- 1774 Society of Lloyd's founded at the Royal Exchange
- 1783 Zong massacre trial
- 1799 Sinking of HMS Lutine
- 1871 Lloyd's Act
- 1906 San Francisco earthquake
- 1909 Sinking of RMS Republic
- 1911 Lloyd's Act
- 1912 Sinking of RMS Titanic
- 1914 Sinking of RMS Empress of Ireland
- 1925 Market relocated to its first owned building, at 12 Leadenhall Street
- 1955 Supported the Montgomery bus boycott by insuring the civil rights volunteers' carpool fleet after local insurers refused to
- 1956 Sinking of SS Andrea Doria
- 1958 Market relocated to new owned building, at 51 Lime Street
- 1965 Hurricane Betsy
- 1968 Cromer report published
- 1977 F. H. "Tim" Sasse syndicate scandal
- 1978 Amoco Cadiz disaster
- 1977 Computer leasing losses emerged
- 1979 Betelgeuse incident; Three Mile Island accident
- 1980 Asbestos Working Party created to monitor the increasing losses from asbestos injury
- 1982 Accountants Neville Russell warned that assessing the losses from asbestos injury was "an impossibility"
- 1982 Lloyd's Act
- 1986 Market relocated to the current Lloyd's building, at 1 Lime Street
- 1988 Piper Alpha disaster
- 1989 Exxon Valdez oil spill; Hurricane Hugo; Loma Prieta earthquake
- 1989 Lloyd's Community Programme founded, with first chairman Michael Wade
- 1990s Escalation of the asbestosis affair and London market excess of loss (LMX) spiral
- 1991 Typhoon Mireille
- 1992 Hurricane Andrew
- 1993 Bishopsgate bombing and subsequent establishment of Pool Re
- 1994 Northridge earthquake
- 1994 Hardship Scheme set up to help Names whose losses exceeded their assets
- 1996 Equitas set up to harbour all pre-1993 exposures
- 2000 A group of Names led by Sir William Jaffray issue court proceedings alleging fraud
- 2001 World Trade Center attack
- 2004 Hurricanes Charley, Frances, Ivan and Jeanne
- 2005 Hurricanes Katrina, Rita and Wilma
- 2006 Berkshire Hathaway assumed Equitas liabilities
- 2010 Deepwater Horizon disaster
- 2011 Tōhoku earthquake and tsunami
- 2013 Inga Beale appointed first female chief executive officer of Lloyd's
- 2017 Hurricanes Harvey, Irma and Maria and California wildfires
- 2020 COVID-19 pandemic resulted in the first ever temporary closure of Lloyd's building
- 2022 Hurricane Ian and losses arising out of the Russian invasion of Ukraine
- 2024 Baltimore Key Bridge collapse

== Types of policies ==
Lloyd's syndicates provides direct insurance and reinsurance across sectors such as property, casualty, marine, energy, motor and aviation. Lloyd's also covers specialist risks, including kidnap and ransom, fine art, specie, aviation, war, satellites, personal accident, and bloodstock.

Lloyd's is famous for writing policies to cover famous, unusual, or bizarre events. For example, Lloyd's has insured:

Groups

- A comedy theatre group against the risk of a member of their audience dying of laughter

Inanimate objects

- Participating automobiles in the carpools involved in the Montgomery bus boycott
- A grain of rice with a portrait of Queen Elizabeth II and Prince Philip, Duke of Edinburgh engraved on it for $20,000
- The development of the new World Trade Center with workers' compensation, general liability, excess liability and speciality insurance programmes

People

- The bodies of several professional wrestlers, including Brian Adams, Ric Flair, Bret Hart, Curt Hennig, Joe Laurinaitis (better known as Road Warrior Animal) and Rick Rude. However, as of 2017, Dave Meltzer reported that they no longer insure wrestlers.
- Toni Braxton's, Celine Dion's, Bob Dylan's, Whitney Houston's, and Bruce Springsteen's vocal cords
- Marlene Dietrich's, Betty Grable's, Brooke Shields's, Tina Turner's and Mary Hart's legs
- Ken Dodd's teeth for $7.4m
- Michael Flatley's legs for $47m (the policy was only in effect when he was touring, and forbade him from dancing except on stage)
- Cricketer Merv Hughes' trademark walrus mustache while playing for Australia between 1985 and 1994
- Keiran Lee's penis for $1m
- The hands of the 1932 World Yo-Yo Champion Harvey Lowe
- Troy Polamalu's hair for $1m
- Food critic and gourmet Egon Ronay's taste buds for £250,000
- Pat McAfee's legs during his franchise tag season with the Indianapolis Colts
- Will Smith's stunt bungee jumping out of a helicopter into the Grand Canyon on his 50th birthday, for $200m

== Miscellaneous ==
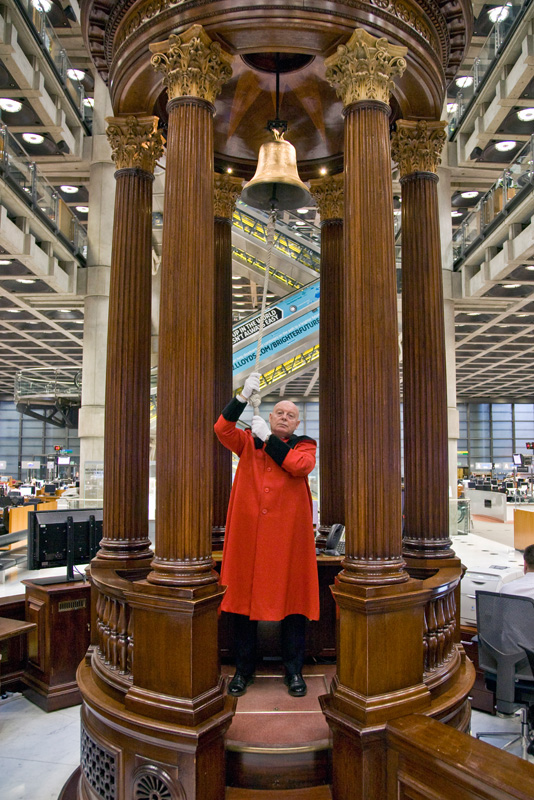
The Lutine bell, housed in the rostrum in the main Underwriting Room

The present Lloyd's building, at 1 Lime Street, was designed by architect Richard Rogers and was completed in 1986. It stands on the site of the old Roman Forum. The 1925 building's facade survives, appearing strangely stranded with the modern building visible through the gates on the northern side on Leadenhall Street. In 2011 it became a listed building.

In the main Underwriting Room of Lloyd's stands the Lutine bell, salvaged in 1858, which was rung when the fate of a ship "overdue" at its destination port became known. If the ship was safe, the bell would be rung twice; if it had sunk, the bell would be rung once. (This had the practical purpose of immediately stopping the sale or purchase of "overdue" reinsurance on that vessel.) Nowadays it is only rung for ceremonial purposes, such as the visit of a distinguished guest, or for the annual Remembrance Day service and anniversaries of major world events.

Brokers and underwriters are still normally held to, and apparently prefer, a more formal style of attire than many nearby City of London banks and financial institutions.

=== Arms ===
Coat of arms of Lloyd's of London
Crest Upon waves of the sea a representation of H.M.S. La Lutine, 32-gun frigate, in full sail, all proper. Escutcheon Per fesse Argent and Azure, in chief a Cross within the dexter canton a sword erect Gules, and in base a fouled anchor in bend sinister Or. Supporters A Sea Lion, proper, the head and mane Or, supporting a Trident erect, also proper. Motto Fidentia

== See also ==
- Jonathan's Coffee-House – original home of the London Stock Exchange
- Lloyd's List
- Lloyd's Open Form
- Lloyd's unlimited rating
