= INSIG (insurance company) =

- Company type: Insurance company
- Industry: Financial services
- Founded: 31 July 1991
- Headquarters: Tirana, Albania
- Area served: Albania, Kosovo, North Macedonia
- Key people: Kadri Morinaj (CEO)
- Products: Life and general insurance
- Website: insig.com.al

Insurance Institute (INSIG SH.A.) is an Albanian insurance company. Established in 1991 as a government-owned monopoly, it was the first insurance company to operate in Albania and it has played a defining role in the creation, development and consolidation of this business in the country's economy.

INSIG carries out its activities mainly in the field of insurance by the offering of life and general insurance products and services. The company has expanded its operations outside the territory of Albania by opening new subsidiaries in neighbouring Kosovo and North Macedonia.

== History ==
INSIG's monopoly ended in 1999 when the Albanian insurance market opened to private companies, leading to a gradual decline in its market share.

In December 2008, the Albanian government announced plans to sell 61% of INSIG to American Reserve Life Insurance for €25 million, with minority stakes held by the International Finance Corporation (IFC) and the European Bank for Reconstruction and Development (EBRD). However, this sale was ultimately not finalised.

Eurosig bought both the life and non-life insurance businesses of INSIG from Albania's government for 2.2 billion leks ($17.9 million/16.3 million euro) in May 2016.

In May 2016, the Albanian Government sold the life and general insurance business of INSIG for 2.2 billion leks (US$17.9 million, or 16.3 million euros).
