= Chain-ladder method =

Loss reserving method in actuarial science

The chain-ladder or development method is a prominent actuarial loss reserving technique. The chain-ladder method is used in both the property and casualty and health insurance fields. Its intent is to estimate incurred but not reported claims and project ultimate loss amounts. The primary underlying assumption of the chain-ladder method is that historical loss development patterns are indicative of future loss development patterns.

== Methodology ==
According to Jacqueline Friedland's "Estimating Unpaid Claims Using Basic Techniques," there are seven steps to apply the chain-ladder technique:

1. Compile claims data in a development triangle
2. Calculate age-to-age factors
3. Calculate averages of the age-to-age factors
4. Select claim development factors
5. Select tail factor
6. Calculate cumulative claim development factors
7. Project ultimate claims

Age-to-age factors, also called loss development factors (LDFs) or link ratios, represent the ratio of loss amounts from one valuation date to another, and they are intended to capture growth patterns of losses over time. These factors are used to project where the ultimate amount losses will settle.

== Example ==
Firstly, losses (either reported or paid) are compiled into a triangle, where the rows represent accident years and the columns represent valuation dates. For example, the entry '43,169,009' represents loss amounts related to claims occurring in 1998, valued as of 24 months.

Reported claims
Valuation date Accident year	12	24	36	48	60	72	84	96	108	120
1998	37,017,487	43,169,009	45,568,919	46,784,558	47,337,318	47,533,264	47,634,419	47,689,655	47,724,678	47,742,304
1999	38,954,484	46,045,718	48,882,924	50,219,672	50,729,292	50,926,779	51,069,285	51,163,540	51,185,767	
2000	41,155,776	49,371,478	52,358,476	53,780,322	54,303,086	54,582,950	54,742,188	54,837,929		
2001	42,394,069	50,584,112	53,704,296	55,150,118	55,895,583	56,156,727	56,299,562			
2002	44,755,243	52,971,643	56,102,312	57,703,851	58,363,564	58,592,712				
2003	45,163,102	52,497,731	55,468,551	57,015,411	57,565,344					
2004	45,417,309	52,640,322	55,553,673	56,976,657						
2005	46,360,869	53,790,061	56,786,410							
2006	46,582,684	54,641,339								
2007	48,853,563									

Next, age-to-age factors are determined by calculating the ratio of losses at subsequent valuation dates. From 24 months to 36 months, accident year 1998 losses increased from 43,169,009 to 45,568,919, so the corresponding age-to-age factor is 45,568,919 / 43,169,009 = 1.056. A "tail factor" is selected (in this case, 1.000) to project from the latest valuation age to ultimate.

Age-to-age factors
Accident year	12-24	24-36	36-48	48-60	60-72	72-84	84-96	96-108	108-120	To ult
1998	1.166	1.056	1.027	1.012	1.004	1.002	1.001	1.001	1.000	
1999	1.182	1.062	1.027	1.010	1.004	1.003	1.002	1.000		
2000	1.200	1.061	1.027	1.010	1.005	1.003	1.002			
2001	1.193	1.062	1.027	1.014	1.005	1.003				
2002	1.184	1.059	1.029	1.011	1.004					
2003	1.162	1.057	1.028	1.010						
2004	1.159	1.055	1.026							
2005	1.160	1.056								
2006	1.173									
2007										

Finally, averages of the age-to-age factors are calculated. Judgmental selections are made after observing several averages. The selected age-to-age factors are then multiplied together to obtain cumulative development factors.

Averages
Month range Averaging method	12-24	24-36	36-48	48-60	60-72	72-84	84-96	96-108	108-120	To ult
Simple average last 5 years	1.168	1.058	1.027	1.011	1.004	1.003	1.002	1.001	1.000	
Simple average last 3 years	1.164	1.056	1.027	1.012	1.005	1.003	1.002	1.001	1.000	
Volume weighted last 5 years	1.168	1.058	1.027	1.011	1.004	1.003	1.002	1.001	1.000	
Volume weighted last 3 years	1.164	1.056	1.027	1.012	1.005	1.003	1.002	1.001	1.000	
Selected	1.164	1.056	1.027	1.012	1.005	1.003	1.002	1.001	1.000	1.000
Cumulative to ultimate	1.292	1.110	1.051	1.023	1.011	1.006	1.003	1.001	1.000	1.000

The cumulative development factors multiplied by the reported (or paid) losses to project ultimate losses.

Estimation of ultimate claims
Accident year	Reported claims	Development factor to ultimate	Projected ultimate claims
1998	47,742,304	1.000	47,742,304
1999	51,185,767	1.000	51,185,767
2000	54,837,929	1.001	54,892,767
2001	56,299,562	1.003	56,468,461
2002	58,592,712	1.006	58,944,268
2003	57,565,344	1.011	58,198,563
2004	56,976,657	1.023	58,287,120
2005	56,786,410	1.051	59,682,517
2006	54,641,339	1.110	60,651,886
2007	48,853,563	1.292	63,118,803
Total	543,481,587		569,172,456

Incurred but not reported can be obtained by subtracting reported losses from ultimate losses, in this case, 569,172,456 - 543,481,587 = 25,690,869.

== Limitations ==
The chain-ladder technique is only accurate when patterns of loss development in the past can be assumed to continue in the future. In contrast to other loss reserving methods such as the Bornhuetter–Ferguson method, it relies only on past experience to arrive at an incurred but not reported claims estimate.

When there are changes to an insurer's operations, such as a change in claims settlement times, changes in claims staffing, or changes to case reserve practices, the chain-ladder method will not produce an accurate estimate without adjustments.

The chain-ladder method is also very responsive to changes in experience, and as a result, it may be unsuitable for very volatile lines of business.

== See also ==
- Incurred but not reported
- Loss reserving
- Bornhuetter–Ferguson method
