= Loss development factor =

Loss development factors or LDFs are used in insurance pricing and reserving to adjust claims to their projected ultimate level. Insurance claims, especially in long-tailed lines such as liability insurance, are often not paid out immediately. Claims adjusters set initial case reserves for claims; however, it is often impossible to predict immediately what the final amount of an insurance claim will be, due to uncertainty around defense costs, settlement amounts, and trial outcomes (in addition to several other factors). Loss development factors are used by actuaries, underwriters, and other insurance professionals to "develop" claim amounts to their estimated final value. Ultimate loss amounts are necessary for determining an insurance company's carried reserves. They are also useful for determining adequate insurance premiums, when loss experience is used as a rating factor

Loss development factors are used in all triangular methods of loss reserving, such as the chain-ladder method.

== See also ==
- Incurred but not reported
