= Odyssey Re =

American insurance company

Odyssey Re Holdings Corp.
- Type: Subsidiary
- Industry: Insurance
- Founded: 1996; 30 years ago
- Headquarters: Stamford, Connecticut, United States
- Area served: Worldwide
- Parent: Fairfax Financial
- Website: www.odysseyre.com

Odyssey Re Holdings Corp., headquartered in Stamford, Connecticut, United States, is an underwriter of property and casualty treaty and facultative reinsurance, as well as specialty insurance. It is a wholly owned subsidiary of Fairfax Financial, a financial services holding company. OdysseyRe operates through four divisions: Americas, EuroAsia, London Market and US Insurance. OdysseyRe offers a range of property, casualty, surety and credit, marine and energy, aviation and space reinsurance products from offices around the world.

For the year ended on December 31, 2010, reinsurance represented 65.0% of gross premiums written, and primary insurance represented the remaining 35.0%.

Odyssey Re was listed as one of America's 400 Best Big Companies by Forbes in 2008 for the fourth time. The company's support of a Super-PAC in the 2012 United States presidential election has been deemed controversial by some, as interference by a Canadian-owned entity in American domestic politics.
