= Sterling Holiday Resorts Limited =

Travel and holiday companies of India

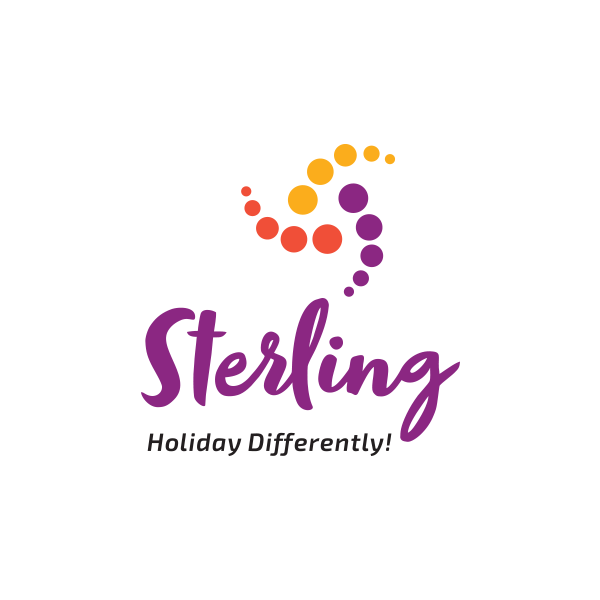
- Type: Public
- Traded as: BSE: 523363
- Industry: Leisure Hospitality, Vacation Ownership, Timeshare, MICE, Corporate Travel and Adventure Holidays
- Founded: 1986
- Founder: R.Subramanian
- Headquarters: Chennai, Tamil Nadu, India
- Key people: Vikram Lalvani (Managing Director and CEO) starting April 2022
- Products: Leisure Travel, Timeshare, Vacation Ownership, MICE, Corporate Travel, Adventure Holidays
- Parent: Sterling Holiday Resorts Limited
- Subsidiaries: Nature Trails Resorts Private Limited
- Website: www.sterlingholidays.com

Sterling Holiday Resorts Limited (known as Sterling) is a leisure hospitality company and subsidiary of Thomas Cook India. As of 2025, it is operating 61 resorts across India.

== History ==
Sterling was established in 1986 in Chennai, India, and opened its first resort, Lake View Kodaikanal (the resort has been later renamed as Sterling Kodai - Lake) in 1988. Sterling expanded to 9 resorts by the year 1995. In 2010, the company changed its brand name from Sterling Resorts to Sterling Holidays. Since 2014, Sterling Holiday Resorts Limited has been a part of Fairfax Financial Holdings Ltd. and is a 100% independently managed subsidiary of Thomas Cook India Limited (TCIL).

The company currently operates 61 resorts in 54 scenic destinations across the country (as of July 2025) and counting.

== Resorts ==
Sterling operates resorts across India in hill, beach, jungle, riverside, and heritage locations.

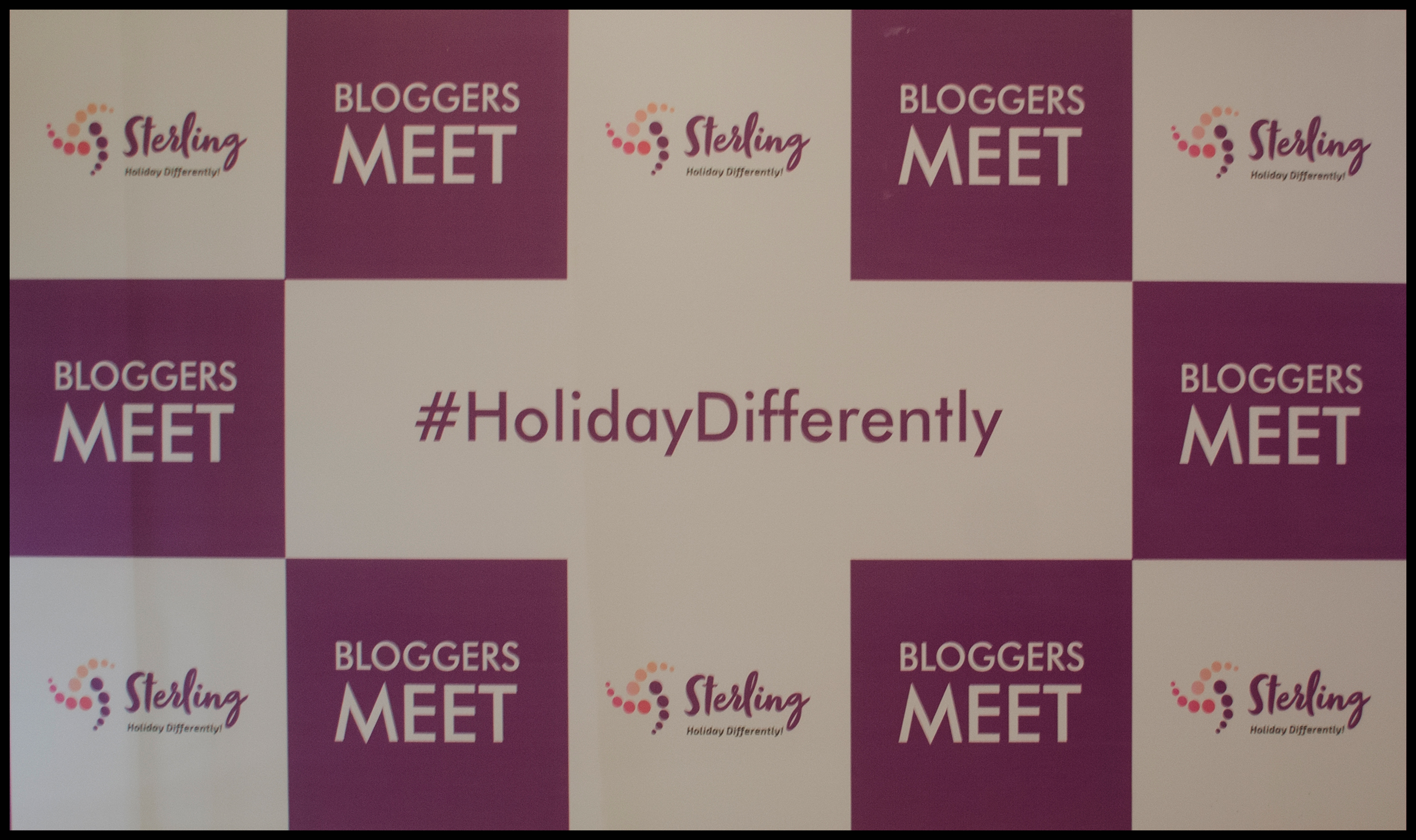
Sterling Resort Logo of bloggers meet in Puri resort

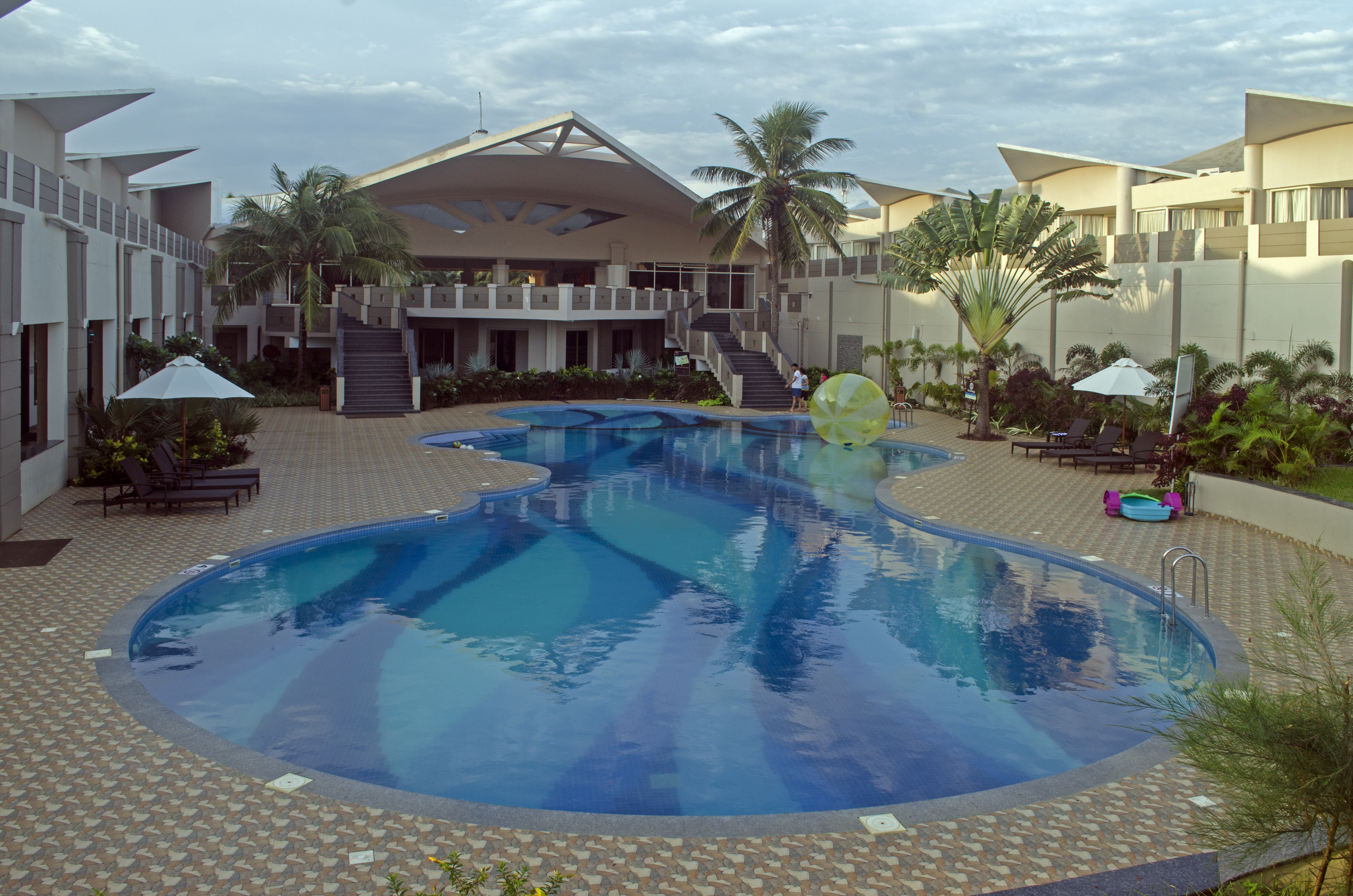
Sterling Resort Puri interiors

== About investors ==
In 2009, Bay Capital (formerly Indus Hospitality Fund) invested in Sterling Holiday Resorts, acquiring an 18.80% stake. Again in 2009, India Discovery Fund acquired a 7% stake in the company. Bay Capital and others (including India Discovery Fund, Damani group and Jhunjhunwala group) held a total stake of 47.42% in Sterling Holiday Resorts through its funds. In July 2011, the company announced an Extraordinary General Meeting on 13 August 2011 to seek shareholder approval to raise Rs. 121.5 crore capital through the issuance of equity shares & warrants on a preferential basis to a consortium of investors led by Rakesh Jhunjhunwala and Radhakrishna Damani. On 7 February 2014, Thomas Cook India Ltd. (TCIL) & Sterling Holiday Resorts Limited announced a merger between the companies.
