= Richard Ward (businessman) =

English executive chairman

Richard Ward (born 1957) joined the Ardonagh Group in September 2018 as executive chairman of speciality. Ardonagh are one of the world's leading independent insurance brokers. Ward is on the board of Direct Line Group as the senior independent non-executive director and chair of the remuneration committee, having joined in January 2016.

Prior to Ardonagh, Ward was executive chairman of Cunningham Lindsey from June 2014. Cunningham Lindsey is a provider of claims management and risk services, with over 7,000 employees in 60 countries.

In addition to Cunningham Lindsey, Ward served as non-executive chairman of Brit Insurance, from 2014 until 2018. Ward also served as a non-executive director of Partnership Assurance Group plc between 2013 and 2016 and was a member of the PRA Practitioner Panel of the Bank of England from 2015 until 2020.

Prior to these roles, Ward was chief executive of Lloyd's of London, from 2006 to 2013.

Ward previously worked for over ten years at the London-based International Petroleum Exchange (IPE), the second largest energy trading exchange, as both chief executive officer and vice-chairman.

Prior to the IPE, Ward held a range of senior positions at BP and was head of marketing and business development for energy derivatives worldwide at Tradition Financial Services.

Between 1982 and 1988, Ward worked as a senior physicist with the Science and Engineering Research Council, leading a number of research development projects.

He is married with two children and lives in London.

== Education ==
He graduated from the University of Exeter with a BSc, 1st Class Hons in chemistry and holds a PhD in physical chemistry.

== Career ==
His initial career was as an applied scientist, first for the government agency Science and Engineering Research Council, at the Rutherford Appleton Laboratory near Oxford and later for BP, where he moved into management.

He was chief executive of the International Petroleum Exchange (IPE) from 1999 to 2005 and vice chairman from 2005 to 2006.

He was the longest-serving CEO at Lloyd's of London, during which time, he led a transformation of the business and introduced digitisation of many of the processes, particularly in claims.

As executive chairman of Cunningham Lindsey from 2014 to 2018, he led a major transformation and restructure of the business and carried out a successful trade sale of Cunningham Lindsey to Sedgwick.

As non-executive chairman of Brit Insurance, he took the company public in 2014 and led a successful sale of the company in February 2015.

As a member of the PRA Practitioner Panel, he served as rotating chair of the insurance sub-committee, an independent statutory panel which represents the interests of practitioners regulated by the Bank of England.
