= Fairfax Financial =

Financial holding company based in Toronto, Ontario

Fairfax Financial Holdings Limited
- Type: Public
- Traded as: TSX: FFH; TSX: FFH.U; S&P/TSX 60 component
- Industry: Insurance
- Founded: 1985; 41 years ago
- Headquarters: Toronto, Ontario, Canada
- Key people: V. Prem Watsa (chairman & CEO)
- Revenue: ▲US$33.627 Billion (FY 2025)
- Operating income: ▲US$4.630 Billion (FY 2025)
- Net income: ▲US$4.772 Billion (FY 2025)
- Total assets: ▲US$107.788 Billion (FY 2025)
- Total equity: ▲US$30.874 Billion (FY 2025)
- Number of employees: 60,000+ (2025)
- Divisions: (list of divisions)
- Subsidiaries: (list of subsidiaries)
- Website: www.fairfax.ca

Fairfax Financial Holdings Limited is a Canadian diversified financial holding company headquartered in Toronto, Ontario. Founded in 1985 by V. Prem Watsa, the company is anchored in property and casualty insurance and reinsurance but has grown into a global conglomerate spanning consumer services, retail, logistics, agriculture, hospitality, and banking across multiple continents. Roughly two thirds of its earnings originate from North America, with the balance drawn from Europe and Asia.

Fairfax ranks among the top 20 property and casualty insurers globally, writing US$33 billion in gross premiums through 26 decentralized insurance companies, and manages a consolidated investment portfolio exceeding US$70 billion. Listed on the Toronto Stock Exchange (TSX: FFH, FFH.U) and a constituent of the S&P/TSX 60 Index, its subsidiaries and holdings include Odyssey Group, Brit Insurance, Recipe Unlimited, Sleep Country Canada, and Bauer Hockey.

Fairfax's investment portfolios are managed by Hamblin Watsa Investment Counsel (HWIC), applying a long-term value-oriented approach influenced by Benjamin Graham and John Templeton. Since 1985, book value per share has compounded at 18.7 percent annually, and the common share price at 19.2 percent annually (including dividends), with the stock rising from CDN$3.25 in 1985 to over CDN$2,000 by the end of 2024 — one of the strongest long-term compounding records of any publicly listed Canadian company.

== History ==
=== Markel Financial ===
Fairfax was incorporated as Markel Service of Canada on March 13, 1951, and continued under the Canada Business Corporations Act in 1976. The name was subsequently changed to Markel Financial Holdings Ltd.

In 1984, Prem Watsa left GW Asset Management to found his own asset management firm, Hamblin Watsa Investment Counsel Ltd. together with his former boss from Confed, Tony Hamblin. Tony was the Chief Investment Officer at Confed. The five founding partners were: Tony Hamblin, Prem Watsa, Roger Lace, Brian Bradstreet and Frances Burke.

In 1985, Watsa took control of Markel Financial, a Canadian-based specialist in trucking insurance. The company was controlled by the Virginia-based Markel family.

=== Fairfax Financial ===
In May 1987, Watsa re-organized Markel Financial Holdings Limited and renamed it Fairfax Financial Holdings Limited (FAIRFAX: short for "fair, friendly acquisitions").

Prem Watsa has served as chairman and chief executive officer of Fairfax Financial Holdings Limited since 1985 and as vice president of Hamblin Watsa Investment Counsel since 1985. Watsa, directly, and indirectly through 1109519 Ontario Limited, The Sixty Two Investment Company Limited and 810679 Ontario Ltd., owns the controlling equity voting interest of Fairfax Financial Holdings Limited ("Fairfax").

As Japan's equity market surged through 1988, Watsa was publicly skeptical. In the FY1988 Letter to Shareholders he wrote that Fairfax had predicted "a collapse in the highly speculative Japanese stock market," and concluded: "If this continues, Japan will be the only equity market of consequence. Count me among the skeptics." Fairfax backed the view by purchasing Nikkei put options. The Nikkei 225 peaked at 38,915 on December 29, 1989 and fell to 23,848 by year-end 1990 — a decline of roughly 39%. The FY1990 annual report disclosed realized gains from those puts, with book value reaching $17.29 per share by December 1990.

=== 1990s ===
On August 13, 1998, Fairfax Financial Holdings completed the acquisition of Crum & Forster for approximately US$565 million in cash. The acquisition significantly expanded Fairfax’s U.S. commercial insurance operations and added specialty underwriting capabilities.

By the late 1990s Watsa was alarmed by what he described in the FY1999 Letter as "unbelievable speculation" in U.S. equities, citing extreme internet-stock valuations and unusually rapid share turnover. His summary was blunt: "We do not believe in 'New Eras'." Fairfax entered the period holding US$700 million notional of S&P 500 Index puts and US$162 million notional of contracts on a basket of technology stocks, maintaining roughly US$600 million in notional exposure. The Nasdaq Composite fell approximately 78% from its March 2000 peak to its October 2002 trough. The FY2001 letter reported $75.1 million in realized gains from the technology-basket puts and $11.4 million from S&P 500 Index puts. Watsa acknowledged that the position had been painful while the S&P 500 rose — a reminder that being right on the thesis and being right on the timing are different things.

=== 2000s ===
As early as the 2003, in an annual report issued by the company, chief executive Prem Watsa raised concerns about securitized products and talks about the subprime mortgage crisis and the United States housing bubble.

In an interview in The Globe and Mail in 2007, Watsa said believed that the global credit squeeze is in its "early days", and indicated he believed there may be similarities to the Japanese asset price bubble.

The investment team of HWIC benefited from the subprime fallout, like John Paulson's New York-based Paulson & Co., Kyle Bass' Hayman Capital, Andrew Lahde's California-based Lahde Capital, Julian Robertson's "Tiger Cubs" (formerly known as "Tiger Management Corp."), and Michael Burry's Scion Capital (White Mountains Insurance Group is a minority investor in Scion Capital LLC), they have used derivatives to bet on the housing bubble. As of September 30, 2007, Fairfax and its subsidiaries owned an enormous credit default swap (CDS) book with a $18.5 billion notional amount and an average term to expiry of 4.2 years, on about 25 to 30 companies, the majority of which were bond insurers and mortgage lenders. The CDS book had a cost of $344 million, and a market value of $546 million. The market value of these swaps had fluctuated significantly in the 3rd quarter of 2007 from less than $200 million at the end of June, to $537 million at the end of July to almost $1 billion (twice that value) in August to $544 million at the end of September.

=== 2010s ===
As of December 31, 2010, Fairfax had total assets of approximately $31.7 billion, and its revenue for the prior twelve months was approximately $6.2 billion.

On September 23, 2013, Fairfax made an offer to purchase cell phone maker BlackBerry for $4.7 billion or $9.00 a share. BlackBerry announced it had signed a letter of intent but would be open to other offers until November 4, 2013. Fairfax already held 10% of BlackBerry. The deal was later scrapped in favor of a US$1 billion cash injection which, according to one analyst, represented the level of confidence BlackBerry's largest shareholder had in the company.

On January 30, 2015, Fairfax Financial Holdings Limited launched Fairfax India Holdings Corporation, following the election of Narendra Modi, raising approximately US$1 billion to make long-term investments in India.

In 2016, Fairfax offered seed funding to Kitchener startup, DOZR Inc. through their investment and innovation unit, Fair Ventures. Fair Ventures and Fairfax went on to support DOZR through multiple funding pitches, including the Colorado-based BaseCamp Equity Partners pitch in 2019. This pitch landed DOZR with $14 million CAD.

In July 2017, Fairfax Financial completed its acquisition of Allied World Assurance Company Holdings, AG for approximately US$4.9 billion in cash. Allied World continues to operate under its existing brand as a global specialty insurer within the Fairfax group.

In 2017, Fairfax Financial Holdings increased its ownership of Torstar's non-voting shares from 20% to 40%. In late May 2020, Torstar accepted an offer of a sale of the company to NordStar Capital. The $52 million deal, supported by Fairfax, was expected to close by year end.

On April 24, 2018, it was announced that Fairfax Financial Holdings Ltd. would acquire the Canadian division of Toys "R" Us for approximately $234 million with the intention to keep the 82 remaining stores in Canada open under the Toys "R" Us brand even after the chain's liquidation in the United States. The deal was completed on June 1, 2018. Fairfax sold Toys R Us Canada to businessman Doug Putman in 2021.

=== 2020s ===
On August 9, 2022, Fairfax Financial proposed a $954 million takeover bid for the Canadian restaurant operator Recipe Unlimited Corp.

On December 26, 2023, Fairfax Financial completed the acquisition of an additional 46.32% equity interest in Gulf Insurance Group from Kuwait Projects Company (Holding) K.S.C.P., increasing its ownership from 43.69% to 90.01% and obtaining control of the company, with a mandatory tender offer to remaining shareholders announced for the first quarter of 2024.

On July 22, 2024, Fairfax Financial agreed to acquire Sleep Country Canada Holdings Inc. for approximately C$1.7 billion, through an all-cash offer. The sale received final court approval from the Ontario Superior Court of Justice in late September 2024. Sleep Country continues to operate as a separate entity under the Fairfax umbrella.

On December 20, 2024, Fairfax Financial increased its ownership of Peak Achievement Athletics Inc. to 100% by acquiring the remaining equity interests from Sagard Holdings Inc. and other minority shareholders for total consideration of $765 million, resulting in the company’s full consolidation.

In the fourth quarter of 2024, Fairfax Financial received an approximately $100 million dividend from Digit Insurance, which management stated was a one-time distribution related to Digit’s initial public offering in May 2024, in which the company was valued at approximately US$3 billion.

On December 5, 2025, Fairfax Financial realized proceeds of approximately $316 million from the partial disposition of its investment in Orla Mining, generating an estimated gain of about $177 million on an equity position accumulated largely between 2022 and 2024, while retaining a remaining stake valued at approximately $1.0 billion at year-end.

On 14 October 2026, the Government of India's Cabinet Committee on Economic Affairs approved the sale of a combined 60.72% stake in IDBI Bank to Fairfax Financial for ₹52,878 crore, with the Government of India and the Life Insurance Corporation of India (LIC) divesting 30.48% and 30.24% respectively at ₹81 per share. The Government of India and LIC, which together held roughly 95% of IDBI Bank before the sale, are to retain a combined residual stake of about 15% for later disposal, with the remainder held by public shareholders. The transfer to Fairfax is still subject to final regulatory clearance from the Reserve Bank of India.

== Subsidiaries and Investments ==
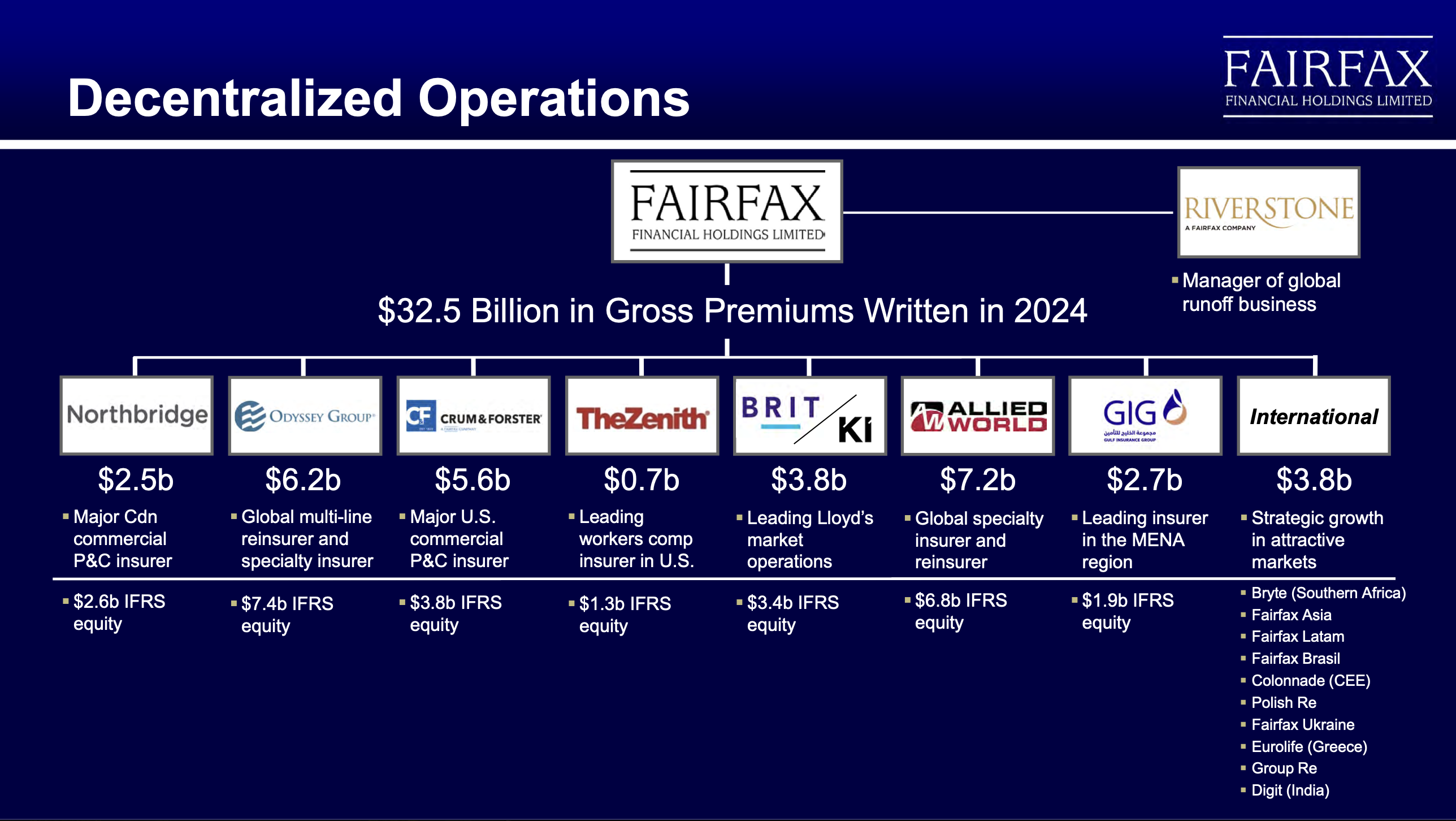
Insurance Operations slide from 2025 AGM

=== Insurance Subsidiaries ===
- Allied World (North America)
- Odyssey Group (North America)
- Crum & Forster (North America)
- Brit (Europe)
- Gulf Insurance (Asia)
- Northbridge (North America)
- Digit (Asia)
- Zenith (North America)
- Bryte (Africa)
- Southbridge Chile (South America)
- SBI Seguros Uruguay (South America)
- Meridional Seguros (South America)
- 15+ Other Insurance Businesses
- Colonnade (Europe)

=== Non-Insurance Subsidiaries ===
- Fairfax India
- Recipe Unlimited
- Sleep Country Canada
- Kennedy Wilson
- Grivalia Hospitality
- Peak Achievement
- Meadow Foods
- Thomas Cook India
- Dexterra Group
- Other public and private investments

=== Securities ===
- Eurobank Ergasias
- Poseidon
- Exco Resources
- Commercial International Bank
- Orla Mining
- Occidental Petroleum
- CVS Health
- Under Armour
- Other public and private investments

== Corporate Affairs ==
=== Investment Strategy ===
Fairfax employs a long-term, value-oriented investment strategy centred on compounding book value per share. The company uses insurance float as a primary source of investable capital, allocating it across public equities, fixed income securities, and private businesses with a focus on total return and downside protection. Investments are typically made with a margin of safety and a long holding period, and the portfolio has historically included both controlling interests in operating companies and minority stakes in publicly traded firms.

Capital allocation decisions are made at the holding company level. Excess capital is directed toward supporting profitable underwriting growth at subsidiaries, acquiring high-quality businesses, reducing debt, and repurchasing Fairfax shares when they trade below management’s estimate of intrinsic value. The company's decentralized structure lets managers retain significant autonomy over operations, while the holding company oversees risk, culture and capital deployment.

=== Annual Letter & Shareholders' Meeting ===
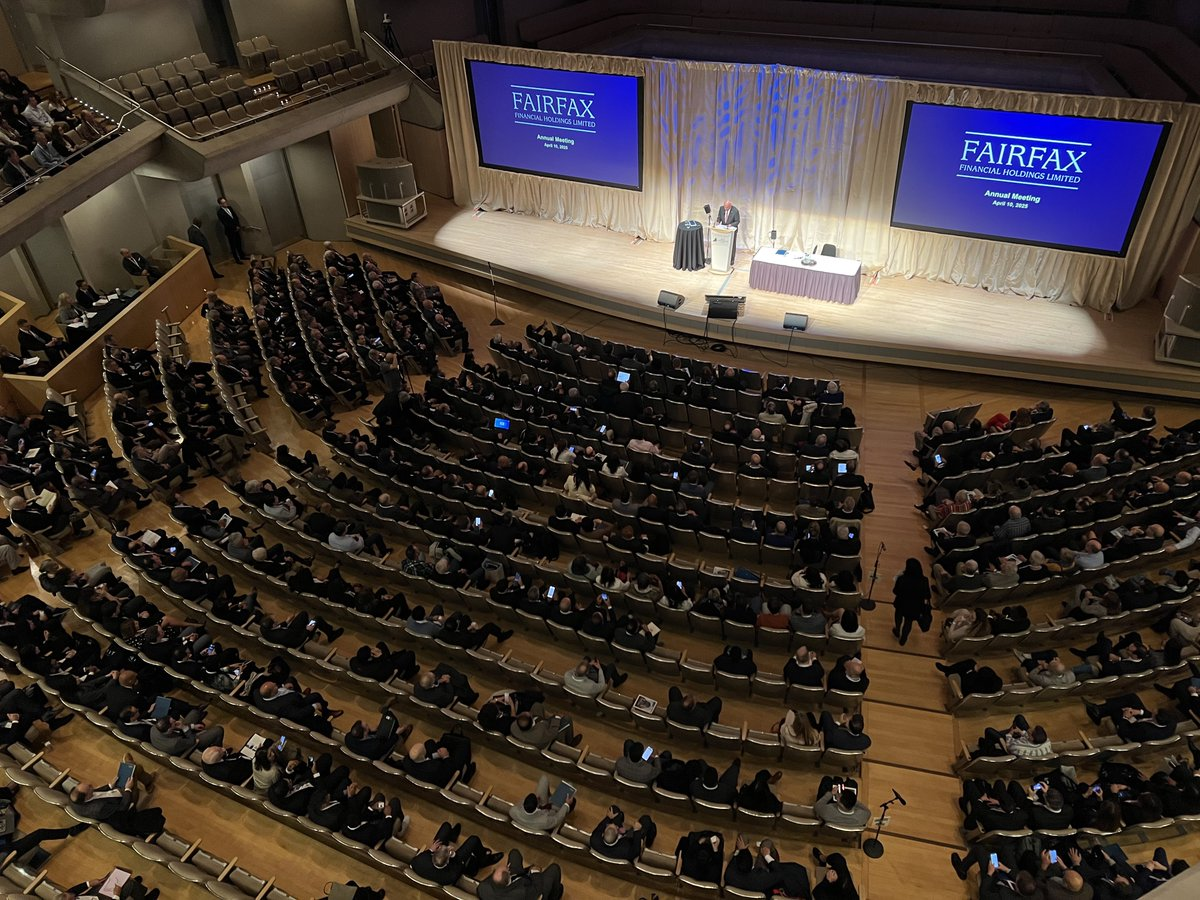
2025 Shareholders' Meeting at Roy Thompson Hall

Watsa's annual letters to shareholders, published each March alongside Fairfax's year-end results, have become essential reading in the value investing community.

Written in a candid, conversational style, the letters cover Fairfax's underwriting performance, investment philosophy, and portfolio activity, while also offering Watsa's broader views on macroeconomic conditions and financial markets.

Fairfax's Annual Shareholders' Meeting, held at Roy Thompson Hall in Toronto each April, draws a following of long-term shareholders and serves as a forum for Watsa to expand on the themes raised in the letter and take questions directly from investors.

=== Governance ===
Watsa controls Fairfax through a dual-class share structure that insulates the company from short-term activist pressure and ensures continuity of its investment philosophy. Watsa has served as both Chairman and CEO since the company's founding in 1985. His son Ben Watsa is expected to succeed him as Chairman, reflecting the family's intention to maintain its guiding influence over the business, while Peter Clarke, President and Chief Operating Officer, is expected to succeed Prem as CEO.

Fairfax operates under a formal set of Guiding Principles that govern conduct across its global operations. In 2023, Watsa added the Golden Rule, treat others as you would want to be treated, to these principles, a reflection of the ethical culture he has sought to embed throughout the organization.

Watsa's annual salary has been fixed at $600,000 for decades, a figure notable for its modesty relative to the scale of the enterprise. Fairfax maintains an employee share ownership program available to staff at all levels across its companies, and commits 2% of pre-tax profits to charitable causes annually, an obligation Watsa has maintained as a formal part of how the company operates.

Watsa's care for employees extends beyond compensation. In 2024, three long-serving members of Fairfax Financial passed away within months, including Prem's brother-in-law and chief of staff Vinodh Loganadhan, whose death was caused by an undetected arterial blockage. In response, Fairfax rolled out a cardiac screening program for all employees aged 50 and older and their spouses across its global companies — one that identified ten North American employees who unknowingly needed a stent within its first few months alone. It's emblematic of a broader culture in which Fairfax treats its people as family.

== Other investments ==
- Fairfax Asia, Fairfax Asia Limited ("Fairfax Asia") is the fastest growing insurance line of business within the Fairfax Group.
- Fairfax Brasil, Fairfax Brasil Seguros Corporativos S.A. ("Fairfax Brasil") is a Brazilian property and casualty insurance, headquartered in São Paulo.
- Polish Re, Polish Re (Polskie Towarzystwo Reasekuracji Spółka Akcyjna) based in Warsaw, Poland, writes reinsurance business in Central and Eastern Europe (100%-owned by Fairfax).
- Advent Capital (Holdings) PLC, Advent Capital, based in London, in the U.K., provides specialty property and casualty insurance, operating through Syndicates 780 and 3330 at Lloyd's London (100%-owned by Fairfax).
- Alliance Insurance, Fairfax owns a 20% stake in Alliance Insurance (Dubai).
- Alltrust Insurance Company of China, Fairfax owns a 15% stake in Alltrust Insurance Company in China.
- BlackBerry Limited
- Digit general insurance Fairfax has backed up this startup in India
- Bengaluru International Airport Limited which operates the Kempegowda International Airport in Bengaluru, India. Fairfax owns 64% of BIAL and in the midst of purchasing additional 10% shares from Siemens while the rest is owned by the governments of India and Karnataka.
- Recipe Unlimited, a Canadian food services giant
- General Fidelity Insurance Company, On August 17, 2010, Fairfax purchased 100% of General Fidelity Insurance Company (GFIC – a runoff company), for approximately $241 million. GFIC will be under RiverStone, Fairfax runoff group.
- Gulf Insurance Co., On September 28, 2010, Fairfax purchased 41.3% of Gulf Insurance Co. (a Kuwait insurance company), for approximately $217 million.
- First Mercury Financial Corporation, On October 28, 2010, Fairfax announced to acquire all of the outstanding shares of First Mercury common stock for approximately $294 million. First Mercury will become the excess and surplus lines platform for Crum & Forster.
- The Pacific Insurance Berhad, Pacific Insurance is headquartered in Kuala Lumpur, Malaysia. On December 3, 2010, Fairfax announced to acquire Malaysian insurer, The Pacific Insurance Berhad, for approximately US$64 million. Pacific will join the Fairfax Asia group. (The deal is expected to close in the 1st Q. of 2011)
- Thomas Cook India, In May 2012 Fairfax invested in the company through Fairbridge Capital (Mauritius) Limited
- Jordan Kuwait Bank, Odyssey Re, a wholly owned subsidiary of Fairfax owns a 4.8% stake of the Jordan Kuwait Bank.
- ICICI Lombard. ICICI Lombard is the largest private general insurance company in India, with a 12.5% market share. ICICI Bank, which owns the 74% of ICICI Lombard not owned by Fairfax, requested Indian government approval to sell a 5.9% stake in itself (ICICI Financial Services Ltd.) for $600 million to a group of private equity investors. ICICI Bank was looking at valuing ICICI Holdings at $10 billion. Goldman Sachs and other foreign funds were interested in buying the stake. Fairfax is carrying the minority interest in ICICI Lombard, on its balance sheet at $60 million, which appears to be a significant discount to intrinsic value (The 26% stake in ICICI Lombard is via Fairfax Asia, which is owned 100% by Fairfax Financial—which also includes a 29.5% economic interest owned by Odyssey Re Holdings Corp).
- Overstock.com. Fairfax holds a 16.5% stake in online retailer Overstock.com (Chou Associates Management Inc. holds a 9.9% stake). Patrick M. Byrne, the CEO, chairman and owner of Overstock comes from a family of value investors. He is the son of John J. Byrne, former chairman of Berkshire Hathaway's GEICO insurance subsidiary and White Mountains Insurance Group.
- Chou Associates Fund, In late 2002, Fairfax invested $50 million in Chou Associates Fund and another $50 million in the first half of 2003 (Fairfax apparently owns more than 26% of Chou Associates Fund).
- AXA Insurance, AXA Group (France) completed a transaction of sale of its Ukrainian subsidiaries PJSC Insurance Company AXA Insurance and ALC Insurance Company AHA Life Insurance.
- CSB Bank Ltd (formerly The Catholic Syrian Bank Limited), In 2018, Fairfax took a 51% stake in India based CSB Bank Ltd
- IDBI Bank, In 2026, Fairfax acquired 60.72% stake in IDBI Bank.

=== Other notable transactions ===
- AbitibiBowater Inc. (new—scheduled to close on March 31, 2008) Fairfax made an investment of $350 million in AbitibiBowater convertible debentures with an 8% cash coupon. The debentures are convertible into common shares of AbitibiBowater Inc at US$10.00 per share. The debentures has an ability to pay interest in the form of additional "pay-in-kind" debentures at a rate of 10%, and has an AbitibiBowater subsidiary guarantee. They have a maturity of 5 years and are non-callable. Fairfax will have the right to appoint two directors to the Board of Directors.
- Toys 'R' Us Inc. which it sold in 2021 to Putnam.
- Peak Achievement Athletics, parent company to Bauer Hockey
