= Brit Insurance =

General insurance and reinsurance provider

Brit Group Services Ltd
- Type: Subsidiary
- Industry: Insurance
- Founded: 1995
- Headquarters: London, England, UK
- Key people: Richard Ward (Chairman), Martin Thompson (Group Chief Executive Officer)
- Products: Insurance, Reinsurance
- Revenue: £1,070.5 million (2014)
- Operating income: £162.6 million (2014)
- Net income: £139.0 million (2014)
- Parent: Fairfax Financial
- Website: www.britinsurance.com

Brit is an international general insurance and reinsurance group specialising in commercial insurance. It was acquired by Fairfax Financial in May 2015.

== History ==
The Company was founded as Benfield & Rea Investment Trust in 1995. In 1996 it acquired Stewart Syndicates Limited and in 1999 it went on to buy Wren PLC. In 1999 it ceased to be an investment trust and relisted as Brit Insurance Holdings PLC.

Achilles Netherlands Holdings B.V., a company formed by funds managed by private equity firms Apollo Management and CVC Capital Partners, agreed to acquire the firm for £888 million in October 2010. Its offer was declared unconditional in March 2011 and following this Brit Insurance was removed from the FTSE 250 Index.

On 18 June 2012 Brit announced the sale of its subsidiary Brit Insurance Limited (BIL) to RiverStone Group. The company was subject to an initial public offering in March 2014.

The company was acquired by Fairfax Financial in May 2015.

== Operations ==
Brit has a diversified portfolio of businesses both in terms of geographic location and types of business. Business is written through Lloyd's Syndicate 2987.
