= Prem Watsa =

Indian-Canadian businessman (born 1950)

Prem Watsa CM
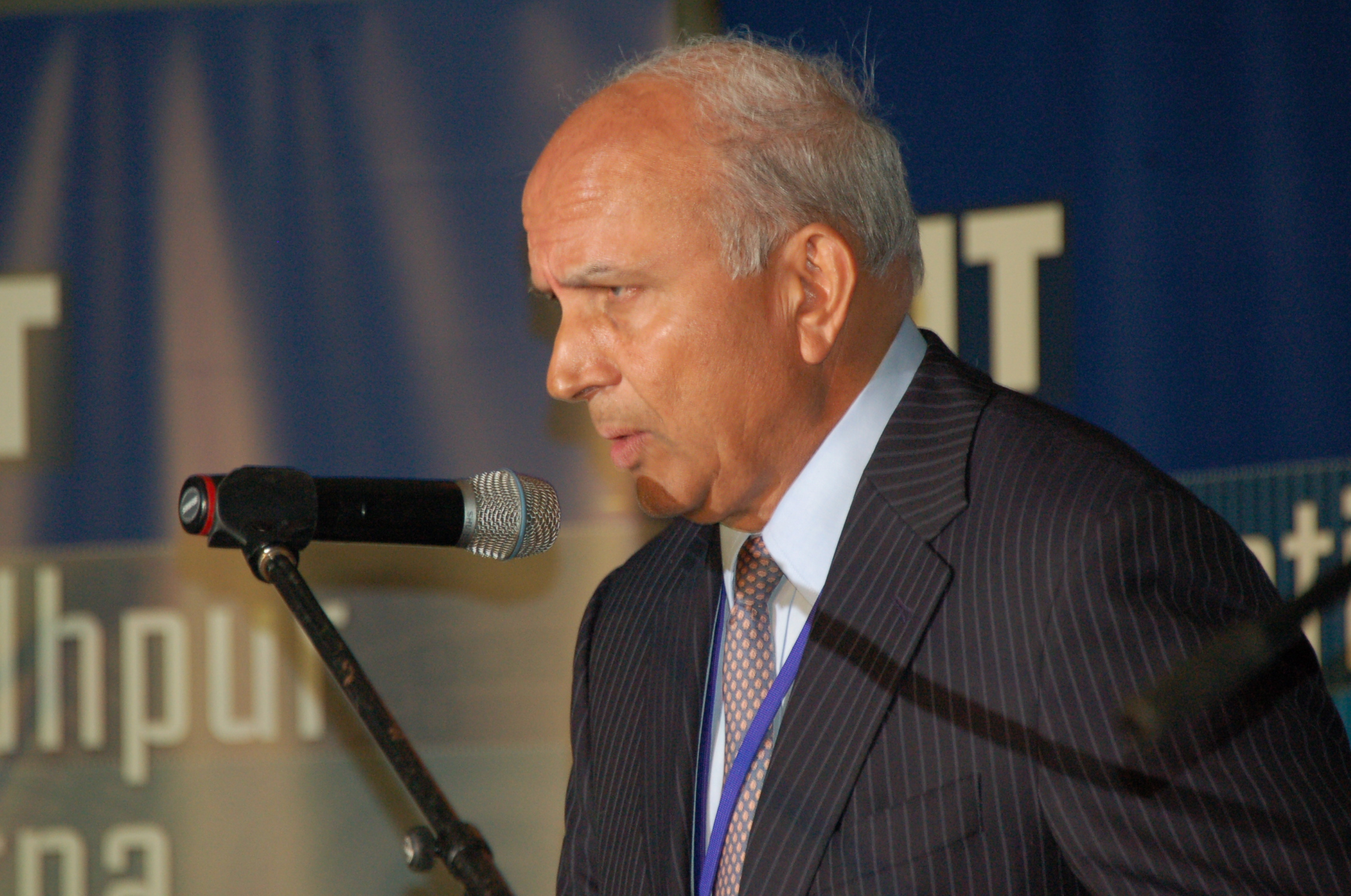

9th Chancellor of the University of Waterloo
- In office 2009–2014
- Preceded by: Mike Lazaridis
- Succeeded by: Tom Jenkins
- President/Vice Chancellor: David Johnston

Chairman of Fairfax Financial Holdings

Personal details
- Born: 5 August 1950 (age 76) Hyderabad, Hyderabad State (present-day Telangana), India
- Education: IIT Madras; University of Western Ontario
- Occupation: Businessman

V. Prem Watsa CM (born 5 August 1950) is an Indian-Canadian billionaire businessman who is the founder, chairman, and chief executive of Fairfax Financial Holdings, based in Toronto.

== Early life and education ==
Vivian Prem Watsa was born in Hyderabad, India. He attended Hyderabad Public School and the Indian Institute of Technology Madras where he graduated with a degree in chemical engineering. He later moved to London, Ontario, and went to the Richard Ivey School of Business at the University of Western Ontario, where he earned an MBA. Watsa left India with US$8, sold furnaces and air conditioners to financially support his university education. He is a distinguished alumnus of IIT Madras.

== Career ==
After graduating, Watsa worked for the insurance company Confederation Life. In 1984, he started an investment firm with his former boss Tony Hamblin, called Hamblin Watsa Investment Counsel. In 1985, Watsa took over Markel Financial, a small Canadian trucking insurance company that was verging on bankruptcy, and renamed it Fairfax Financial Holdings. He helped grow the company, where it reached annual revenues of $8 billion a year in 2012. Despite his success, he largely stayed out of the public eye, only beginning to hold investor conference calls in 2001. He has been called the "Canadian Warren Buffett."

On 22 January 2012, it was reported he was to be appointed to the board of directors of Research In Motion (RIM) in the company's largest ever corporate shakeup. Watsa resigned in August 2013, but kept his investment in the company. On 23 September 2013, BlackBerry announced that it had signed a letter of intent to be acquired by Fairfax Financial Holdings in a $4.7 billion deal. Fairfax Financial Holdings is "the largest insurer of the for-profit bail industry in the U.S."

In April 2017, Watsa brought attention to concerns of a real estate bubble in Toronto. He asserts that most Canadian banks cannot survive a 50% drop in the value of real estate. "It's going to come down, and a lot of people are going to get hurt" said Watsa during Fairfax's annual general meeting.

=== Volunteering ===
He is a member of the Board of Trustees of The Hospital for Sick Children, a member of the Advisory Board for the Richard Ivey School of Business, a member of the Board of Directors of the Royal Ontario Museum Foundation, and Chairman of the Investment Committee of St. Paul's Anglican Church.

In June 2009, he was appointed as the ninth chancellor of the University of Waterloo.

In September 2017, he was elected as the first chancellor of Huron University College.

=== Awards ===
He was named a Member of the Order of Canada in 2015. Watsa was inducted into the Canadian Business Hall of Fame in 2024.

He was awarded the fourth highest civilian award of India, Padma Shri, in January 2020.

== See also ==
- List of University of Waterloo people
