= Thomas Cook India =

Indian travel agency

- Type: Public Limited Company
- Traded as: NSE: THOMASCOOK; BSE: 500413
- Industry: Tourism; Hospitality
- Founded: 1881; 145 years ago
- Founder: Thomas Cook
- Headquarters: Thomas Cook (India) Limited, Thomas Cook Building, Dr D.N. Road, Mumbai–400001, India
- Products: Package Holidays; Foreign Exchange
- Revenue: 412.58Cr (2015)
- Owner: Fairfax Financial (2013-); Thomas Cook Group (2007-2013); Thomas Cook AG (2001-2007); Thomas Cook & Son (1881-2001)
- Number of employees: 2944 (December 2015)
- Website: www.thomascook.in

Thomas Cook (India) Ltd. is an Indian travel agency, headquartered in Mumbai, India, providing travel services including Foreign Exchange, International and Domestic Holidays, Visas, Passports, Travel Insurance and MICE. Founded in 1881 by Thomas Cook, the founder of the now defunct British brand Thomas Cook & Son, who established its first office in India and eventually extended to over 233 locations, in 94 cities across India, Sri Lanka and Mauritius. Thomas Cook India is a subsidiary of Fairfax Financial Holdings Limited, through its wholly owned subsidiary, Fairbridge Capital (Mauritius) Limited, and its controlled affiliates which holds 67.63% of the company.

== History ==
Thomas Cook had many ventures including the invention of the world's package tour in 1841, the first pre-paid hotel coupon in 1868, creation of the first holiday brochure in 1858, and conceptualization of the first Travellers Cheques in 1874.

In 1881, Thomas Cook started its India operations in Bombay (later renamed Mumbai), and in October 1978, saw it christened Thomas Cook (India) Ltd. The company made its first public issue in February 1983, and commenced operations in Mauritius in 2000. In the same year, they acquired the Sri Lanka business from Thomas Cook Overseas Ltd, UK.

In 2006, Thomas Cook India Limited acquired LKP Forex Limited and Travel Corporation (India) Pvt. Ltd. (TCI).

In May 2012, Fairbridge Capital (Mauritius) Limited acquired Thomas Cook India, and became a part of Fairfax Group, Canada.

In 2013, Thomas Cook India Limited acquired Quess Corp (formerly known as Ikya Group - HR, IT Services, Facilities Management, Food Services, Skill Development), and Sterling Holiday Resorts.

In 2015, Thomas Cook Lanka Pvt. Ltd. (a subsidiary of Thomas Cook India Limited) acquired Luxe Asia Pvt. Ltd., Sri Lanka, a regional Destination Management Company handling inbound tourists from globally generating markets to its destinations. In the same year, TCIL announced the acquisition of Kuoni Travel (India) Private Limited, a travel operator in India, and Kuoni Travel (China) Limited, a travel operator in Hong Kong.

In September 2017, Thomas Cook acquired Tata Capital's forex and travel business. In the aftermath of the collapse of Thomas Cook in the UK, the Indian namesake was considering rebranding itself to avoid the negative perception caused by the collapse of the UK travel company.

Number	Year	Description	Ref(s)
1	2019	The collapse of Thomas Cook India's former parent Thomas Cook Group causes major confusion to Indian customers, who were assumed that Thomas Cook India had also entered liquidation proceedings (by the United Kingdom Government)	
2	2019	Thomas Cook India Ltd Opens New Outlet In Punjab	
3	2016	Thomas Cook taps into India's m-commerce growth opportunity launches India's first end-to-end Holiday-App	
4	2016	Thomas Cook India targets Tier III growth markets via small tech assisted outlets	
5	2015	Thomas Cook India Acquired Sri Lanka Based Luxe Asia	
6	2015	Announced Closure of Kuoni Travel India Private Limited Company	
7	2015	Acquisition of Kuoni Group's Travel Business in India	
8	2015	Launched Thomas Cook One Currency Card	
9	2015	Launched Thomas Cook Forex Mobile App	
10	2013	Acquisition of Stake in Quess Corp	
11	2012	Acquisition of 76.81% Stake by Fairbridge in Thomas Cook (India) Limited from Thomas Cook UK and TCIM and subsequent announcement of open offer	
12	2012	Incorporation of Thomas Cook Lanka (Private) Limited, a 100% Subsidiary of the Company	
13	2012	Launch of Borderless Prepaid Multicurrency Forex Card	
14	2011	Signed an agreement for marketing and distribution of borderless prepaid multicurrency foreign exchange card	
15	2011	Incorporation of TC Visa Services(India) Limited in Maharashtra, a wholly owned Subsidiary of Travel Corporation (India) Limited, which is a 100% Subsidiary of the Company	
16	2010	Execution of a Seven Year Arrangement with New Delhi International Airport	
17	2010	Launch of 9 Foreign Exchange and Travel Counters	
18	2009	Issue of 50,650,699 Shares through a Rights Issue by Thomas Cook (India) Limited	
19	2008	Acquisition of 74.9% Stake by Thomas Cook UK and TCIM in Thomas Cook (India) Limited	
20	2007	Thomas Cook India Limited & LKP Forex Merger	
21	2006	100% acquisition of Travel Corporation (India) Limited by Thomas Cook (India) Limited	
22	2005	100% Acquisition by Dubai Financial (LLC) of TCIM	
23	2000	Commencement of Operations in Sri Lanka	
25	1983	Listing of Thomas Cook India Limited on BSE Pursuant	
26	1978	Conversion of the branch office into a private limited company	
27	1881	Thomas Cook & Son opens its first branch office in Bombay	

Thomas Cook India logo, as per British logo used between 2001 – 2013

=== Rebrand 2022 ===
At the end of 2022, Thomas Cook India rebranded the business with a new logo, replacing the 2001 – 2013 British logo.
