= Andrew Lahde =

Retired hedge fund manager

Andrew Lahde is a retired hedge fund manager, who founded Lahde Capital in Santa Monica, California.

Lahde received fame for his return rates in 2007. He also gained attention for the nature of his retirement, which he announced through a letter that skewered the business culture in America.

== Education ==
Lahde earned a bachelor's degree in finance from Michigan State University and an MBA from the Anderson School of Business at the University of California Los Angeles.

== Career ==
Lahde founded his own hedge fund, Lahde Capital, which was based out of Santa Monica. The fund speculated on increases of U.S. subprime mortgage defaults.

Lahde's hedge fund strategy was based on his knowledge of real estate, real estate finance, the complex world of securitized real estate finance, and various financial vehicles associated with the transactions. What differentiated Lahde from many other hedge fund operations was an understanding of the underlying asset, residential real estate.

In September 2008, Lahde closed his fund, telling investors that credit problems - the basis of his profits - were likely to continue, but that the possibility of defaults by counterparties was too high. The London Guardian identified Lahde in 2009 as one of 25 "people at the heart of the meltdown" and one of "six more who saw it coming."

In 2018 Lahde opened a new fund that took a long position on rhodium. That rhodium strategy went on to return Lahde's clients over +1000% in 2020.

== Controversy ==
On October 17, 2008, he released an open good-bye letter to his investors, in which he said that the "low hanging fruit, i.e. idiots whose parents paid for prep school, Yale, and then the Harvard MBA, was there for the taking." He concluded his letter by proposing to legalize hemp (but not necessarily marijuana), saying that hemp had been used for at least 5,000 years for cloth and food, as well as just about everything that is produced from petroleum products, and thus should be part of making the U.S. "truly become self-sufficient". He also said that marijuana is only kept illegal because "Corporate America, which owns Congress, would rather sell you Paxil, Zoloft, Xanax, and other addictive drugs, than allow you to grow a plant in your home without some of the profits going into their coffers."

Lahde's increased media visibility has attracted attention from hemp-legalization organizations, and even fan-merchandise surrounding his much-reported farewell letter.
