= Incurred but not reported =

Estimated amount owed by an insurer on claims not yet reported

In insurance, incurred but not reported (IBNR) claims are the amount owed by an insurer to all valid claimants who have had a covered loss but have not yet reported it. Since the insurer knows neither how many of these losses have occurred, nor the severity of each loss, IBNR is necessarily an estimate. The sum of IBNR losses plus reported losses yields an estimate of the total eventual liabilities the insurer will cover, known as ultimate losses.

== IBNR and IBNER ==
The term "IBNR" is sometimes ambiguous, as it is not always clear whether it includes development on reported claims.

Pure IBNR refers to only unreported claims, not any development on reported claims.

Incurred but not enough reported (IBNER), in contrast, refers to development on reported claims. For example, when a claim is first reported, a $100 payment might be made, and a $900 case reserve might be established, for a total initial reported amount of $1000. However, the claim may later settle for a larger amount, resulting in $2000 of payments from the insurer to the claimant before the claim is closed. The estimated amount of this future development on reported claims is known as IBNER.

In some cases, the term "IBNR" refers only to pure IBNR; in other case, it is understood to be the sum of pure IBNR and IBNER.

== Methods of estimation ==
Actuarial loss reserving methods including the chain-ladder method, Bornhuetter–Ferguson method, expected claims technique, and others are used to estimate IBNR and, hence, ultimate losses. Since the implementation of Solvency II, stochastic claims reserving methods have become more common.

== See also ==
- Loss reserving
- Actuarial science
