= Gaw Capital =

Hong Kong real estate investment firm

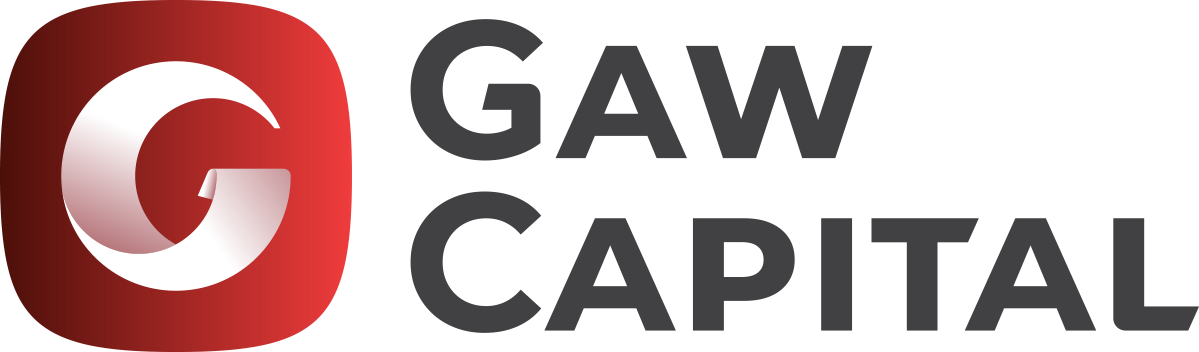

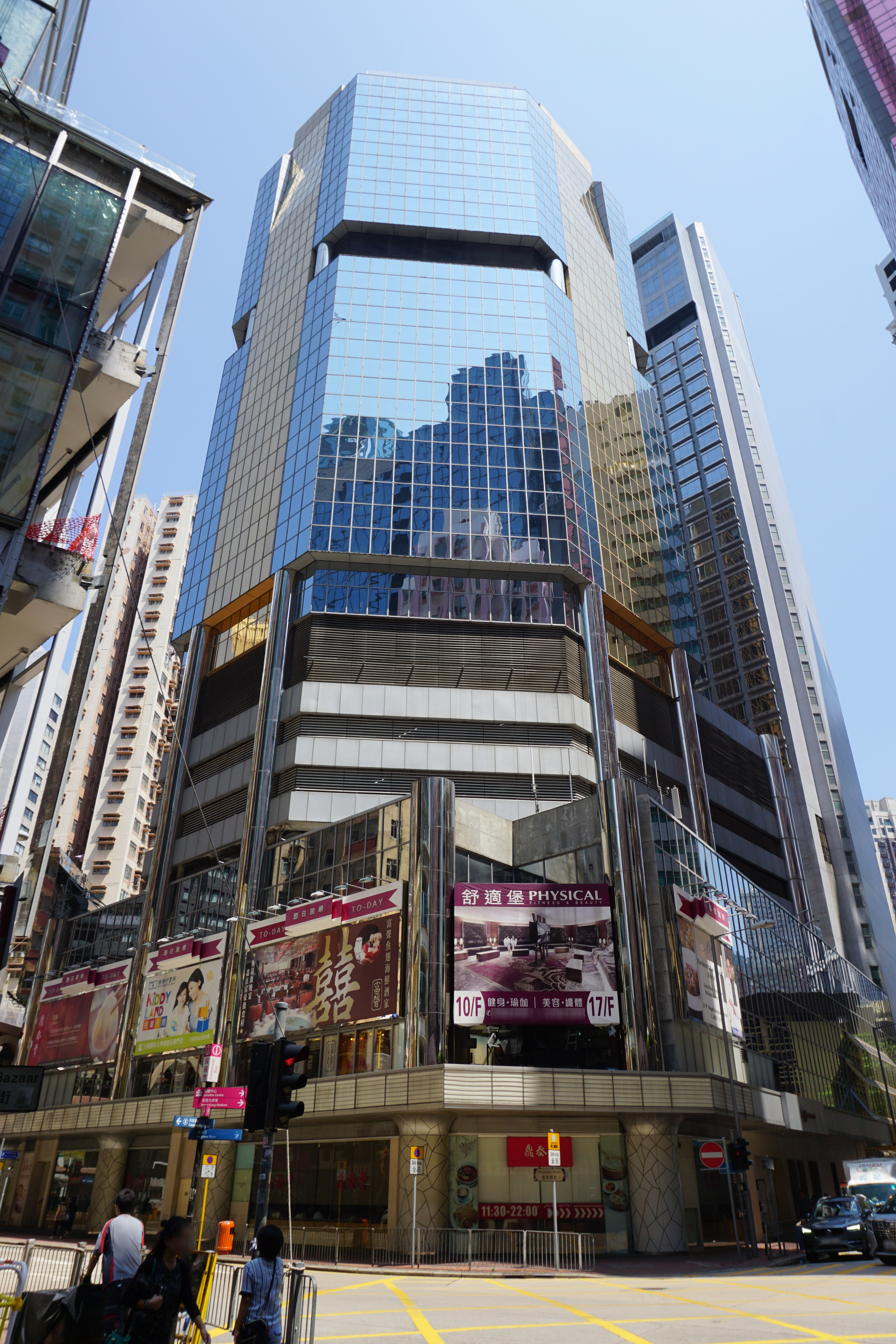
- Headquarters in Causeway Bay, Hong Kong
- Native name: 基滙資本
- Company type: Private
- Industry: Private equity real estate
- Founded: 2005; 21 years ago
- Founders: Goodwin Gaw; Kenneth Gaw
- Headquarters: Hong Kong
- AUM: US$33.6 billion (Q3 2022)
- Website: www.gawcapital.com

Gaw Capital (Chinese: 基滙資本) is a real estate private equity fund management firm headquartered in Hong Kong.

In 2022, the firm was ranked by PERE (under Private Equity International) as the 11th largest Private Equity Real Estate firm based on total fundraising over the most recent five-year period.

== Background ==
Gaw Capital was founded in 2005 by Goodwin Gaw and his brother Kenneth Gaw. Their father was Anthony Gaw, the founder of Pioneer Global Group, a listed Hong Kong real estate development company.

The firm's investments span the entire spectrum of real estate sectors, including residential development, offices, retail malls, serviced apartments, hotels, logistics warehouses and IDC projects. In recent years the firm has also invested in Property technology companies such as Beike, SensorFlow and Ziroom.

Gaw Capital is headquartered in Hong Kong with offices in London, Shanghai, Singapore, Seoul, Tokyo, Los Angeles, San Francisco and Seattle.

Previous investments have included Ambassador East, Cityplaza, Columbia Center, InterContinental Hong Kong, Lloyd's building, Novotel Nathan Road Kowloon Hong Kong, Paddington Waterside, Ovation Hollywood, People's Place and The Standard High Line hotel.

== Funds ==
Fund	Vintage Year	Fund Size ($m)
Gateway China Fund I	2005	200
Gateway Capital Real Estate Fund II	2007	800
Gateway Real Estate Fund III	2010	420
Gateway Real Estate IV	2013	1,000
Vietnam Fund	2015	69.8
Gaw Hospitality Fund I	2016	151.3
Gateway Real Estate Fund V	2017	1,300
Gaw Capital European Hospitality Fund I	2018	224.4
Gateway Real Estate Fund VI	2019	2,200
Gaw Growth Equity Fund I	2020	430
Gateway Real Estate Fund VII	2023	3,000

== Controversies ==
=== Email fraud ===
In December 2017, Gaw Capital transferred HK$39 million ($5 million) from a client's bank account to the bank account of a fraudster. The fraudster posed as a client and sent instructions to the firm for the withdrawal of funds. The firm discovered what had happened after the actual client contacted it. A spokesperson for Gaw Capital stated the bank account in question was frozen and most of the funds transferred were retrieved.

=== Lawsuit over The Standard High Line hotel ===
In November 2017, Gaw Capital acquired The Standard High Line hotel in New York for $323 million. In November 2021, Wells Fargo and Apollo Global Management sued Gaw Capital in attempt to foreclose the hotel after the firm failed to make payments on a $170 million loan since May 2020. Gaw Capital stated that the fault lied with Apollo Global Management who refused to accept the firm's settlement offer and put financial greed above all the other parties.
