= Gaw (surname) =

Gaw is a surname with at least four different origins. First, it may be derived from the Gaelic word gall meaning "foreigner" or "stranger". The surnames Gall and Gaul are derived from the same word. In Brittany it became a surname for immigrants from France, in Lincolnshire for Bretons, in Perthshire and Aberdeen for Lowlanders. Second, it may have originated by shortening the name McGaw, which is an Anglicised form of Mag Ádaimh meaning "son of Adam". Third, it may be an old spelling of the German surname Gau, which originated as a toponymic surname; see Gau (territory). Finally, it may be an Anglicisation of the Southern Min pronunciation of the Chinese surname pronounced Wú (吳) in Mandarin; this spelling came into use in Hong Kong by a family of Chinese immigrants from Myanmar.

The surname is relatively rare. There were 334 people on the island of Great Britain and 174 on the island of Ireland with the surname Gaw as of 2011, according to statistics cited by Patrick Hanks.

== People with the surname ==
People with the surname include:

- Anthony Gaw (1941–1999), Hong Kong businessman
- Chippy Gaw (1892–1968), American baseball player
- Elizabeth Eleanor D'Arcy Gaw (1868–1944), Canadian-American metalwork artist
- Esther Allen Gaw (1879–1973), American psychologist
- Frankie Gaw, Taiwanese American cook and author
- Goodwin Gaw (born c. 1968), Hong Kong businessman
- Kenneth Gaw (born 1970), Hong Kong businessman
- S. C. Gaw (1916–1983), Myanmar-born Hong Kong businessman
- Steve Gaw (born 1957), American politician
- William A. Gaw (1891–1973), American painter and academic
