= Gaw =

Gaw or GAW may refer to:

== People ==
- Gaw (surname), a Gaelic-language surname

== Places ==
- Gaw, Myanmar, a town in Thandwe District, Rakhine State
- Gaw Township, a township of Rakhine State

== Other uses ==
- Game & Watch, electronic handheld games produced by Nintendo
- Games Workshop, British miniature wargaming company
- Gauge adjustable wheelset
- GAW Organisation, a Senegalese cultural organization
- Gawler line (timetable code: GAW), Adelaide, Australia
- Global Atmosphere Watch, established by the World Meteorological Organization
- Gustav-Adolf-Werk, a society of the Evangelical Church in Germany
- Nobonob language
