= McGaw (disambiguation) =

McGaw is a surname.

McGaw may also refer to:

- McGaw, Ohio, a community in the United States
- McGaw, Ontario, a ghost town in Ontario, Canada
- McGaw Peak, in West Antarctica
- McGaw Medical Center, an American hospital network
