= Willis Building =

Willis Building may refer to:

- Willis Building, London, a skyscraper in London, England
- Willis Building, Ipswich, a low-rise office building in Ipswich, Suffolk, England
- Willis Tower, a skyscraper in Chicago, Illinois, United States formerly called the Sears Tower
