= Pioneer Global Group =

Kong Kong real estate development company and investor

Pioneer Global Group (SEHK: 224) is a Hong Kong real estate development company and investor, listed on the Hong Kong Stock Exchange, controlled by the Gaw family.

Pioneer Global was founded by Anthony Gaw, and is 21% owned by his widow Rosanna Wang Gaw, 10% by his son Kenneth Gaw, and 1.71% by his daughter Christina Gaw.

The chairman is Rosanna Wang Gaw, the managing director is Kenneth Gaw, the vice chairman is Goodwin Gaw, executive directors are Christina Gaw and Kam Hung Lee.

In 2015, Pioneer Global together with Gateway Capital bought the Intercontinental Hong Kong for US$938 million and planned to spend a further $240 million to renovate it. Pioneer Global also has hotel interests in Thailand.

In January 2017, Pioneer Global sold the 24-storey Pemberton Building in Sheung Wan for HK$1 billion to a British Virgin Islands-registered company said to be controlled by property investment firm Octa Capital Partners, having bought it in 2011 for HK$523 million.
