= Lime Street, London =

Street in the City of London

Coordinates: 51.511834°N 0.083876°W

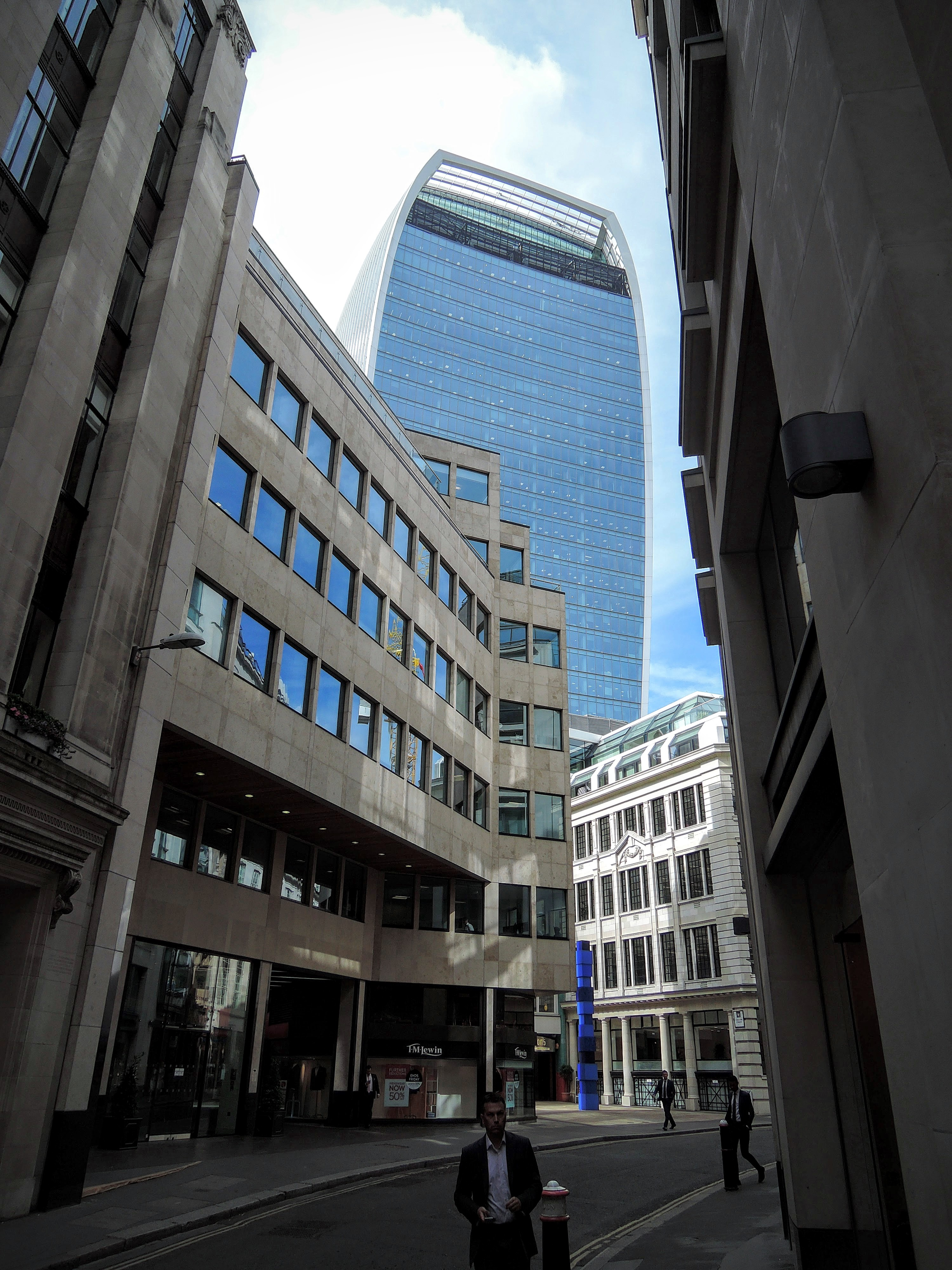
Looking south along Lime Street

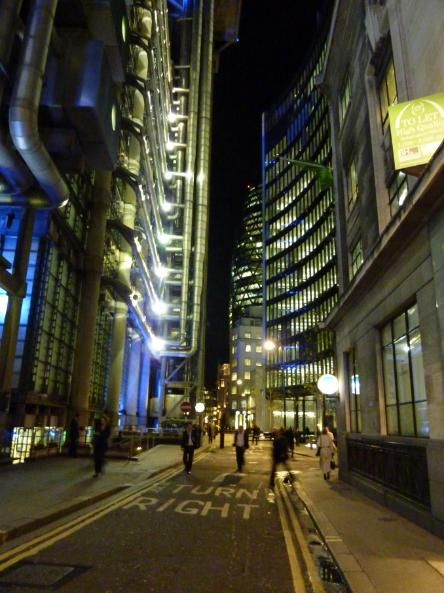
Looking north down Lime Street

Lime Street is a minor road in the City of London between Fenchurch Street to the south and Leadenhall Street to the north. Its name comes from the lime burners who once sold lime from there for use in construction.

It is perhaps best known as the current home of the world's largest insurance market, Lloyd's of London, since its newest building was opened on the street in 1986. Opposite Lloyd's, the Willis Building is the global headquarters of insurance broker Willis. A 35-storey building, The Scalpel, stands at 52-54 Lime Street as the European headquarters of global insurer W. R. Berkley.

The northern portion of the street is pedestrianised. Vehicular through-access to Leadenhall Street is prevented by a firegate, forcing drivers to bear right onto Fenchurch Avenue, from which a left turn onto Billiter Street returns vehicles to Leadenhall Street.

Nearby is the Norman Foster-designed and gherkin-shaped skyscraper 30 St Mary Axe, and the Leadenhall Building. Leadenhall Market is on Lime Street's western side, adjacent to Lloyd's.

According to renowned Dickens scholar M.Morgan, Charles Dickens placed the residence of Ebenezer Scrooge in a now-demolished house on the site of the current Lloyd's building at the corner of Lime and Leadenhall Streets, most likely 28 Lime Street.

The southern portion of the street formed part of the marathon course for the 2012 Olympic Games. The women's marathon took place on 5 August and the men's on 12 August 2012.

The nearest London Underground stations are Monument and Aldgate and the closest mainline railway stations are Liverpool Street, Cannon Street and Fenchurch Street.
