= Syd Cheatle =

Irish writer

Syd Cheatle (6 January 1936 – 22 March 2018) was an Irish architect and writer born in Dublin. His father was Jack Cheatle, who was leader of the RTÉ Concert Orchestra while his mother was Aileen Foley, a cellist from Skibbereen. Syd attended Castleknock College before going to Dublin Institute of Technology to study architecture. After training he left Ireland to start his career as a writer.

After leaving Ireland for London to write, 1970 saw his first two plays, Retreat and The Director produced by the Abbey Theatre in Dublin in 1970. His next play, Straight Up, received its premiere at the Traverse Theatre in Edinburgh and subsequently transferred to the Piccadilly Theatre in London in December 1971. It premiered in the US at the Kansas City playhouse in 1973 with subsequent productions in Seattle, Newhaven, Washington DC and New York City. Straight Up was translated into German by Jurgen and Astrid Fischer and given the German title Im Schoss der Familie. The translation premiered in Germany at the Landestheater Darmstadt in 1972, and was then successful over a 14-year period with German and Austrian major productions in cities such as Berlin, Düsseldorf, Hamburg, Stuttgart and Vienna. Straight Up was premiered in Australia by the Western Australia Theatre Company in Perth.

He also worked as an architect in London with Idea International, he was involved in many high-profile projects all over the world but the most prestigious was probably the Lloyds Building in London but he was growing increasingly homesick. He leased a house on Sherkin Island, County Cork and split his time between London and the island until he moved there permanently in 1989. He threw himself into island life and was advocated on behalf of the community on Sherkin and other island communities for local authorities to support them.

Syd Cheatle died on 22 March 2018 at the age of 82, when he was a resident in a nursing home in Clonakilty. He was survived by his wife Miriam, née Dunne, and his three children Andrew, Juno and Aran. His grave is in Tullagh Cemetery, Baltimore, County Cork.
