= The Scalpel =

Skyscraper on Lime Street in London

Coordinates: 51.513258°N 0.081453°W

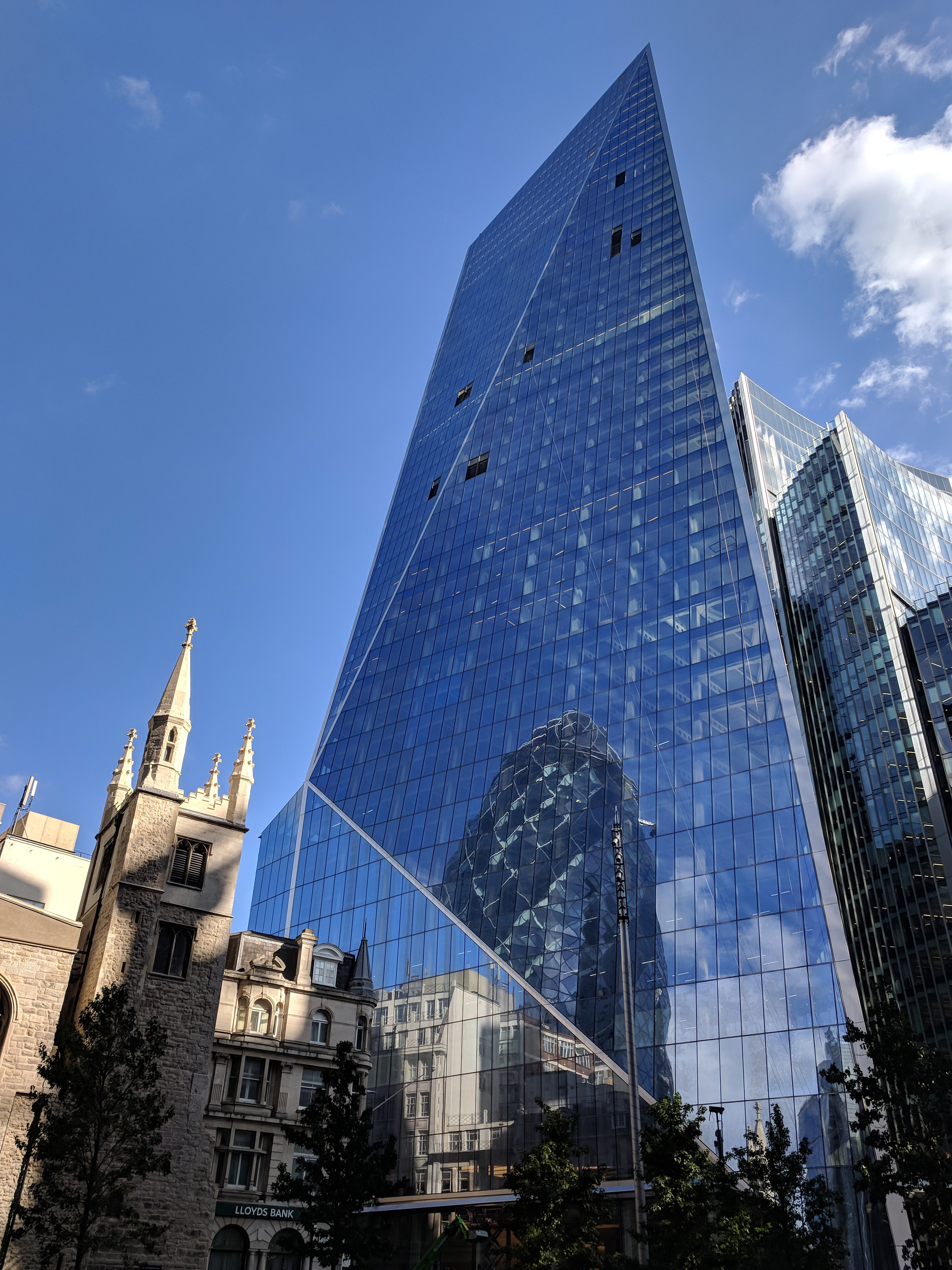
- The Scalpel in August 2018, with the Willis Building to the right, St Andrew Undershaft to the left, and the Gherkin reflected in the windows
- Interactive map of the The Scalpel area

General information
- Status: Completed
- Location: 52 Lime Street, London, EC3; United Kingdom
- Construction started: 2015
- Completed: 2018
- Cost: £500m

Height
- Roof: 190 m (623 ft)

Technical details
- Floor count: 38 (+ 2 basement floors)
- Floor area: Offices: 37,564 square metres (404,300 sq ft); Restaurant: 883 square metres (9,500 sq ft); Retail: 98 square metres (1,100 sq ft)
- Lifts/elevators: 11 TWiN lifts, 2 goods lifts, 2 cycle lifts, 1 firefighting lift and 4 escalators.

Design and construction
- Architect: Kohn Pedersen Fox
- Developer: WRBC Development UK Limited
- Structural engineer: Arup
- Main contractor: Skanska

The Scalpel is a commercial skyscraper in London, United Kingdom. It is located at 52 Lime Street, on its corner with Leadenhall Street, in the City of London financial area. It is opposite the Lloyd's building and adjacent to the Willis Building. Completed in 2018, it is 190 m (620 ft) tall, with 38 storeys, and was designed by Kohn Pedersen Fox.

The "Scalpel" name was originally a nickname but was subsequently designated as its official name, after it was coined by the Financial Times due to the building's distinctive angular design. This follows a trend of nicknaming new buildings based upon their shape; for example, the nearby 122 Leadenhall Street is also known as "The Cheesegrater". The building has also been noted for its similarity to a "play" media button due to how it looks from south of the River Thames.

== Planning ==
WRBC Services Ltd applied to the City of London Corporation for planning permission in September 2012 to demolish Prudential House (52–54 Lime Street and 21–26 Leadenhall Street), Allianz Cornhill House (27-27A Leadenhall Street), and Winterthur House (34–36 Leadenhall Street and 4–5 Billiter Street) and to construct a new building of 38 storeys comprising office and retail uses.

On 15 January 2013, the City of London Planning and Transportation Committee recommended that planning permission be granted for the application. On 11 June 2013, the Common Council of the City of London permitted the development to go ahead subject to certain conditions being met.

== Construction ==
The construction of the tower first required the demolition of three existing buildings on the 0.33 ha (0.82 acres) site. The building at 38 Leadenhall Street (on the corner of Billiter Street) was not demolished, despite being within the block that the tower occupies.

Skanska were appointed as the main building contractor. In October 2013, the developers informed the Corporation of London that the project would commence on 23 November 2013.

== Use ==
The skyscraper was built for insurance company W. R. Berkley and is the firm's European headquarters, occupying approximately one-quarter of the total office space. Other tenants that have leased space include AXIS Capital, National Australia Bank, SAP, Morrison & Foerster, Britannia Financial Group, Convex and Chaucer Group.

== Gallery ==
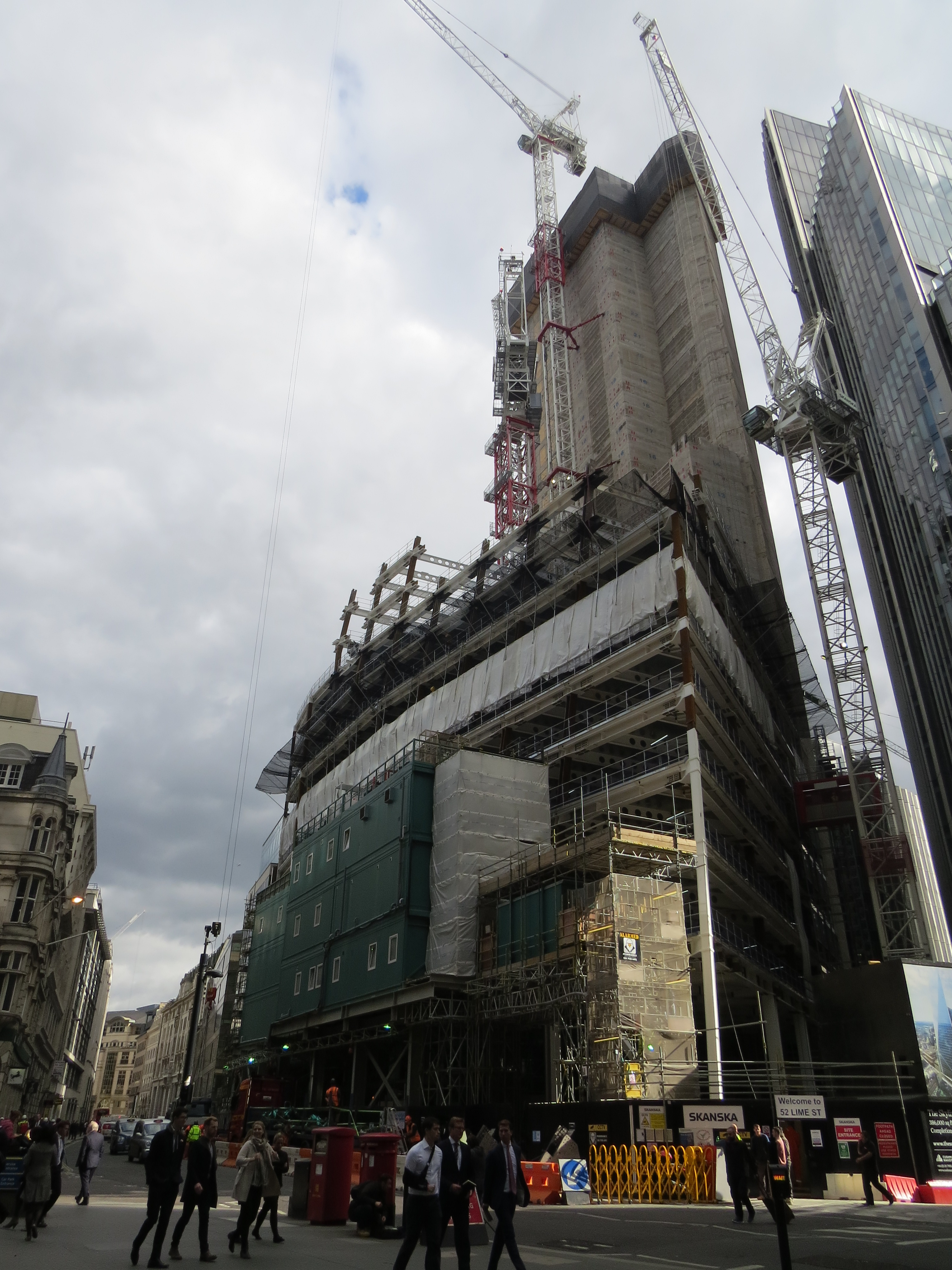
The Scalpel construction site, October 2016

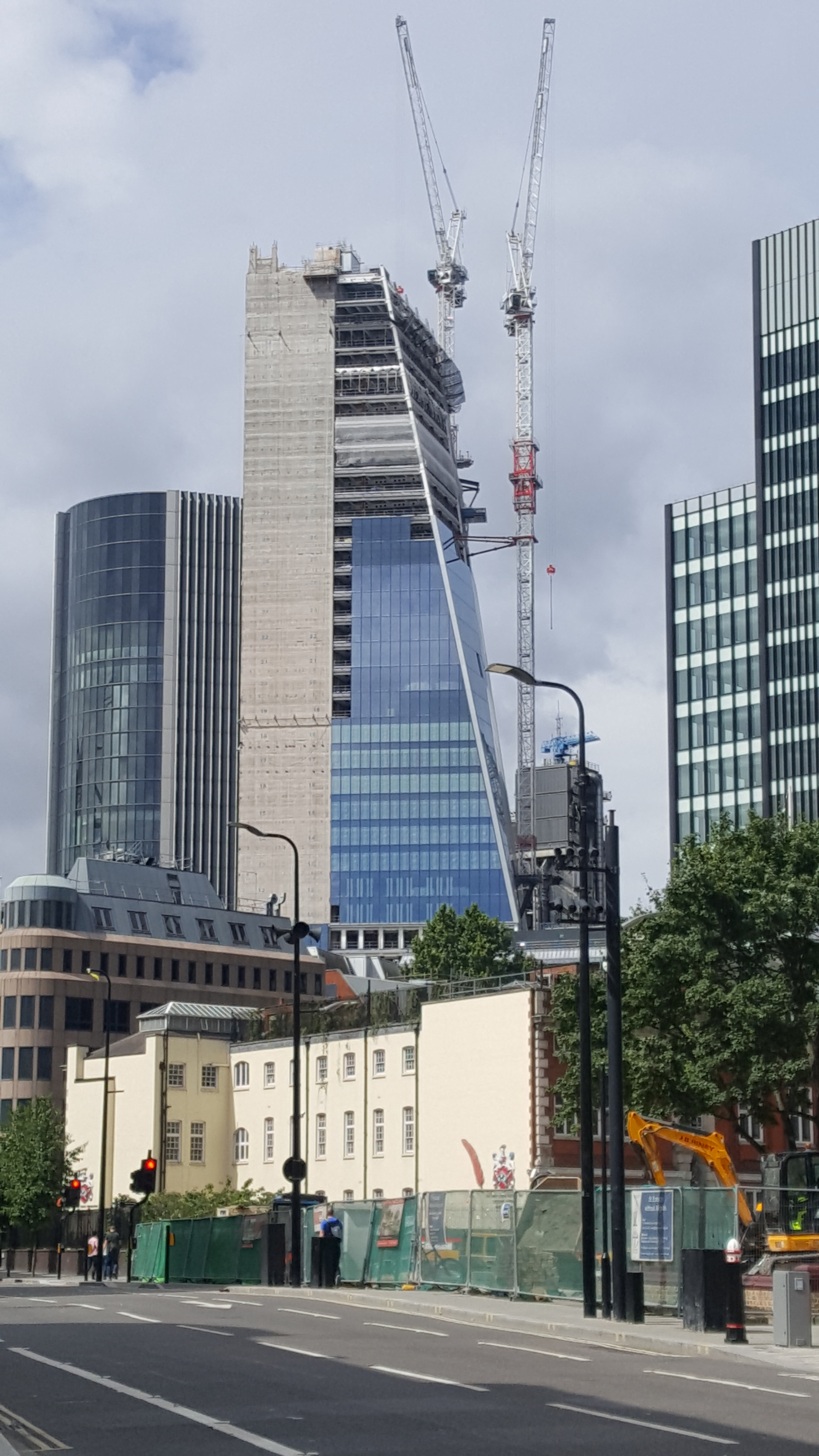
The Scalpel construction site, July 2017

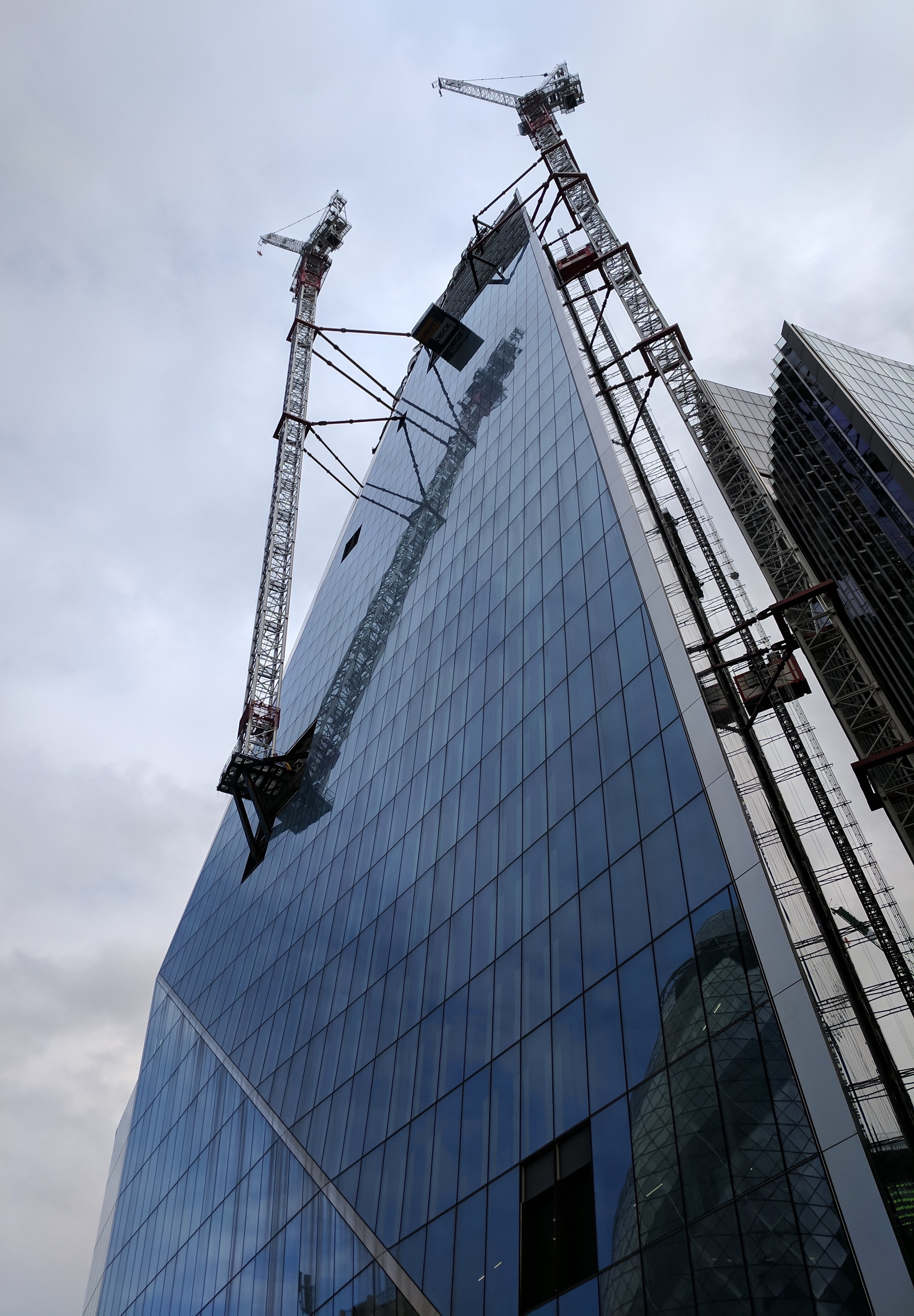
The Scalpel construction site, September 2017

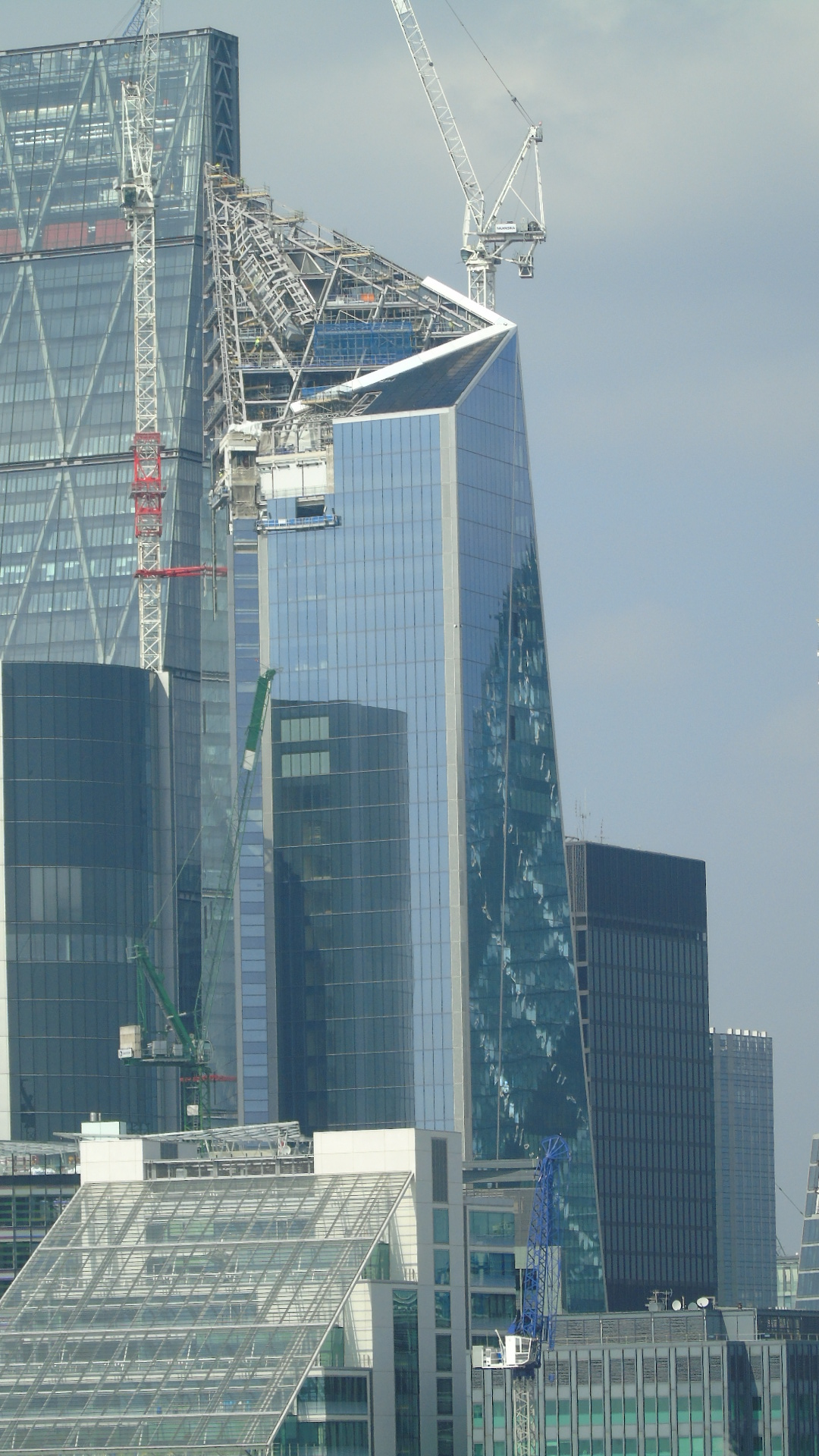
The Scalpel construction site, April 2018

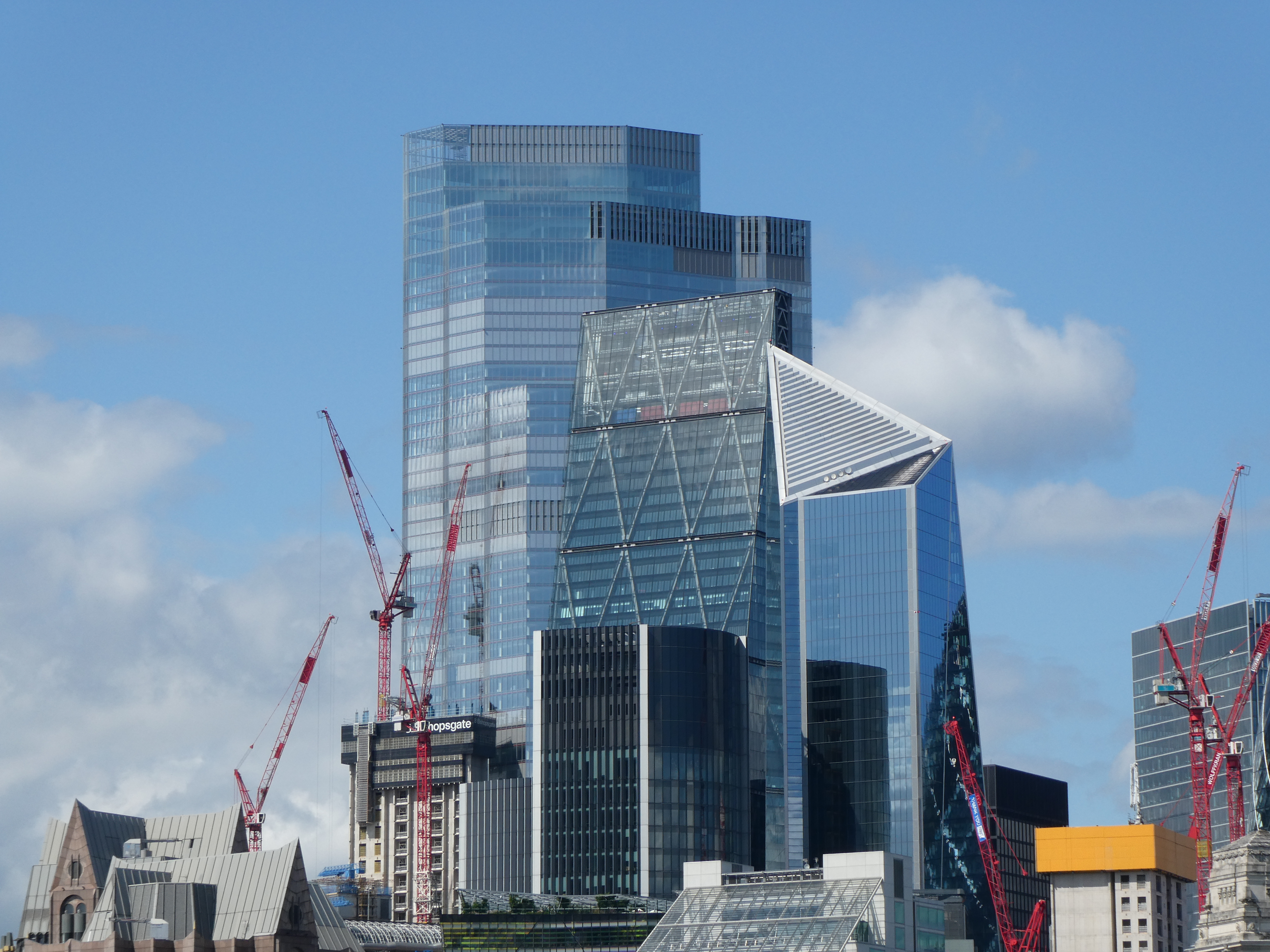
Resembling a 'play' button when seen from across the river Thames, 2021

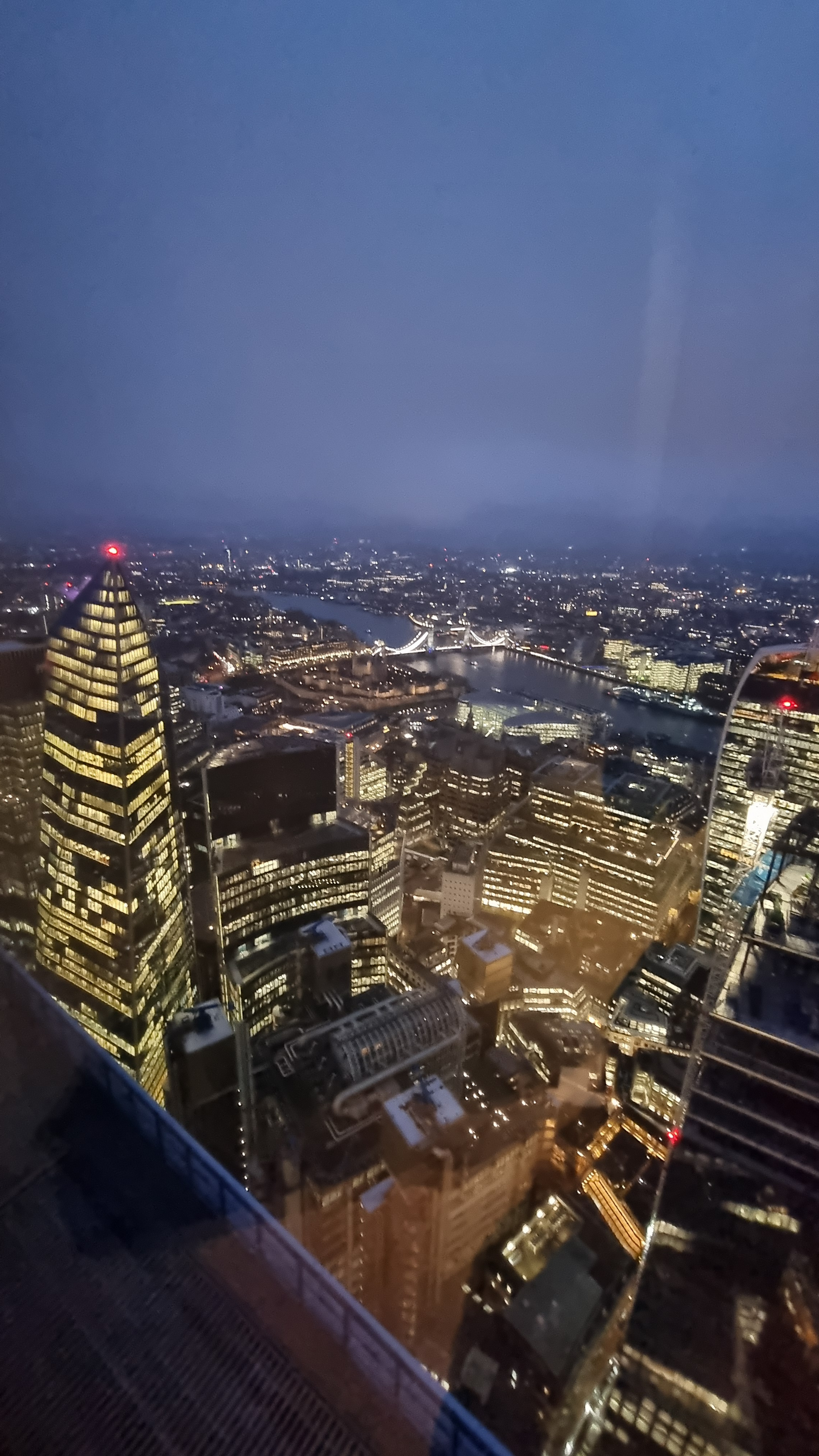
Southeastern view from 50th floor of 8 Bishopsgate showing Scalpel (left) - February 2024

== See also ==
- List of tallest buildings and structures in London
- City of London landmarks
- St Andrew Undershaft, the church opposite on Leadenhall Street
