= The Standard, High Line =

Hotel in Manhattan, New York

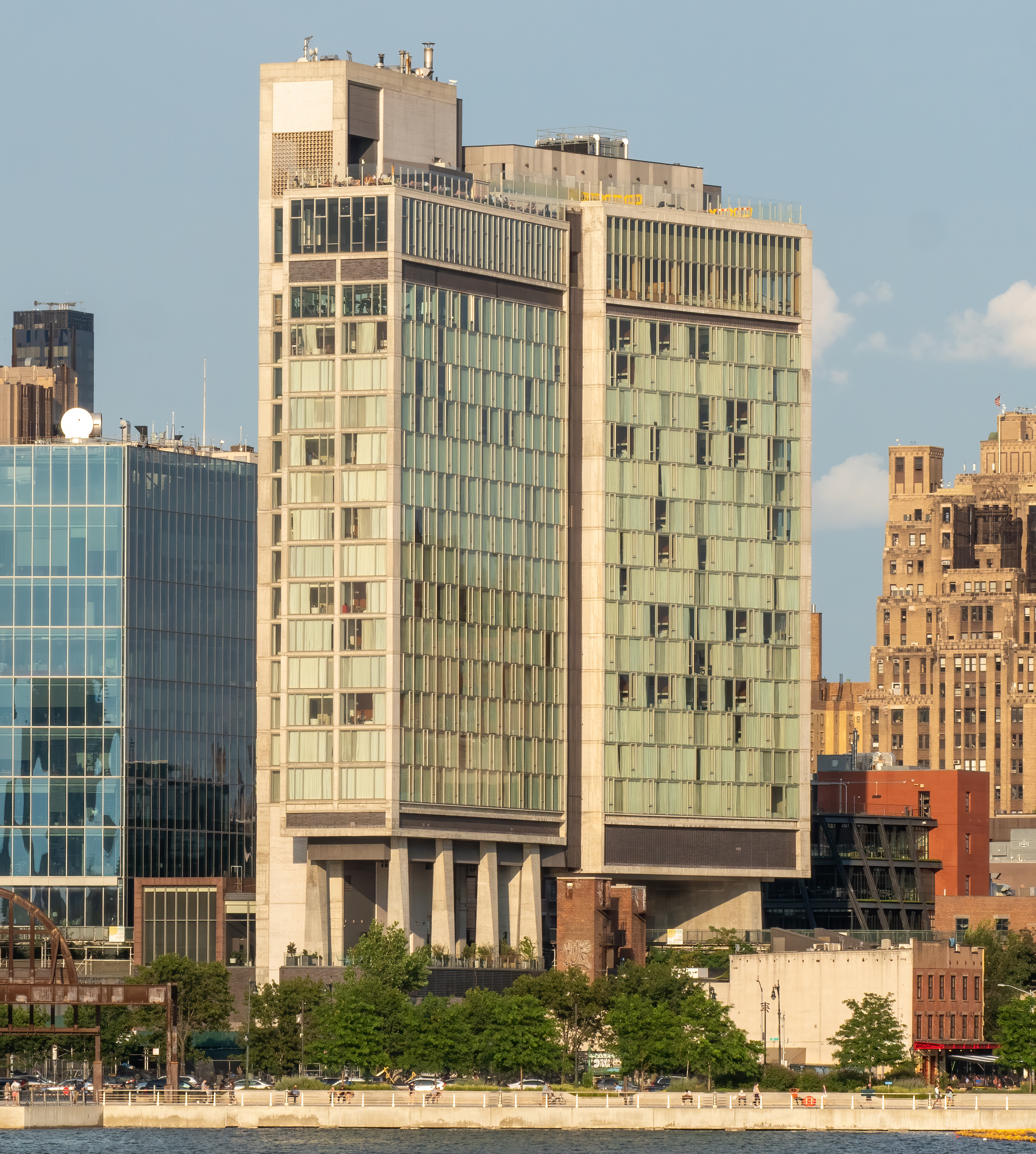
- The Standard, High Line seen from the Hudson River in 2021

General information
- Location: 848 Washington Street; Manhattan, New York City, U.S.
- Coordinates: 40°44′27″N 74°00′29″W
- Owner: Gaw Capital

Design and construction
- Architect: Ennead Architects
- Structural engineer: DeSimone Consulting Engineers

The Standard, High Line, formerly The Standard, is an 18-story luxury boutique hotel located at 848 Washington Street between West 13th and Little West 12th streets in the Meatpacking District of Manhattan, New York City. It stands 261 feet (80 m) above street level, above the High Line, a former elevated railroad track reconstructed into a linear park. The hotel, which has 338 guest rooms, was designed by the architects Ennead Architects (formerly Polshek Partnership) and was completed in 2009. Architype Review, an online architecture publication, heralded the hotel as being "straightforward, [and] thoughtfully conceived, [something] that is all too rare in the City today."

== History ==
Hotelier André Balazs commissioned the building of the Standard. Although he owns a chain of hotels, this was the first he has actually built from the ground up. The hotel is located within the Meatpacking District. Most of the area is occupied by two-story 19th and 20th century manufacturing lofts and industrial buildings which were once predominantly occupied by meat packers and butchers, but which now house restaurants, boutiques and high-end retailers. The clients and architects wanted the hotel to "reflect the historic feel of the neighborhood." Josephine Minutillo, a critic for Architectural Record noted, "the Standard is sleek and gritty at the same time, echoing its Meatpacking District neighborhood, where high-end fashion showrooms and pricey art galleries have supplanted bloody butcher shops and no-frills warehouses."

== Design ==
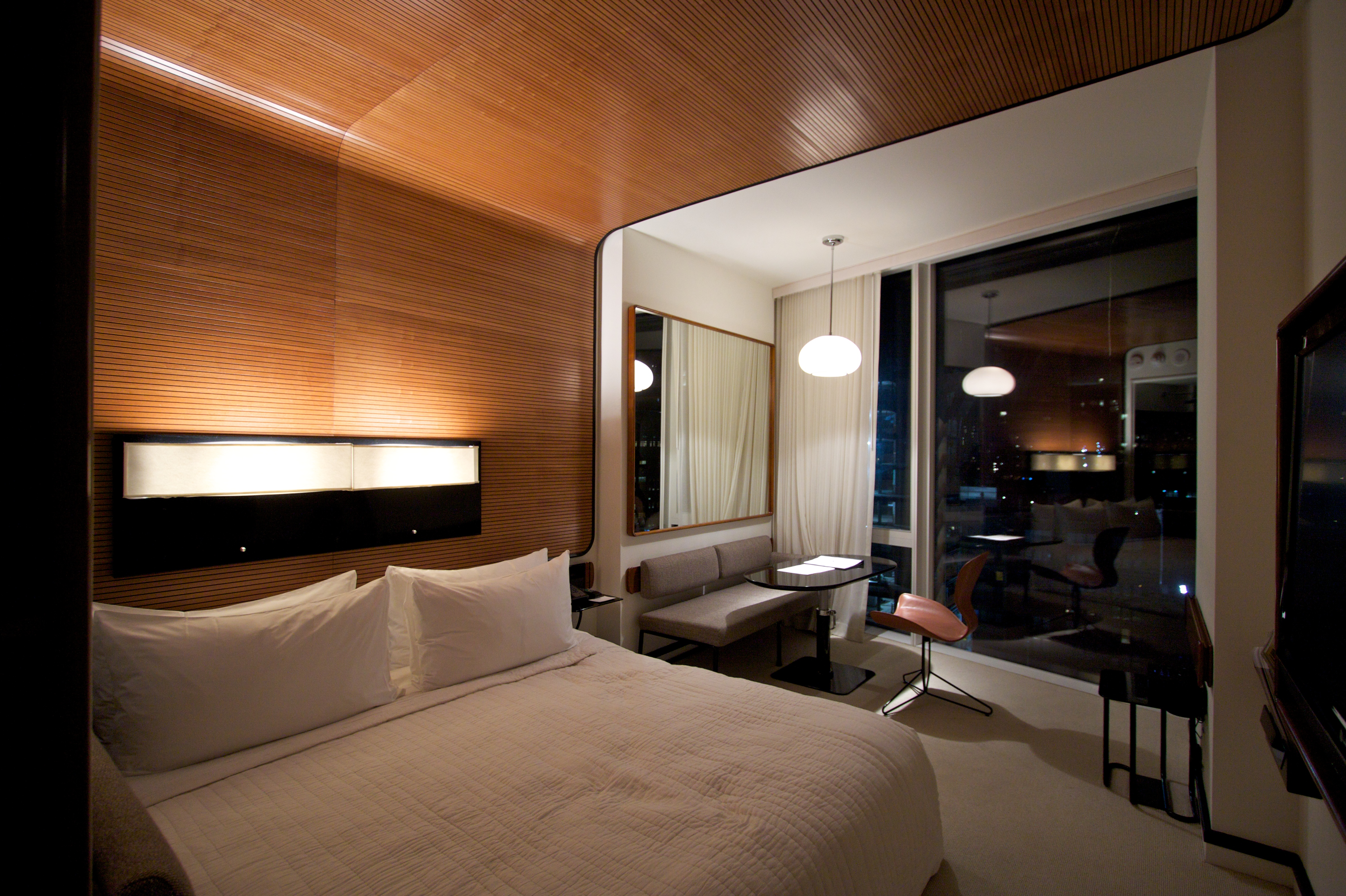
Room in the hotel.

The hotel is raised 57 feet (17 m) above street level on pilotis, five massive sculptural piers, which hoist the building thirty feet over the park below. On the east side of the structure "[a] single, sloped concrete pier, along which a tantalizing set of fire stairs runs, supports the building by the hotel entrance." The elevation of this structure is one clear distinction from the orthogonal street grid of Manhattan. Another was hinging the two concrete slabs which make up the structure. The hinge technique was not only a stylistic choice but also a functional one. Because of the angle of the two slabs all 338 guest rooms have unobstructed views of Manhattan: the New York City skyline, the Hudson River or the Empire State Building. Balazs explains the choice for hinging the slabs as such: "It [allowed] us to squeeze in an extra room per floor, but more significantly, it provides a variety of view corridors while retaining as many views as possible of the Empire State Building."

The two prevalent materials used were concrete and glass. Two techniques of concrete pouring were used, pour-in-place and board form. The grid of the concrete serves as a frame for the water-white glass. The combination of the two materials creates a curtain wall for the façade of the structure. Architype Review notes that, "the juxtaposition of the building’s two materials…reflects the character of New York City: the gritty quality of the concrete contrasts with the refinement of the glass."

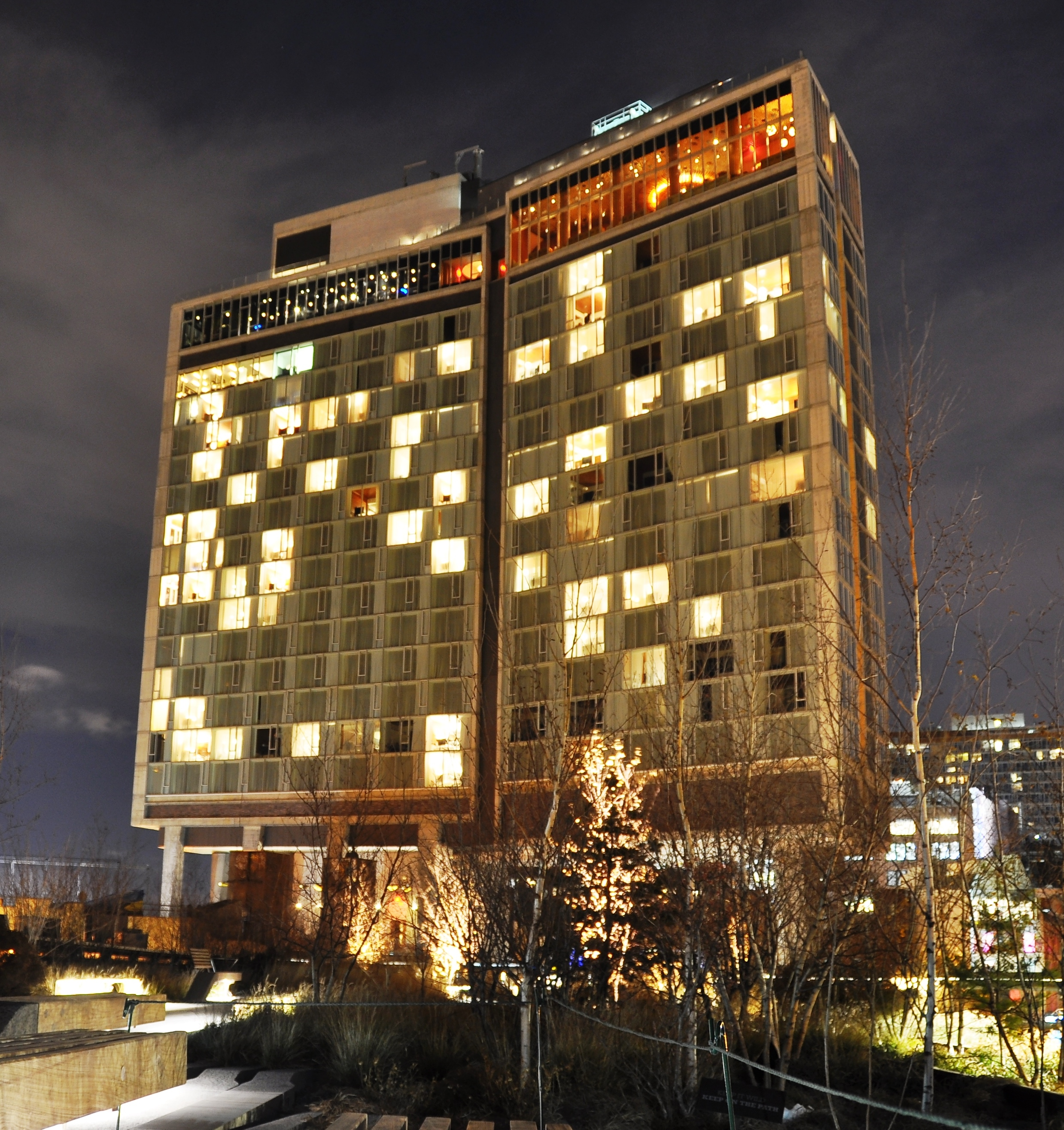
View from the High Line

=== Architectural style ===
The style of the building is best related to the architectural vocabulary defined by Le Corbusier. There are numerous references to his style of building, from the use of the pilotis, to the incorporation of public space, the use of a glass curtain wall façade, and the utilization of the rooftop, which now houses a bar called Le Bain. These features also speak to the principles of the International Style. Joseph Minutillo notes that some of the references to Corbusier were intentional, while others may not have been. For example, "an elevated pedestrian zone slicing through the building [is] reminiscent of Le Corbusier’s multistreet-level designs for La Ville Radieuse."

=== Ground-level public plazas ===
One of the client's objectives was to "create a living room for the neighborhood," essentially to create a space where local members of the community as well as hotel guests could gather, and co-mingle. To this end, the street level of the Standard is an expansive outdoor plaza where guests of the hotel as well as the general public can sit and enjoy food from the Standard's restaurant, The Standard Grill, or beer from The Standards Biergarten. The outdoor plaza is situated partly underneath the Highline, so the preexisting railroad tracks lie overhead. Because of the exposed elevated railroad tracks and the client's stress on keeping with the historical feel of the Meatpacking District, numerous stylistic and design features were implemented. The façade of the entire restaurant is composed of reclaimed brick, very similar to the style of brick found in most other areas in the neighborhood. The architects also decided to hang metal canopies and use steel frame windows; these two architectural forms are commonly seen at meatpacking plants and other warehouses in this area. These stylistic choices allow this newly constructed building to keep with the historical feel of the Meatpacking District.

== Elevator incident ==
On May 12, 2014, video footage was broadcast by the TMZ television program of Solange Knowles, sister of Beyoncé, physically assaulting her brother-in-law, hip-hop mogul Jay-Z in an elevator in the hotel. The video spread quickly across the Internet and became an Internet meme.
