= McGaw =

McGaw is a surname. Notable people with the surname include:

- Alfred McGaw (1900–1984), English cricketer and British Army officer
- Charles A. McGaw (1846–1926), American politician
- Foster G. McGaw (1897–1986), American philanthropist
- Jack McGaw (1936–2012), Canadian journalist
- Leland McGaw (1927–2017), Canadian politician
- Mark McGaw (born 1964), Australian rugby league player
- Patrick McGaw (born 1967), American actor
- Ray McGaw (1937–2001), Australian rules footballer
- Samuel McGaw (1838–1878), Scottish Victoria Cross recipient
- Walt McGaw (1899–?), American footballer
- Wes McGaw (1951–1981), Australian rules footballer

== See also ==
- Gaw (surname)
