= Kenneth Gaw =

Hong Kong businessman

- Born: September 1970 (age 55); Bangkok, Thailand
- Education: Brown University
- Occupation: Businessman
- Title: Managing director, Pioneer Global Group and Gaw Capital Partners
- Spouse: Patricia Gaw
- Children: 3
- Parent: Anthony Gaw
- Relatives: Goodwin Gaw (brother)

Kenneth Gaw (born September 1970) is a Hong Kong businessman, and the co-founder and managing director of Gaw Capital Partners.

== Early life ==
Gaw was born in September 1970 to Anthony Gaw and Rosanna Wang in Bangkok, Thailand, and grew up in Hong Kong.

== Education ==
Gaw has a bachelor's degree in applied mathematics and economics from Brown University, graduating in 1992.

== Career ==
After graduating in 1992, Gaw worked for Goldman Sachs in New York.

In 1994, Gaw joined Pioneer Global Group, a publicly listed company on the Hong Kong Stock Exchange involved in property investment and development, which was founded by his late father and chaired by his mother. Under his leadership, the company restructured its operations, leading to the partial privatization of its banking and shipping assets, as well as its US real estate portfolio.

Gaw is the managing director of Pioneer Global Group. Gaw owns 10% of Pioneer Global.

Gaw is the president and managing principal of Gaw Capital Partners, which he co-founded with his two siblings, and has more than US$33 billion of assets under management. He is also a director of Dusit Thani, Home Inns and the Hong Kong Thailand Business Council.

In 2015, the Gaw family had an estimated net worth of US$1.5 billion.

== Personal life ==
Kenneth Gaw and his wife, Patricia, have three sons. He was awarded “Outstanding Entrepreneur” by Capital Entrepreneur in 2017.
