= Willis Building, London =

Skyscraper in the City of London

Willis Building
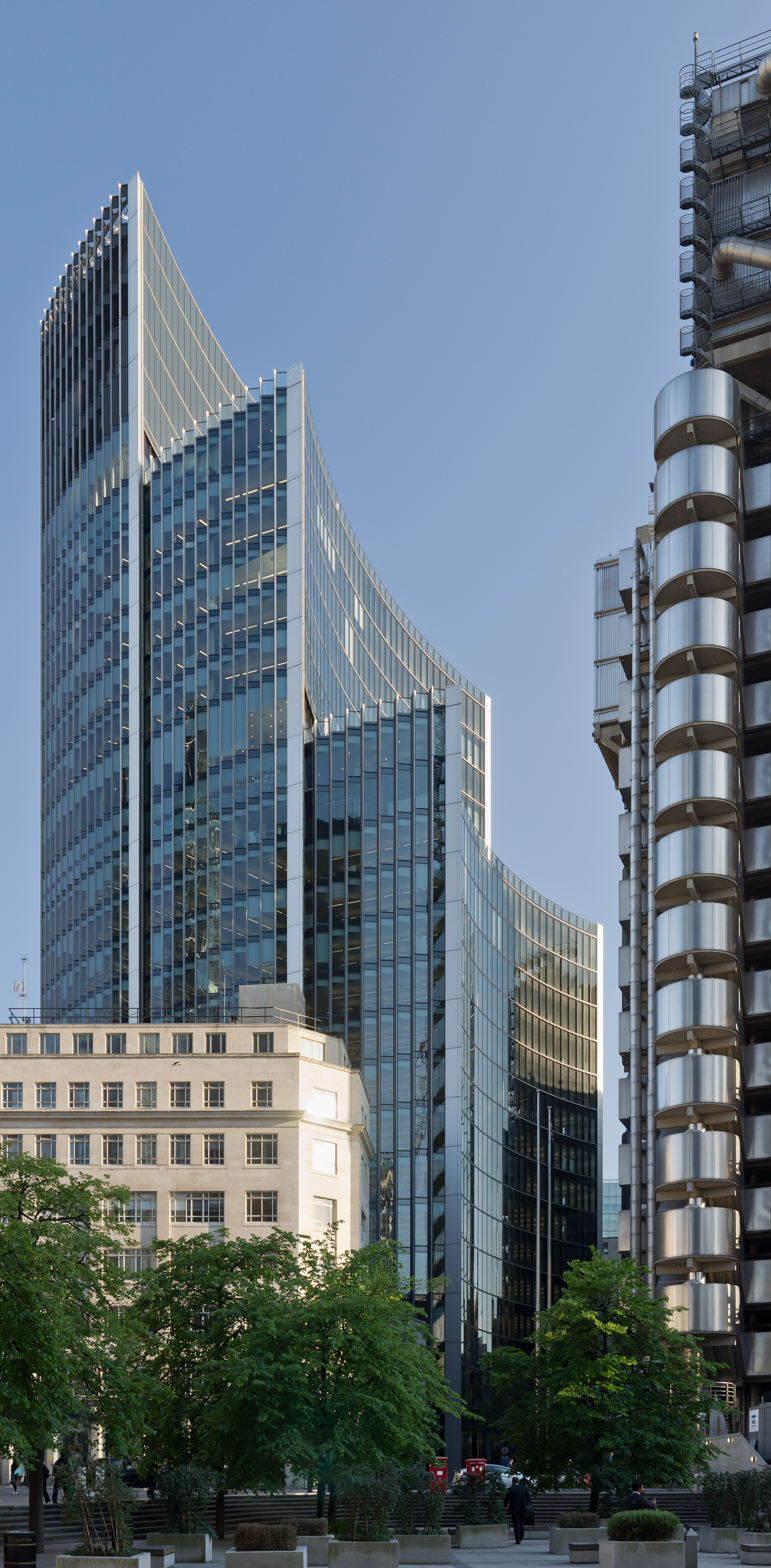
- The Willis Building, City of London
- Interactive map of the Willis Building area

General information
- Location: London, EC3; United Kingdom
- Coordinates: 51.5129°N 0.0815°W
- Construction started: 2004
- Completed: 2008; 18 years ago

Height
- Roof: 125 metres (410 ft)

Technical details
- Floor count: 26
- Floor area: 50,107 m^{2} (539,350 sq ft)

Design and construction
- Architect: Norman Foster
- Structural engineer: Ramboll
- Main contractor: Mace

The Willis Building is a commercial skyscraper at 51 Lime Street in the City of London. Designed by Norman Foster and developed by British Land, it stands opposite the Lloyd's building and rises to 125 metres (410 ft), with a tiered, stepped profile. The building was completed in 2008.

Most of the office accommodation was pre-let to the insurance broker Willis Group (now Willis Towers Watson). The building provides around 50,107 m^{2} (539,347 sq ft) gross floor area, of which approximately 475,000 square feet (44,129 m^{2}) was let to Willis.

== History ==
The Willis Building was constructed between 2004 and 2008 under the management of Mace and represented a significant addition to the City of London skyline at the time, becoming its fourth-tallest building after Tower 42, 30 St Mary Axe and CityPoint. The core was topped out in July 2006 and the steelwork completed in September that year. Cladding began in July 2006 and the structure was externally completed by June 2007. It was internally fitted out and officially opened in April 2008.

The building was the first in a wave of new tall towers for London's primary financial district. Others included 22 Bishopsgate, the Leadenhall Building and the Heron Tower.

== History ==
The Willis Building was constructed between 2004 and 2008 under construction management by Mace, following British Land’s appointment of Mace in June 2004. The core topped out in July 2006, after which the superstructure progressed rapidly. At completion in May 2008, the building was the fourth-tallest in the City of London, after Tower 42, 30 St Mary Axe and CityPoint. The building has an all-steel superstructure with William Hare as steelwork contractor.

== Gallery ==
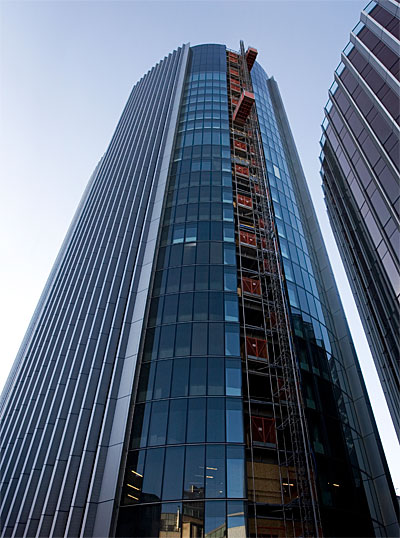
The Willis Building exterior nears completion (May 2007)

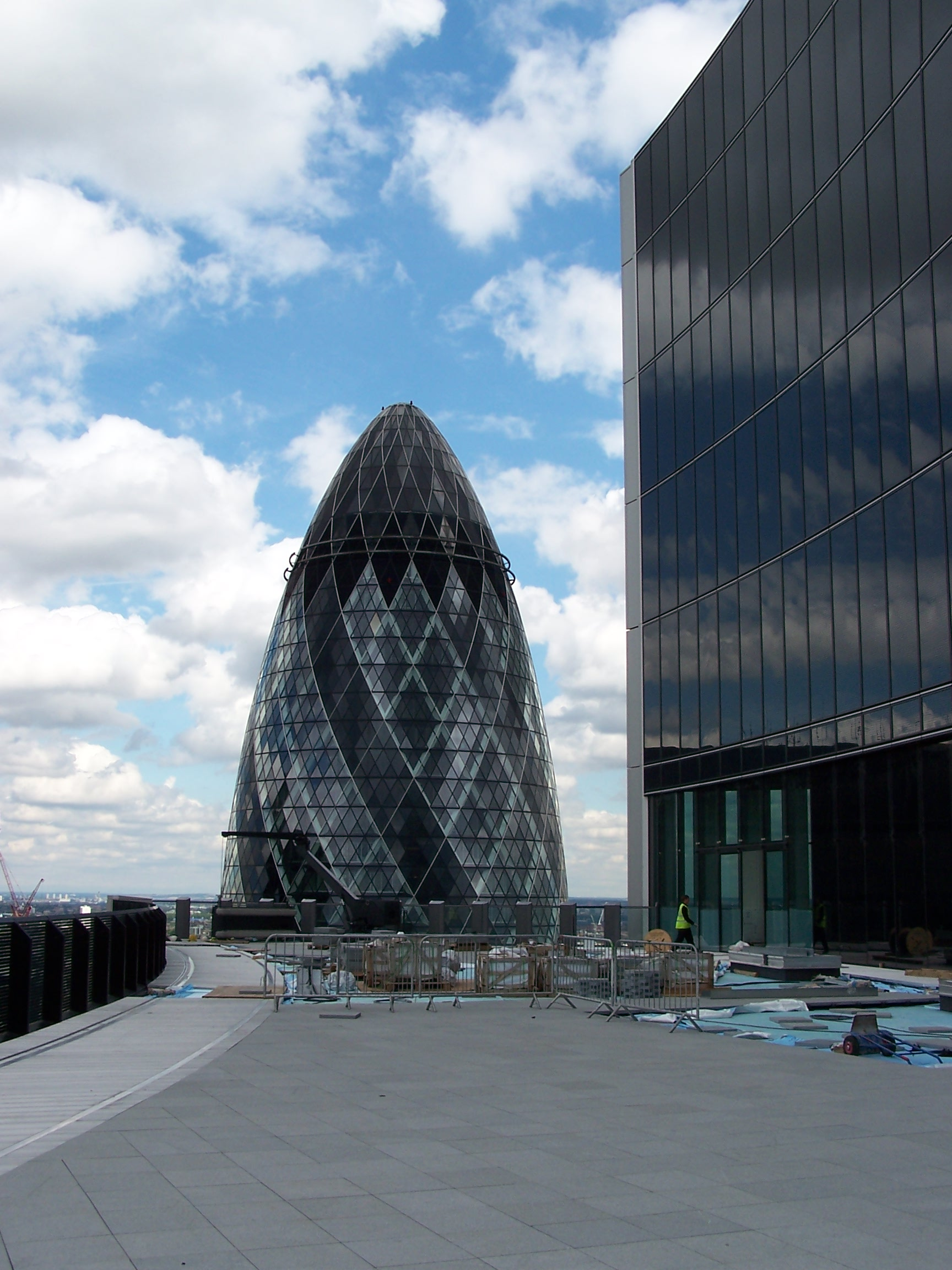
30 St Mary Axe as viewed from the second "step" of the Willis Building (July 2007)

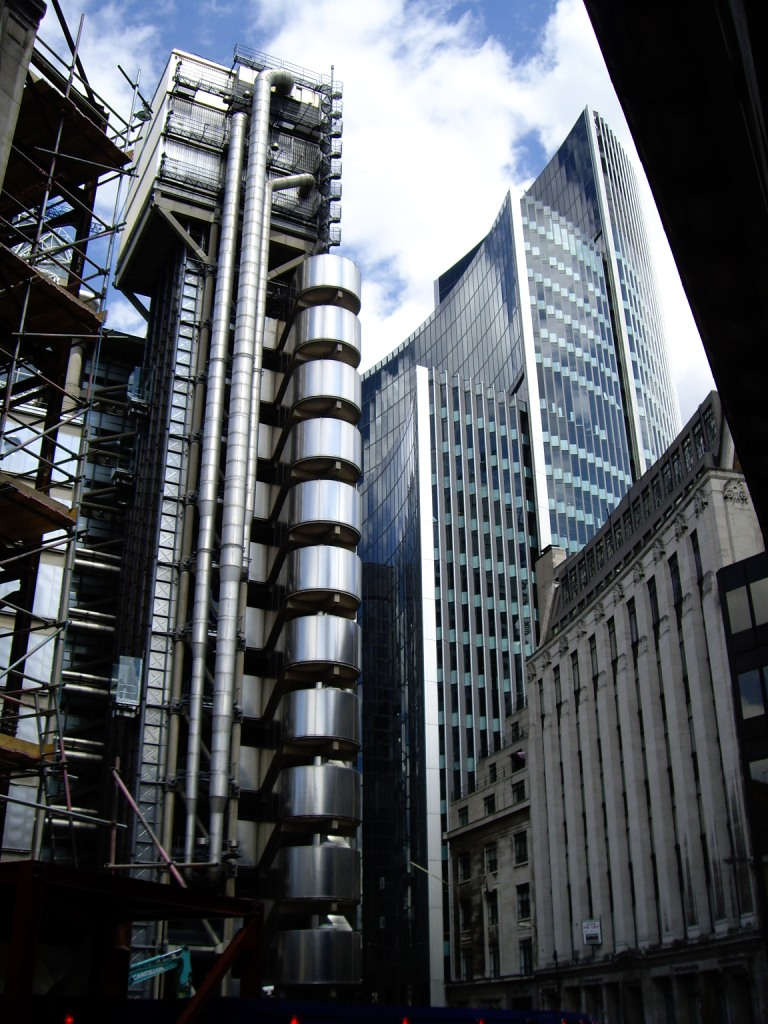
The Lloyd's building is flanked by the Willis Building, as viewed from Lime Street (July 2007)

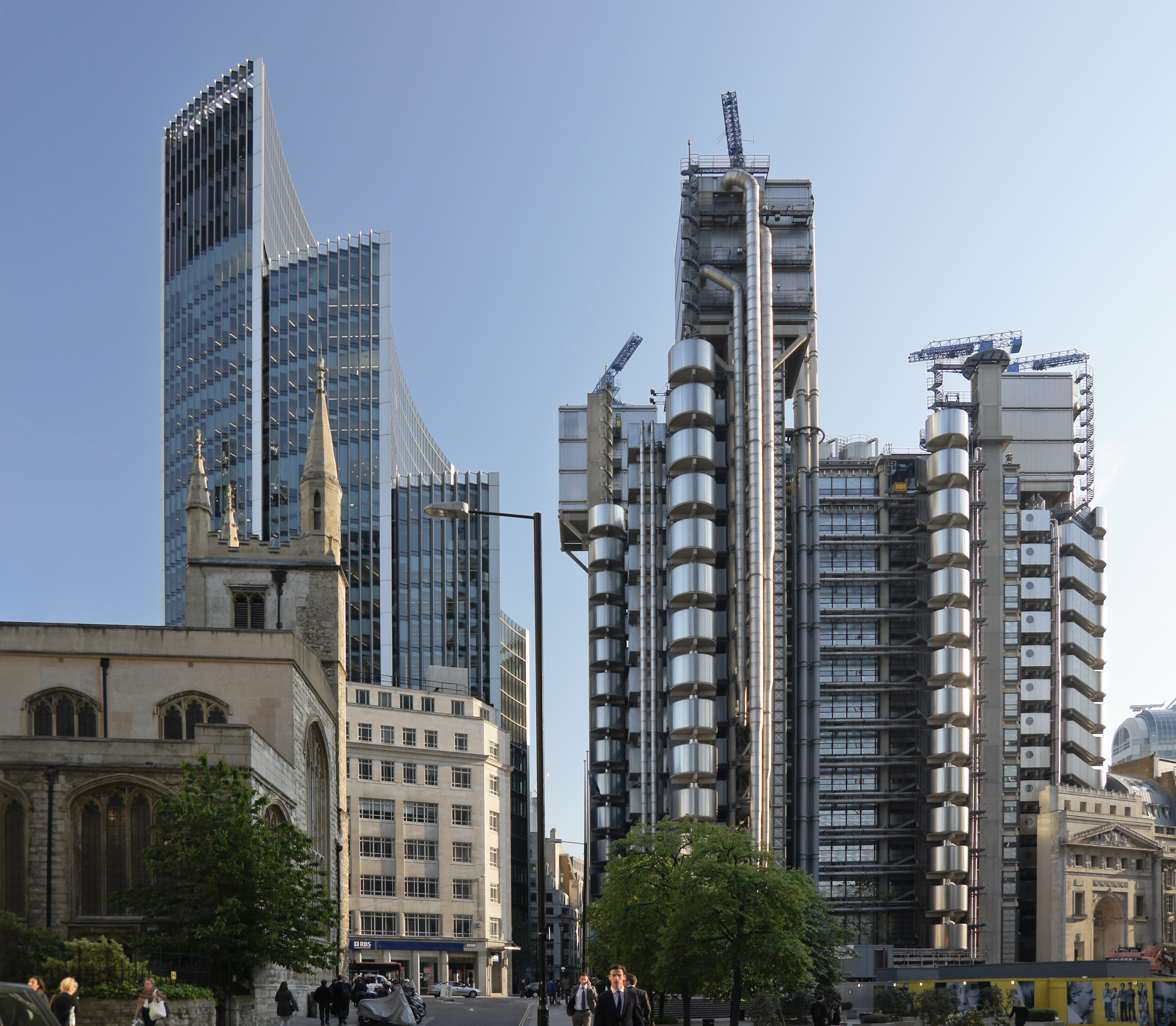
The Willis and Lloyd's buildings, as viewed from St. Mary Axe (May 2011)

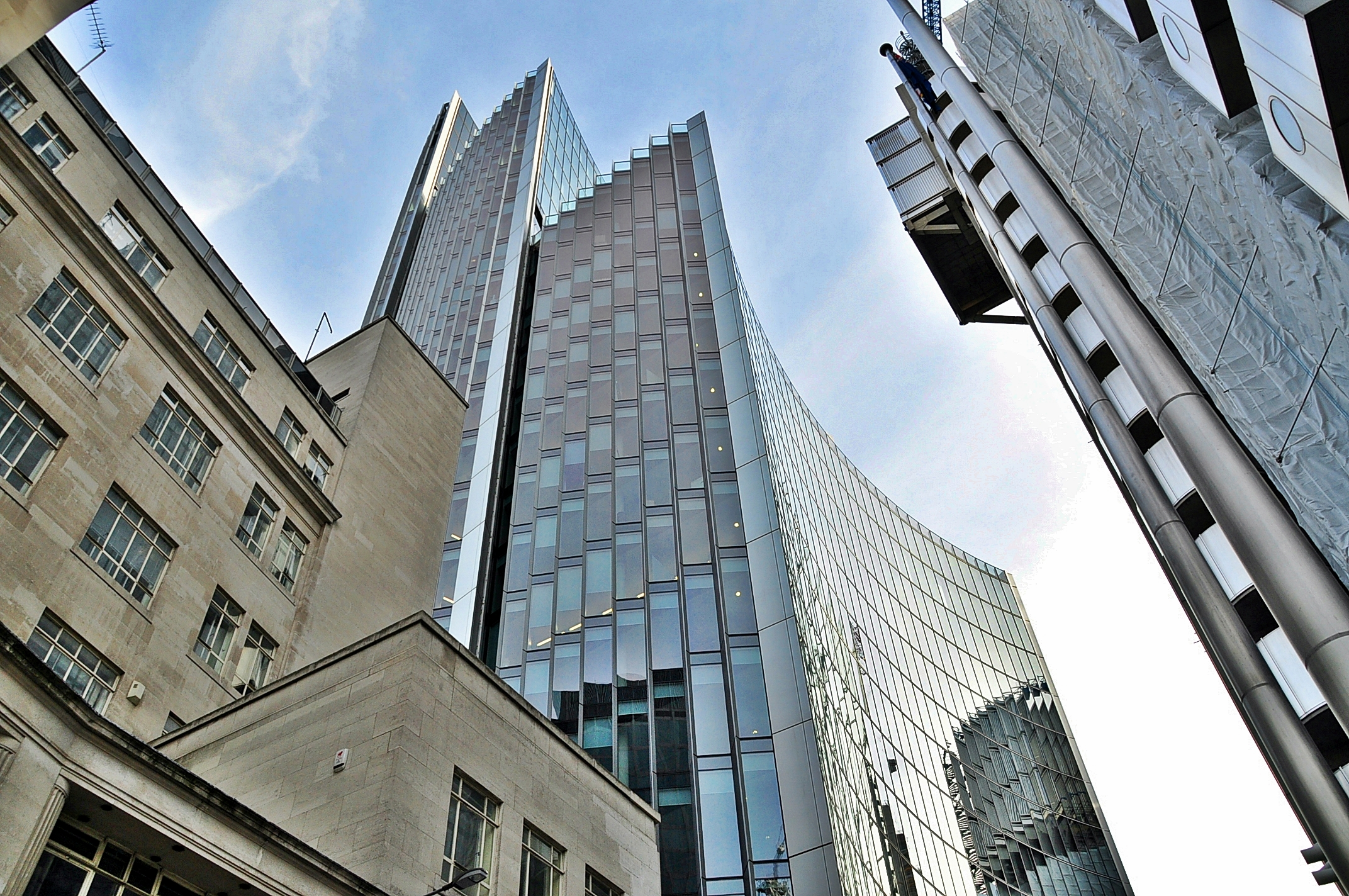
Willis Building, 2012

== See also ==
- List of tallest buildings and structures in London
- 20 Fenchurch Street
- The Scalpel
- St. Helen's
- Willis Tower
