= Lloyd's building =

Building by Richard Rogers in London

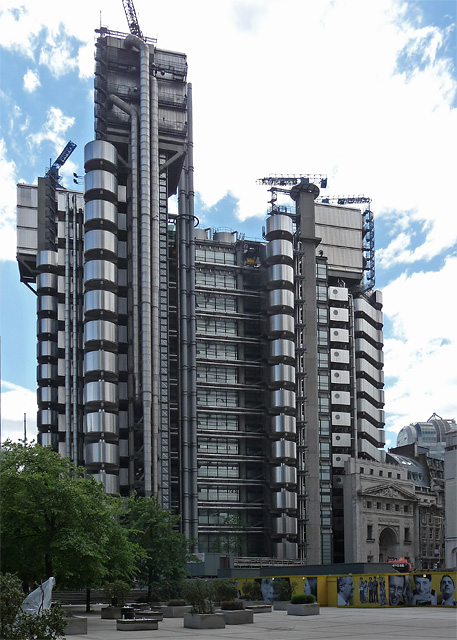
- Lloyd's building in 2011, with the preserved entrance from the 1928 building visible on the right.

General information
- Type: Office building
- Architectural style: Hi-Tech Architecture
- Location: Lime Street, London
- Coordinates: 51°30′47″N 0°04′56.5″W
- Construction started: 1978; 48 years ago
- Completed: 1986; 40 years ago
- Cost: £75 million
- Owner: Ping An Insurance

Height
- Antenna spire: 95.1 m (312 ft)
- Roof: 88 m (289 ft)

Technical details
- Floor count: 14
- Lifts/elevators: 14 (12 external, 2 internal)

Design and construction
- Architecture firm: Richard Rogers & Partners; Project Architects: Richard Rogers; Graham Stirk; Ivan Harbour; Syd Cheatle; Chris Wilkinson; John McAslan; Peter St John
- Structural engineer: Arup; Peter Rice
- Services engineer: Arup
- Main contractor: Bovis

Listed Building – Grade I
- Official name: Lloyd's building
- Designated: 19 December 2011
- Reference no.: 1405493

The Lloyd's building (sometimes known as the Inside-Out Building) is the home of the insurance institution Lloyd's of London. It is located on the former site of East India House on the corner of Lime Street and Leadenhall Street, in London's main financial district, the City of London. The building is a leading example of radical Bowellism architecture in which the services for the building, such as ducts and lifts, are located on the exterior to maximise space in the interior.

In 2011, twenty-five years after its completion in 1986 the building received Grade I listing; at this time it was the youngest structure ever to obtain this status. It is said by Historic England to be "universally recognised as one of the key buildings of the modern epoch". Its innovation of having key service pipes and other components routed outside the walls has led to very expensive maintenance costs due to their exposure to the elements.

== History ==
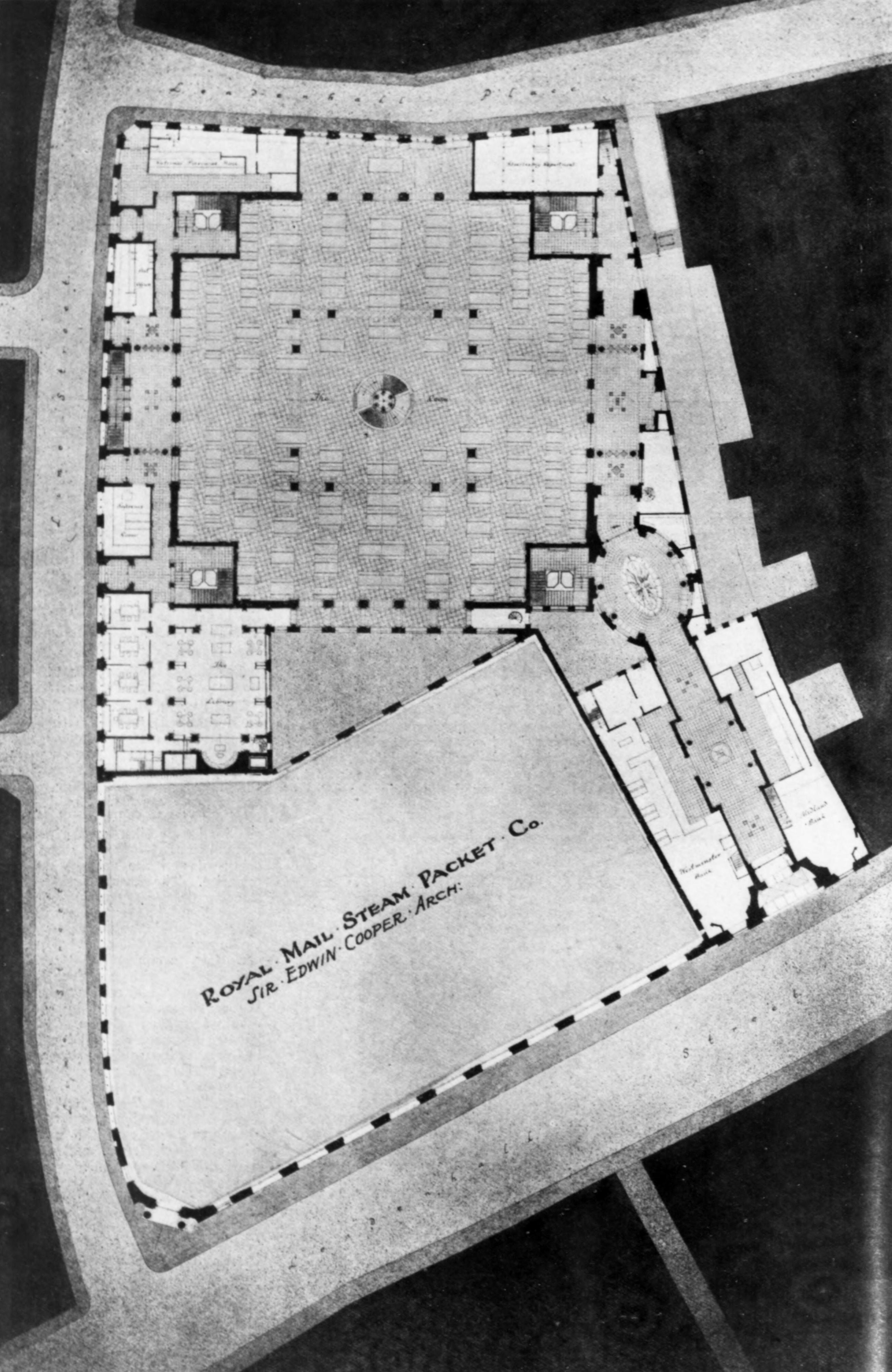
Floor plan of Sir Edwin Cooper's 1928 building. Only the main entrance on Leadenhall was retained in the new building.

The first Lloyd's building (address 12 Leadenhall Street) had been built on this site in 1928 to the design of Sir Edwin Cooper. In 1958, due to expansion of the market, a new building was constructed across the road at 51 Lime Street (now the site of the Willis Building). Lloyd's now occupied the Heysham Building and the Cooper Building.

By the 1970s Lloyd's had again outgrown these two buildings and proposed to extend the Cooper Building. In 1978, the corporation ran an architectural competition which attracted designs from practices such as Foster Associates, Arup and Ioeh Ming Pei. Lloyd's commissioned Richard Rogers to redevelop the site, and the original 1928 building on the western corner of Lime and Leadenhall Streets was demolished to make way for the present one, which was officially opened by Queen Elizabeth II on 18 November 1986. The 1928 building's entrance at 12 Leadenhall Street was preserved and forms a rather incongruous attachment to the 1986 structure. Demolition of the 1958 building commenced in 2004 to make way for the 26-storey Willis Building.

The building was previously owned by Dublin based real estate firm Shelbourne Development Group, who purchased it in 2004 from a German investment bank. In July 2013 it was sold to the Chinese company Ping An Insurance in a £260 million deal.

In 2008 the Twentieth Century Society called for the building to be Grade I listed and in 2011 it was granted this status.

== Design ==
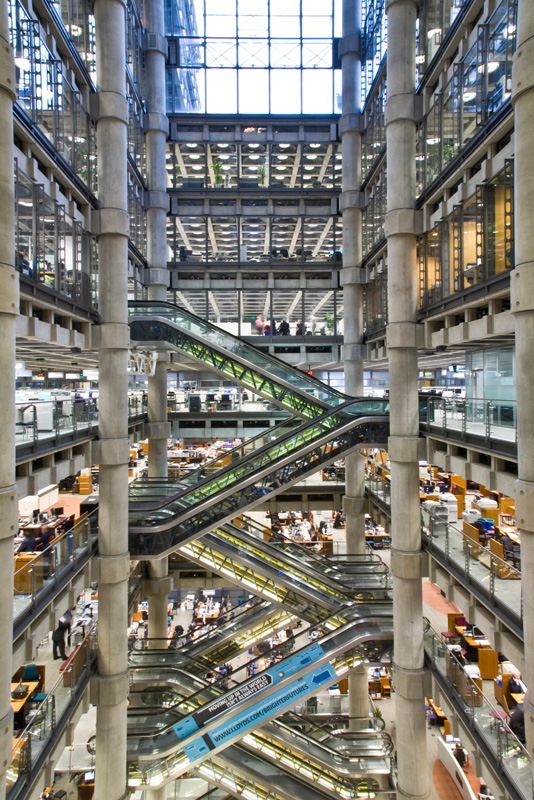
Inside the Lloyd's building

=== Features ===
The current Lloyd's building (address 1 Lime Street) was designed by the architect company Richard Rogers & Partners and built between 1978 and 1986. Bovis was the management contractor. Like the Pompidou Centre in Paris (designed by Renzo Piano and Rogers), the building was innovative in having its services such as staircases, lifts, ductwork, electrical power conduits and water pipes on the outside, leaving an uncluttered space inside. The 12 glass lifts were the first of their kind in the United Kingdom. Like the Pompidou Centre, the building was highly influenced by the work of Archigram in the 1950s and 1960s.

Rogers selects primarily concrete and some steel for the structure, utilizing materials appropriate to the site's local logistics. Additionally, Rogers emphasizes that contemporary buildings incorporate both current and historical technologies.

The building consists of three main towers and three service towers around a central, rectangular space. Its core is the large Underwriting Room on the ground floor, which houses the Lutine Bell within the Rostrum. Also on the ground floor is the loss book which for 300 years has had entries of significant losses entered by quill. The Underwriting Room (often simply called "the Room") is overlooked by galleries, forming a 60 metres (197 ft) high atrium lit naturally through a huge barrel-vaulted glass roof. The first three galleries open onto the atrium space, and are connected by escalators through the middle of the structure. The higher floors are glassed in and can only be reached via the exterior lifts or staircases. The fourth floor is an exception to this, as during a refurbishment it was glassed in, but remains accessible via internal escalator

The 11th floor houses the Committee Room (also known as the Adam Room), an 18th-century dining room designed for the 2nd Earl of Shelburne by Robert Adam in 1763; it was transferred piece by piece from the previous (1958) Lloyd's building across the road at 51 Lime Street.

The Lloyd's building is 88 metres (289 ft) to the roof, with 14 floors. On top of each service core stand the cleaning cranes, increasing the overall height to 95.10 metres (312 ft). Modular in plan, each floor can be altered by addition or removal of partitions and walls.

Simplified plan and rotating 3D model (to see rotation model view the image at its direct link)

=== Criticism ===
King Charles and others initially criticized the design of Lloyd's Building, similar to the backlash of Centre Pompidou. Rogers stated that, "Lloyds said they wanted two things: they wanted a building that would last into the next century – we made that one – and they wanted a building that would meet their changing needs."

One of those changing needs relates to the much-vaunted design innovation of having the service pipes, ducts, and stairwells outside the walls; this led to such costs caused by weathering and maintenance that Lloyds considered vacating the building in 2014. Lloyd's former chief executive Richard Ward said: "There is a fundamental problem with this building. Everything is exposed to the elements, and that makes it very costly."

== Gallery ==
Images inside and outside of the Lloyd's building
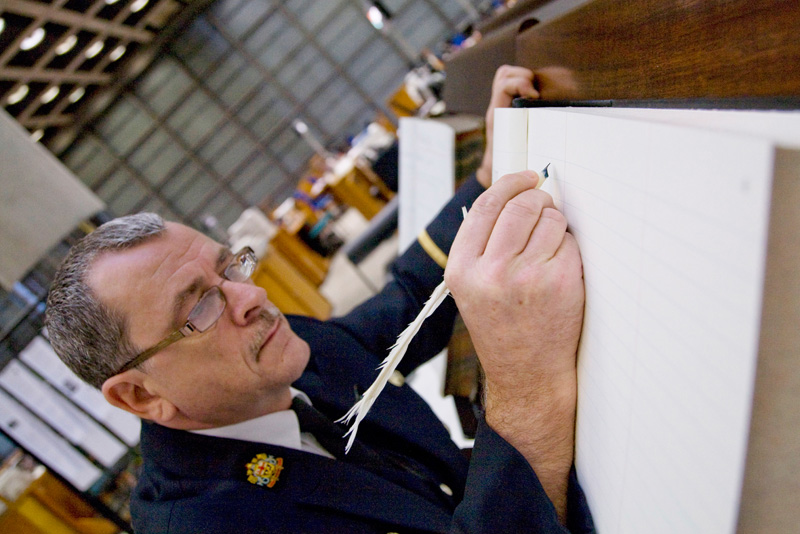
A Liveried Waiter writes in the Loss Book

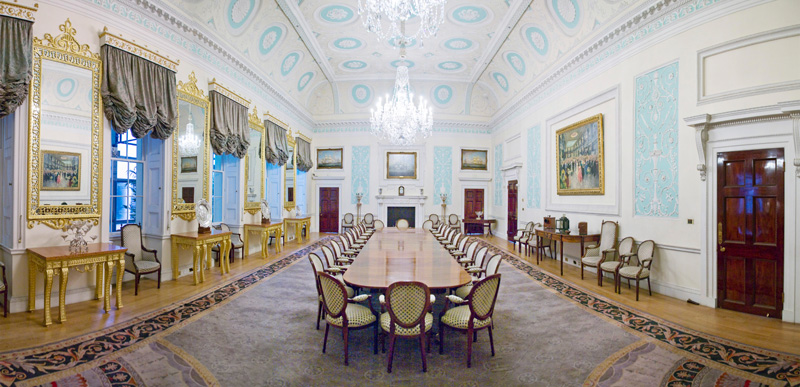
The Committee Room, on the 11th floor of the building

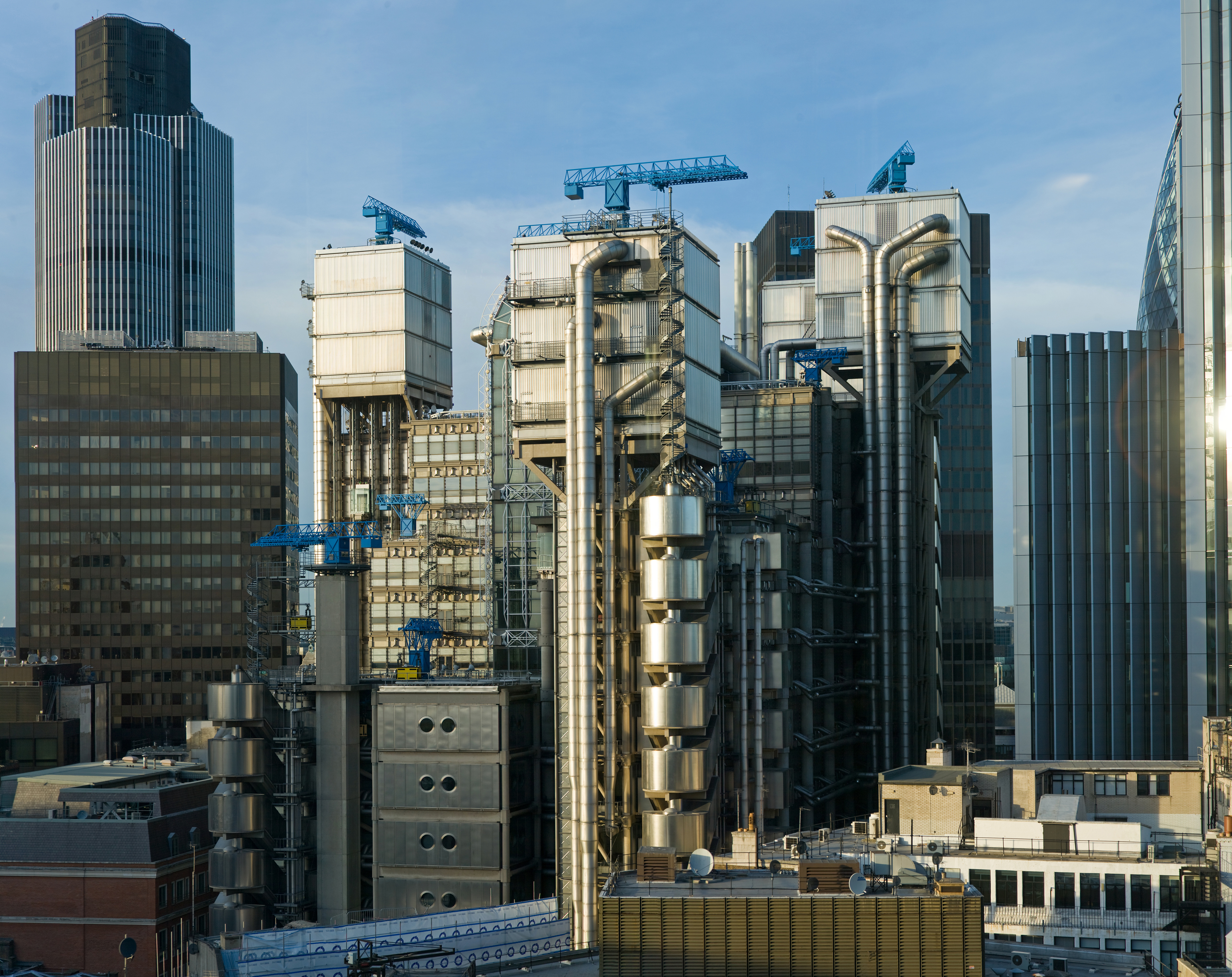
The Lloyd's building among the City skyline (2007)

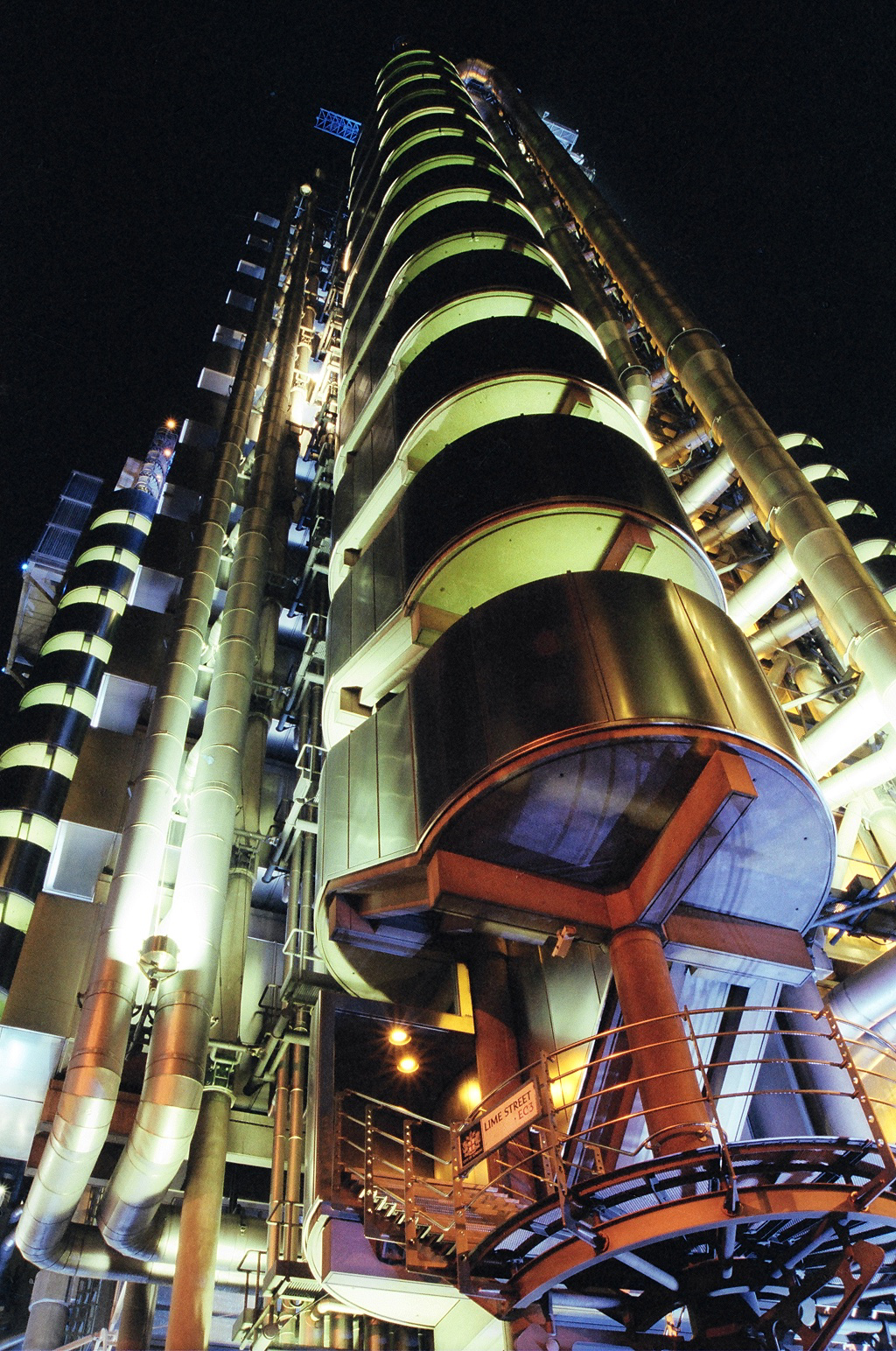
Lloyd's building at night

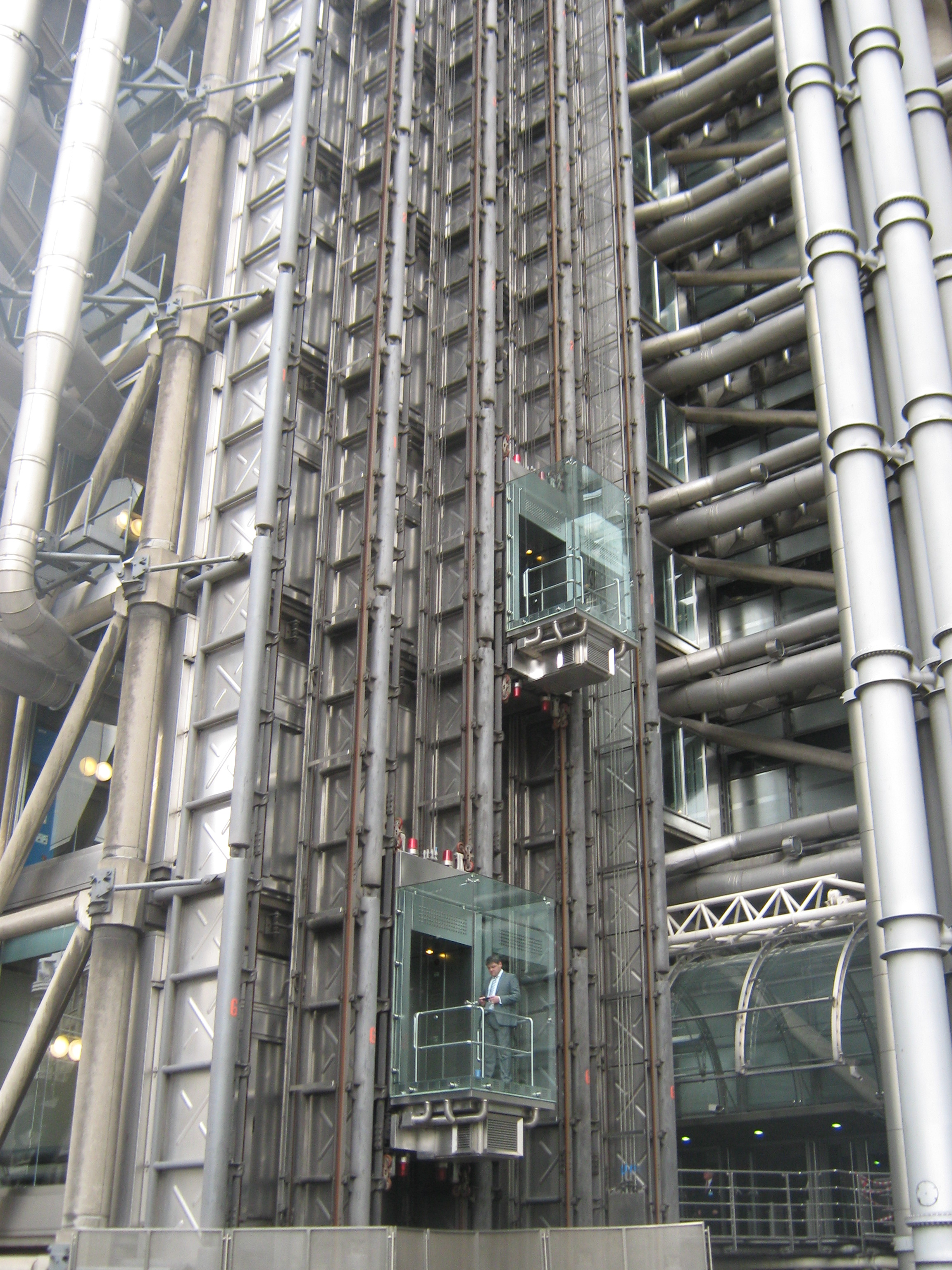
The lifts on the outside of the building

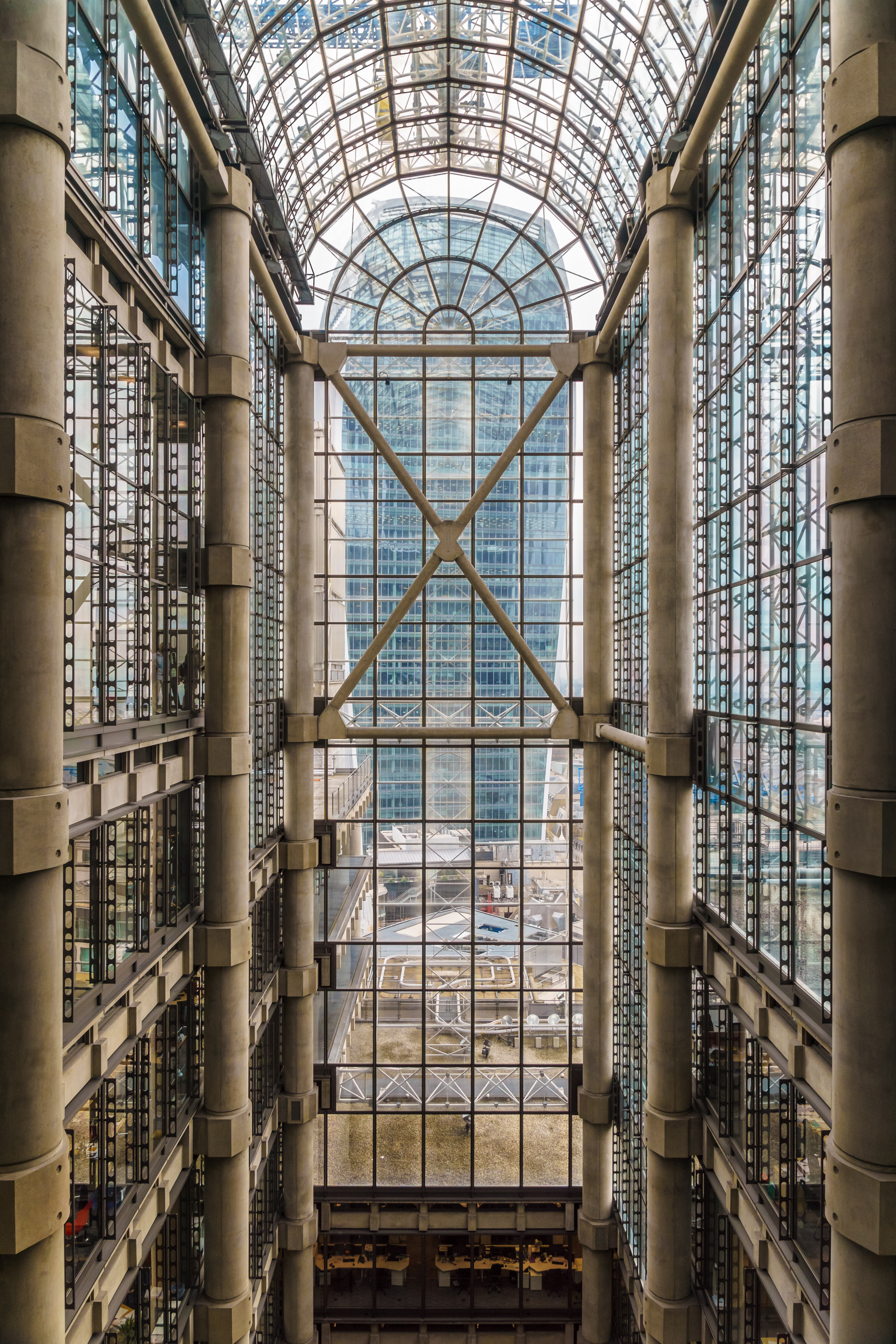
The atrium

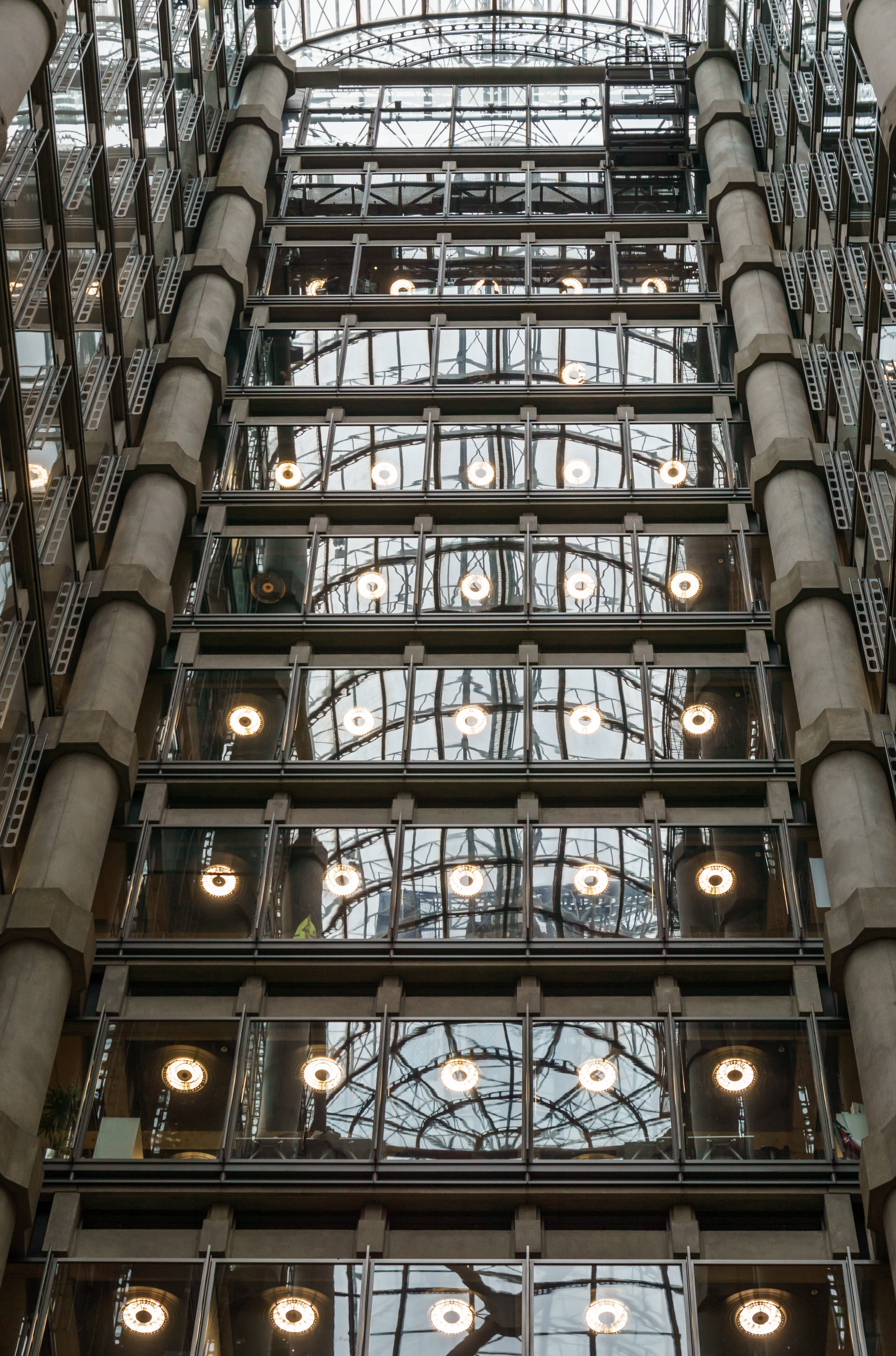
The atrium

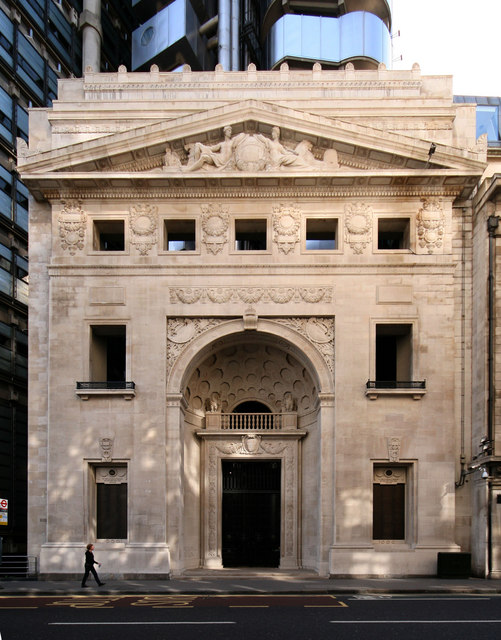
The 1925 building façade on the northwest corner

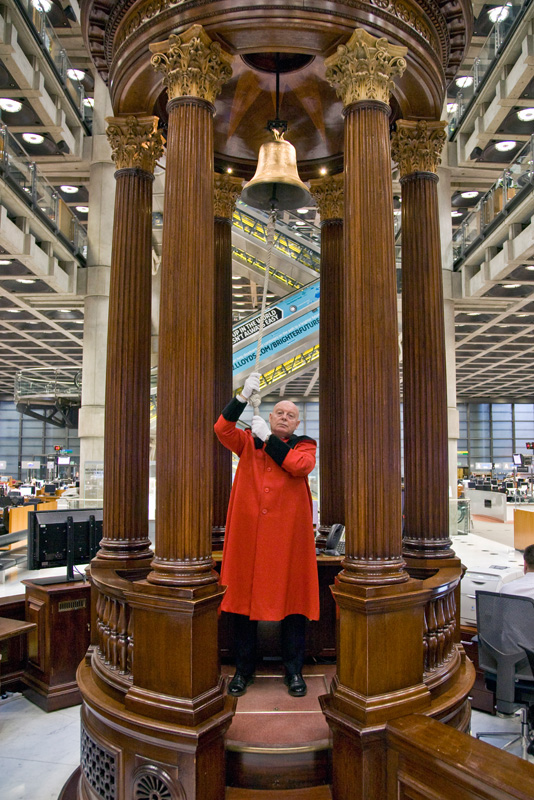
The Lutine Bell is housed in the Rostrum

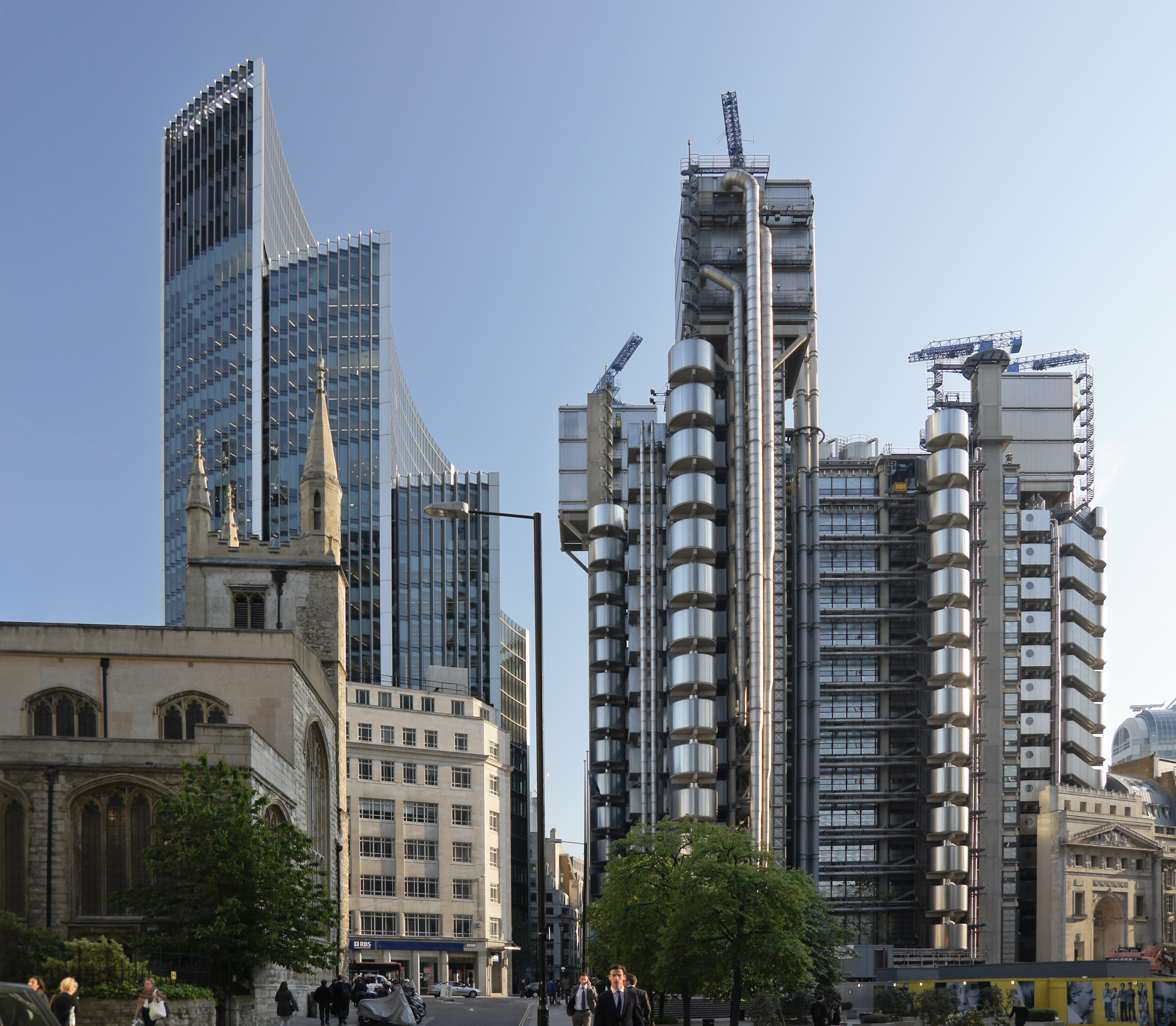
The Willis Building (left) and the Lloyd's building (right)

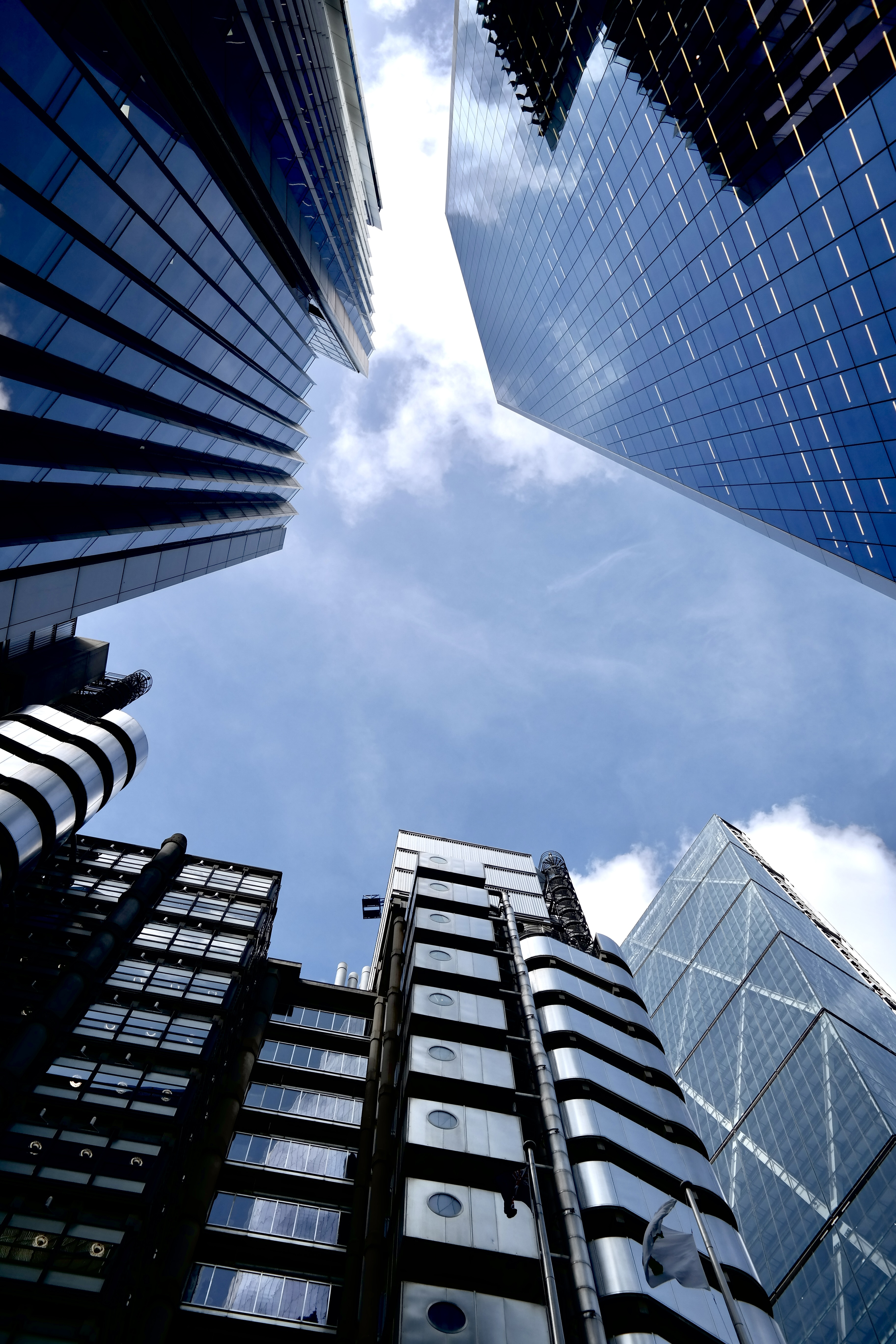
Surrounded by new skyscrapers in 2024

== See also ==
- EPM Intelligent Building – a Medellin building inspired by the Lloyd's building
- Willis Building, opposite at 51 Lime Street, on the site of a former Lloyd's building
- 30 St Mary Axe – Norman Foster's gherkin-shaped skyscraper nearby
- 122 Leadenhall Street – a skyscraper opposite on the northern side of Leadenhall Street
- 52–54 Lime Street – 'The Scalpel' skyscraper opposite
- List of tallest buildings and structures in London
- World Architecture Survey
