= GawLab Organisation =

Senegalese non-profit organization

GawLab (which means "fast" in Wolof) is a cultural non profit NGO based in Dakar. Its mission is to trickle and customize the use of IT in Africa and it focuses in African cultural policies and productions, digital art, art history and cultural heritage.

== History ==
GAW is based on the experience of the informal group WAG Women Action Group and the name GAW comes from the inverted acronym WAG-GAW. The history of the organisation is deeply linked with the history of the Phone Centres and the Internet in Senegal and specifically in Dakar. GAW is created as a platform to encourage on-line collaborative work and to provide artists and intellectuals based in Dakar with digital tools.

GawLab was founded by Sylviane Dio, N'Goné Fall.
