= Anthony Gaw =

Hong Kong businessman

Anthony T. Gaw
- Born: Anthony Teong-chan Gaw; November 8, 1941; Burma (now Myanmar)
- Died: February 8, 1999 (aged 57); Washington, D.C., US
- Education: Purdue University; Stanford University
- Occupations: Businessman, property investor
- Title: Chairman, Pioneer Global Group
- Spouse: Rosanna Wang Gaw
- Children: Goodwin Gaw; Kenneth Gaw; Christina Gaw

Anthony T. Gaw (8 November 1941 – 8 February 1999) was a Hong Kong property investor, the chairman and managing director of Pioneer Global Group, a Hong Kong Stock Exchange-listed conglomerate, principally involved in investment in properties and hotels, and related financing.

== Early life ==
Gaw was born in Burma on 8 November 1941, and moved to Hong Kong in 1955 aged 13, with his family.

== Education ==
Gaw received a bachelor's degree in chemical engineering from Purdue University. He studied at Stanford University in California for one year, but finished his master's degree in electrical engineering at Purdue in 1964. He started a PhD at the University of California, Berkeley, but stopped after he met his future wife.

== Career ==
Gaw worked for Honeywell in the US for one year, before moving to Thailand to start a textile mill for the family business, after which he moved to Indonesia to start another factory, then he settled in Hong Kong.

== Personal life ==
Gaw was married to Rosanna Wang Gaw, and they had three children, Goodwin Gaw, Kenneth Gaw, and Christina Gaw. Goodwin Gaw was born in California.

He died on 8 February 1999 in Washington, D.C., after a short illness.
