= Goodwin Gaw =

Hong Kong businessman

- Born: November 25, 1968 (age 57); San Francisco County, California, U.S.
- Education: University of Pennsylvania (BS, MBA); Stanford University (MS)
- Occupation: Property businessman
- Title: Chairman, Gaw Capital Partners
- Children: 2
- Parent(s): Anthony Gaw; Rosanna Wang
- Relatives: Kenneth Gaw (brother)

Goodwin S. Gaw (born November 25, 1968) is a Hong Kong property businessman, the chairman of Gaw Capital Partners, which manages US$8 billion of property investments, including the Gaw family's money, estimated at US$1.5 billion.

== Early life ==
Gaw was born in San Francisco County, California while his father was a master's degree student in engineering at Stanford University. Gaw's father was Anthony Gaw (1941-1999), a property businessman. Gaw's mother is Rosanna Wang. Gaw's younger brother Kenneth Gaw was born in Thailand. Gaw's sister is Christina Gaw.

== Education ==
Gaw has a bachelor's degree in civil engineering from the University of Pennsylvania after transferring from Rochester Institute of Technology, a master's degree in construction management from Stanford University, and an MBA from the Wharton School, University of Pennsylvania.

== Career ==
Gaw is the founder and managing principal of Downtown Properties. In 1995, Downtown Properties, bought the 335-room Hollywood Roosevelt Hotel in Los Angeles, California, out of bankruptcy.

In 2006, Gaw bought a rundown 71-year-old Art Deco seven-storey shopping mall on Nanjing Road, Shanghai for US$105 million, and intended to spend $25 million on restoration.

In 2015, the Gaw family had an estimated net worth of US$1.5 billion.

== Personal life ==
Gaw is married, with two children, and lives in Hong Kong. Gaw renounced his United States citizenship in 2007.
