= List of works by Norman Foster =

This list of works by Norman Foster categorizes the work of the Pritzker Prize-winning architect. Foster has established an extremely prolific career in the span of four decades. The following are some of his major constructions:

== Completed projects ==
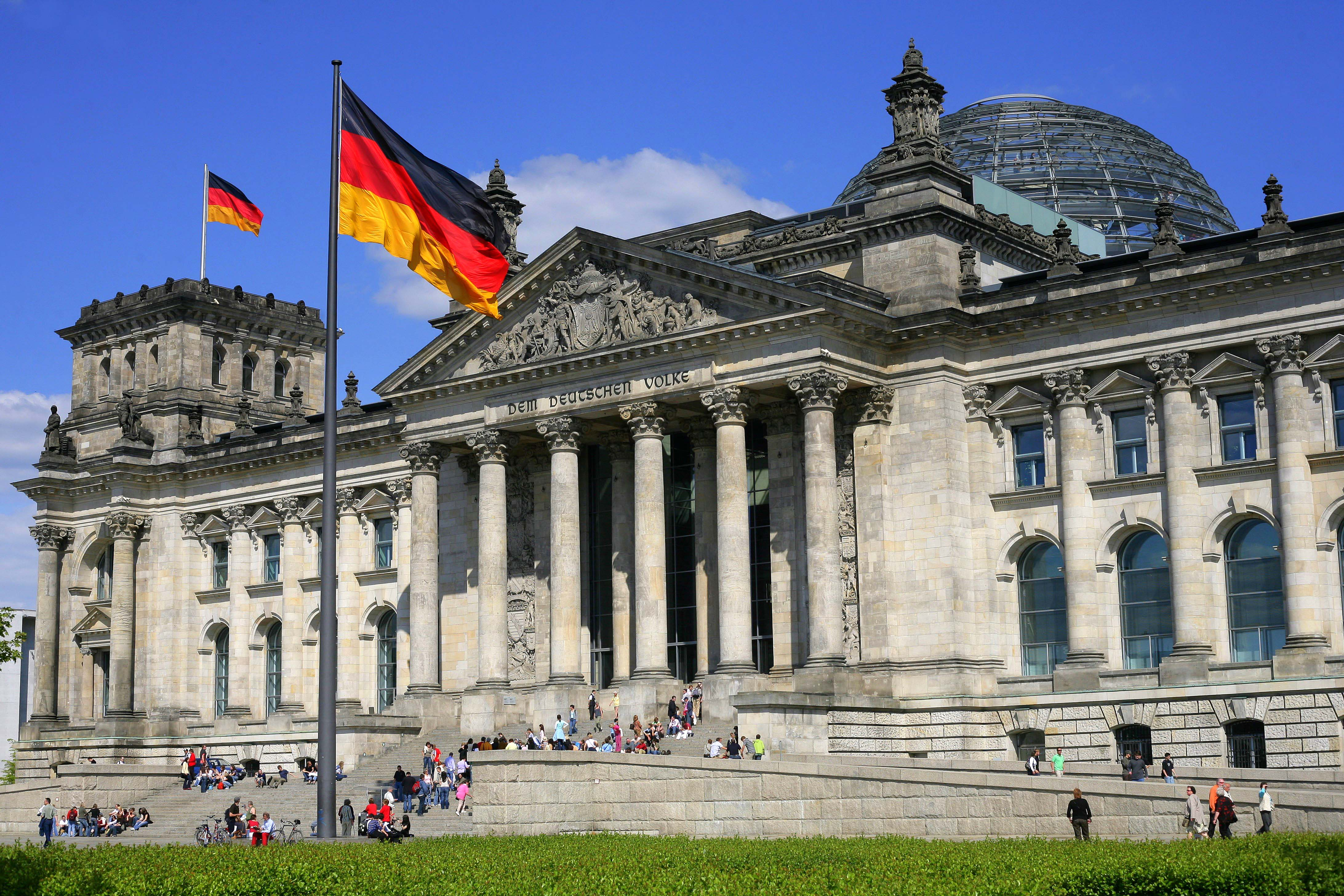
The restored Reichstag in Berlin, housing the German parliament. The dome is part of Foster's redesign

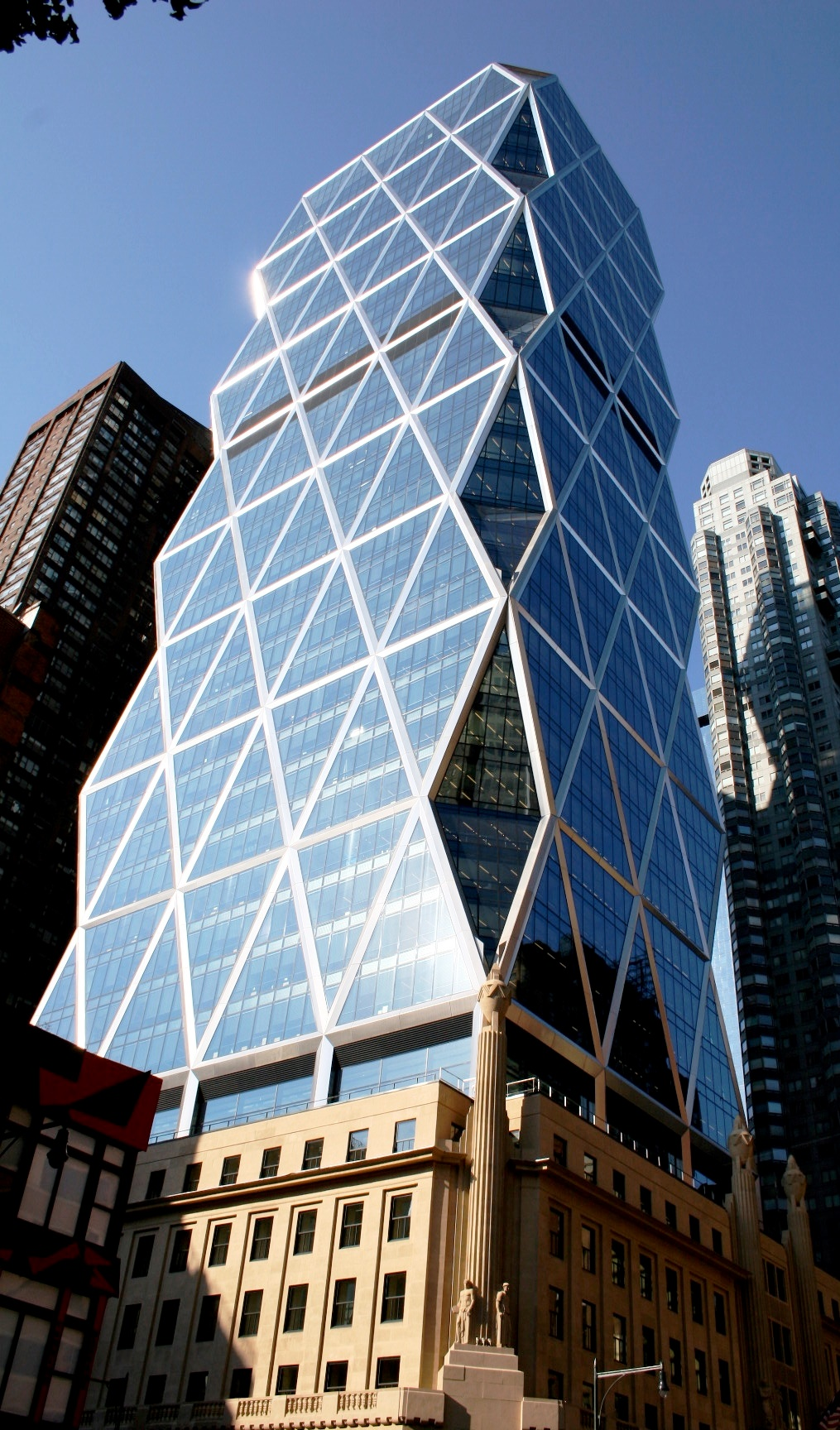
The Hearst Tower in New York City

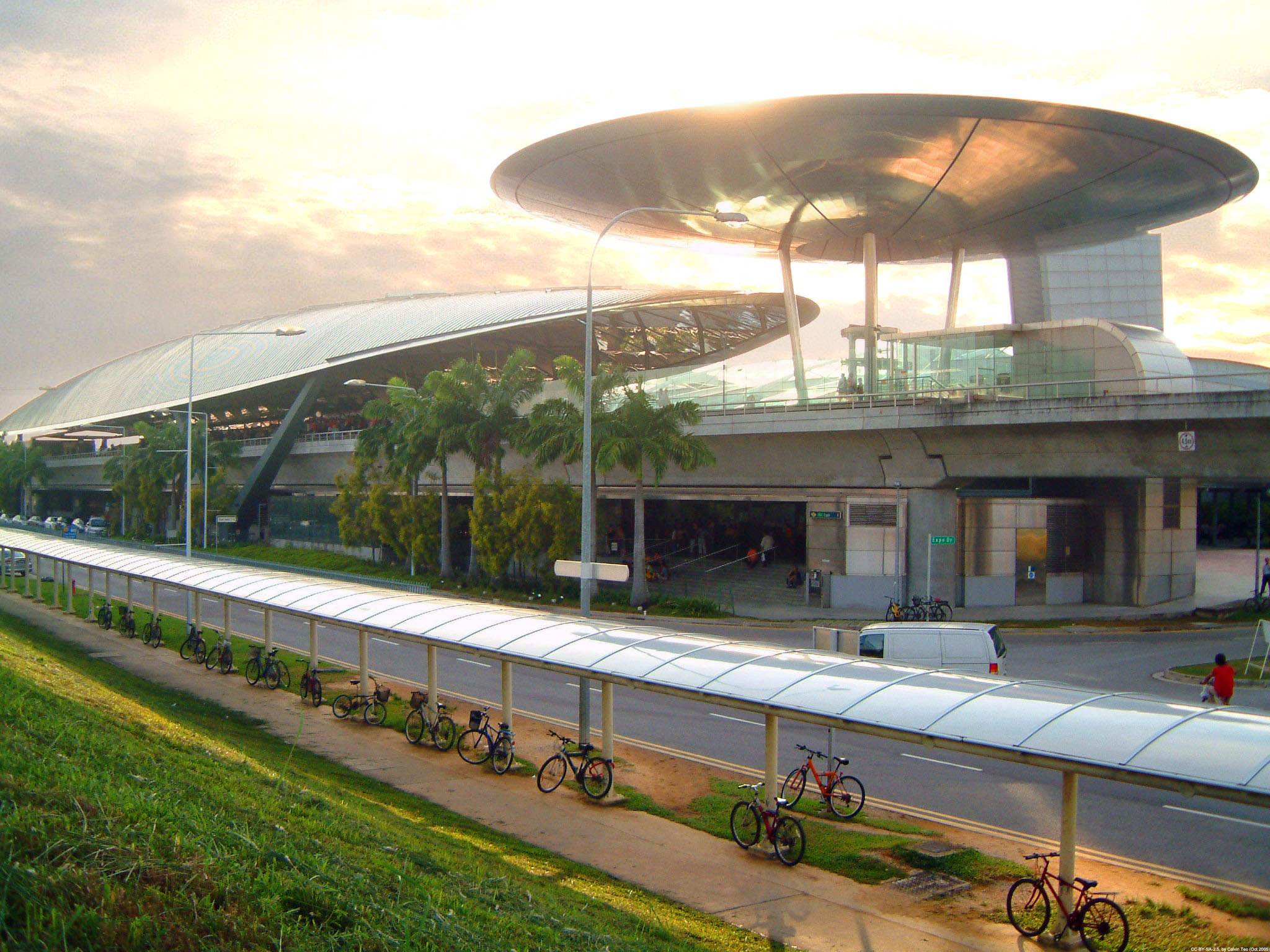
The Expo MRT station, part of the Mass Rapid Transit system in Singapore

Millau Viaduct, near Millau in Southern France

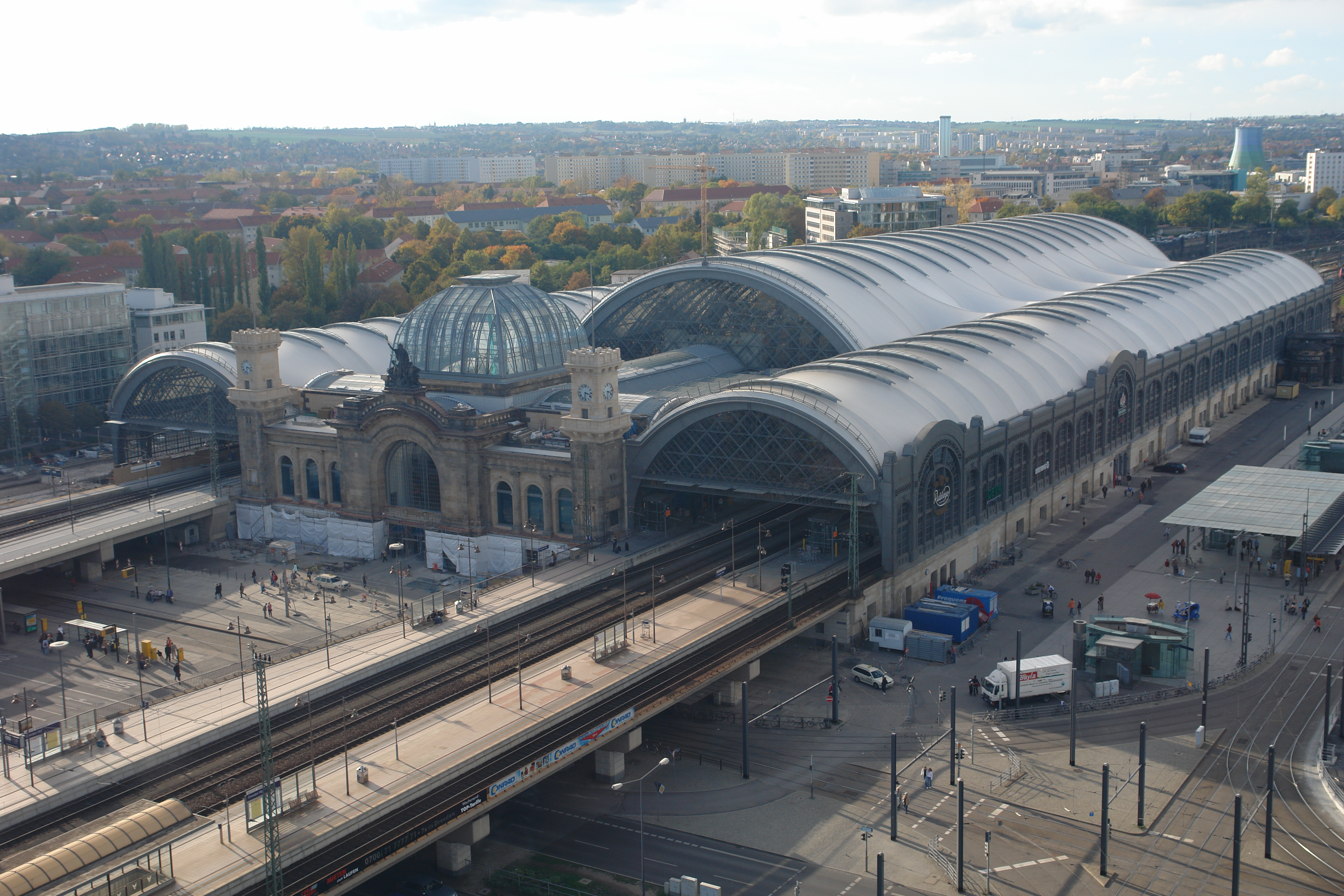
Dresden Hauptbahnhof roof and cupola

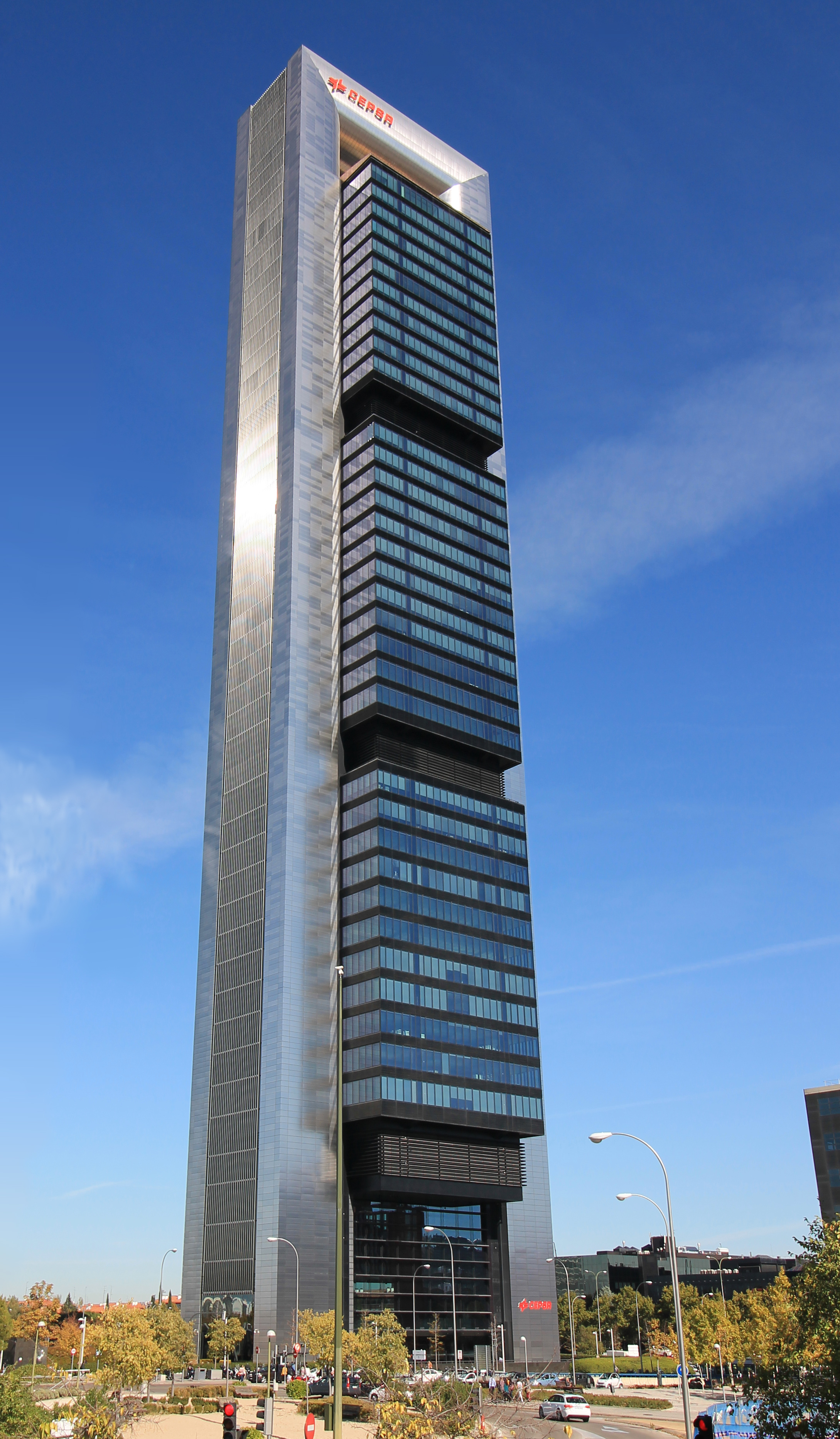
Torre Cepsa in Madrid, Spain

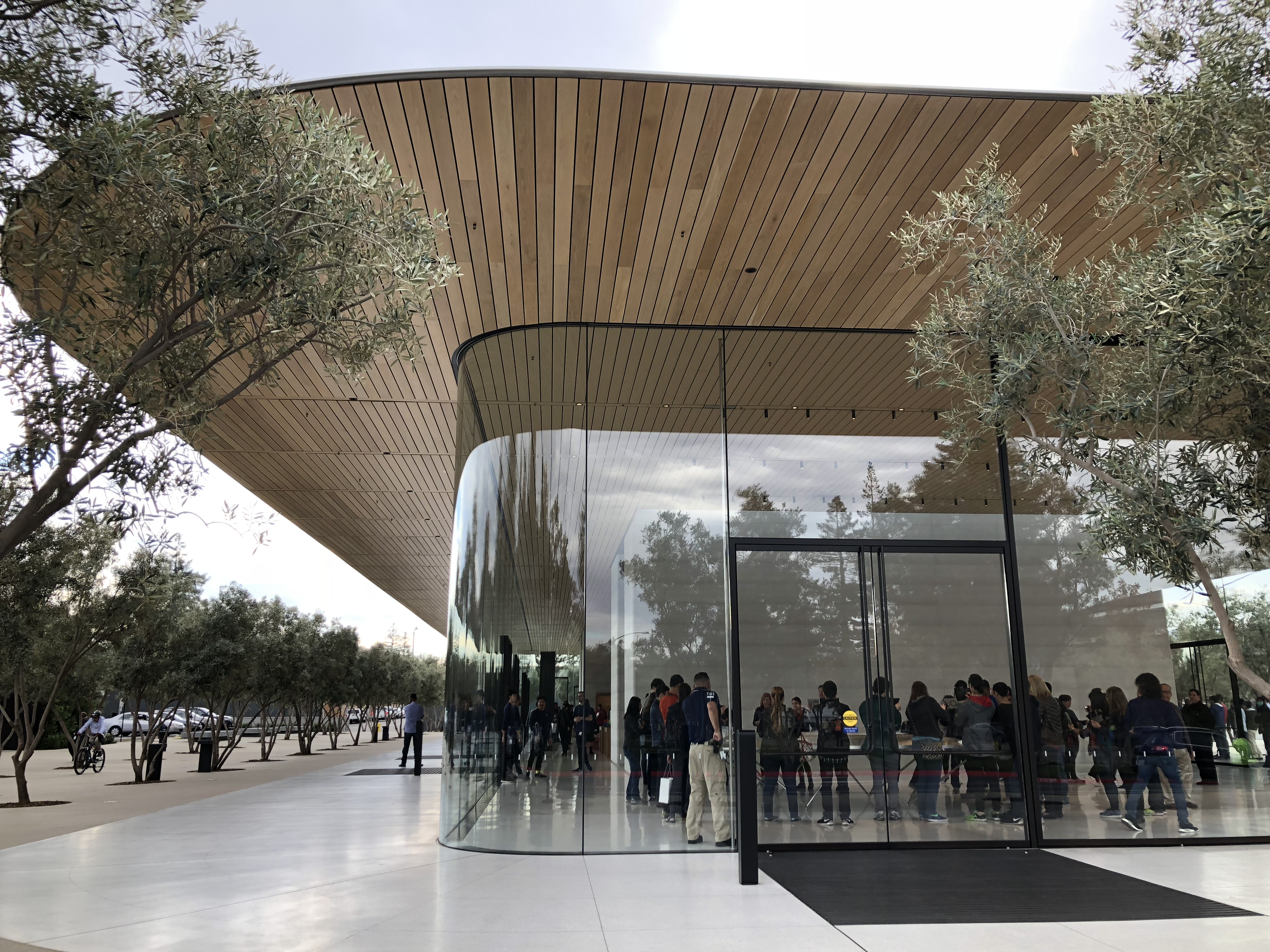
Apple Park, California

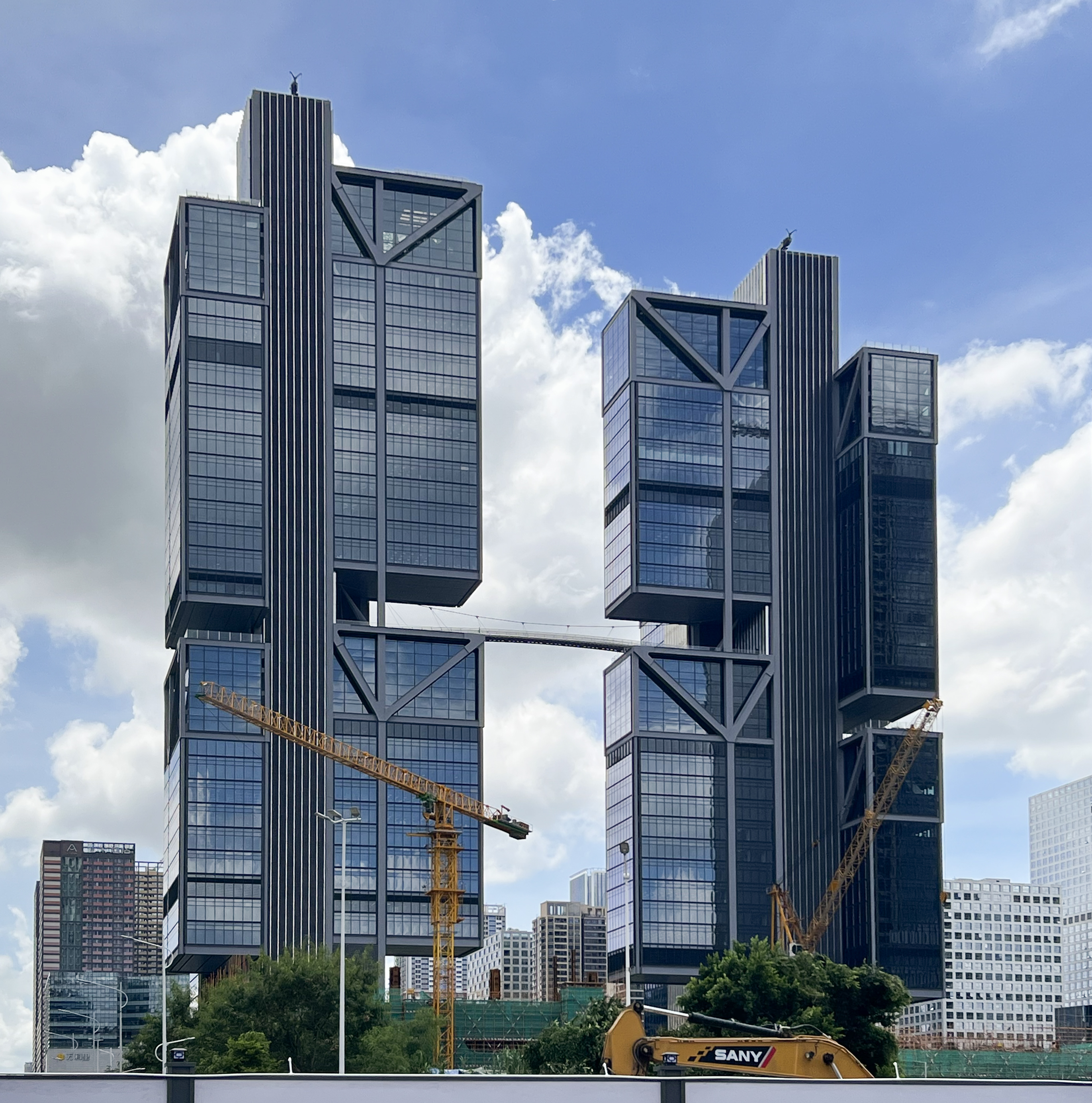
DJI Sky City, Shenzhen, China

Started	Completed	Project	Location	Country	Notes
	1967	Reliance Controls factory	Swindon	United Kingdom	joint project with Richard Rogers in Team 4
1969	1971	Fred. Olsen Lines terminal	London Docklands	United Kingdom	
1970	1971	IBM Pilot Head Office	Cosham, Portsmouth	United Kingdom	
1971	1975	Willis Faber and Dumas Headquarters	Ipswich	United Kingdom	
1973	1977	Beanhill Housing Estate	Milton Keynes	United Kingdom	
1974	1978	Sainsbury Centre for Visual Arts at the University of East Anglia	Norwich	United Kingdom	
1980	1982	Renault Centre	Swindon	United Kingdom	
1979	1985	HSBC Main Building	Hong Kong	Hong Kong	
1981	1991	Terminal building at London Stansted Airport	London	United Kingdom	
	1990	Headquarters of ITN, 200 Grays Inn Road	London	United Kingdom	
	1992	Torre de Collserola	Barcelona	Spain	
1984	1993	Carré d'Art	Nîmes	France	
	1993	Kings Norton Library, Cranfield University	Cranfield	United Kingdom	
	1993	Lycée Albert Camus	Fréjus	France	
	1994	Joslyn Art Museum Scott Pavillion	Omaha, NE	United States	
1988	1995	Bilbao Metro	Bilbao	Spain	
	1995	Faculty of Law, Cambridge	Cambridge	United Kingdom	
	1996	National Sea Life Centre	Birmingham	United Kingdom	
1995	1997	The Clyde Auditorium, part of the Scottish Exhibition and Conference Centre	Glasgow, Scotland	United Kingdom	
1995	1997	The American Air Museum, part of the Imperial War Museum	Duxford	United Kingdom	
1991	1997	Commerzbank Tower	Frankfurt	Germany	
1992	1998	Hong Kong International Airport	Chek Lap Kok	Hong Kong	
1993	1998	Valencia Congress Centre	Valencia	Spain	
	1998	World Port Center	Rotterdam	The Netherlands	
	1998	Portsmouth Damm	Duisburg	Germany	
1995	1999	Rotherbaum Multimedia Centre	Hamburg	Germany	
	1999	Canary Wharf tube station, London Underground	London	United Kingdom	
	1999	Redevelopment of the Great Court of the British Museum	London	United Kingdom	
	1999	Social Sciences Division, Manor Road Building, University of Oxford	Oxford	United Kingdom	
	1999	Reichstag restoration	Berlin	Germany	
	2000	Greater London Authority Building (London City Hall)	London	United Kingdom	
	2000	The Great Glasshouse of the National Botanic Garden of Wales	Llanarthney	United Kingdom	
1996	2000	London Millennium Bridge	London	United Kingdom	
	2000	Center for Clinical Science Research, Stanford University	Palo Alto, CA	United States	
	2001	Expo MRT station	Singapore	Singapore	
1994	2001	Al Faisaliyah Center	Riyadh	Saudi Arabia	with architectural artist Brian Clarke
	2001	La Poterie metro station	Rennes	France	
	2001	J Sainsbury headquarters, Holborn Circus	London	United Kingdom	
1999	2001	Lionel Robbins Building renovation, British Library of Political and Economic Science, London School of Economics	London	United Kingdom	
	2002	8 Canada Square (HSBC Group Head Office)	London	United Kingdom	
1997	2003	Metropolitan Building	Warsaw	Poland	
	2003	James H. Clark Center, Stanford University	Palo Alto, CA	United States	
	2003	Universiti Teknologi Petronas main campus	Perak	Malaysia	
	2003	Capital City Academy	London	United Kingdom	
1997	2004	30 St Mary Axe, Swiss Re London headquarters	London	United Kingdom	
	2004	The Sage Gateshead	Gateshead	United Kingdom	
	2004	Moor House	London	United Kingdom	
	2004	McLaren Technology Centre	Woking	United Kingdom	
	2004	Imperial Business School, Imperial College London	London	United Kingdom	
	2004	The Millau Viaduct	near Millau	France	
	2005	Supreme Court Building		Singapore	
	2005	Western Årsta Bridge	Stockholm	Sweden	
	2005	(40 luxury apartments)	St. Moritz	Switzerland	
	2005	National Police Memorial, The Mall	London	United Kingdom	
	2005	Philological Library, Free University of Berlin	Berlin	Germany	
	2005	Deutsche Bank Place	Sydney	Australia	first Sir Norman Foster building in the Southern Hemisphere
2002	2006	Dresden Hauptbahnhof reconstruction	Dresden	Germany	
	2006	Hearst Tower	New York City, NY	United States	
	2006	Leslie L. Dan Pharmacy Building at the University of Toronto	Toronto, Ontario	Canada	
	2006	Palace of Peace and Reconciliation	Astana	Kazakhstan	with architectural artist Brian Clarke
	2007	Fraser Suites Sydney	Sydney	Australia	
2002	2007	Wembley Stadium	London	United Kingdom	
2004	2007	The Willis Building	London	United Kingdom	
2005	2007	Thomas Deacon Academy	Peterborough	United Kingdom	
2004	2007	Kogod Courtyard, Center for American Art and Portraiture at the National Portrait Gallery	Washington, D.C.	United States	
	2007	International Terminal, Beijing Capital International Airport	Beijing	China	
2006	2008	Lumiere residences, Regent Place	Sydney	Australia	
2006	2008	John Spoor Broome Library, California State University Channel Islands	Camarillo, CA	United States	
2007	2008	New Elephant House, Copenhagen Zoo	Copenhagen	Denmark	
2004	2008	Torre Cepsa	Madrid	Spain	
2007	2010	Bodegas Portia's building	Gumiel de Izán	Spain	
2009	2010	Sperone Westwater	New York City, NY	United States	
	2010	Art of the Americas Wing at the Museum of Fine Arts, Boston	Boston, MA	United States	
	2010	Buenos Aires City Government Headquarters	Buenos Aires	Argentina	
2006	2010	Khan Shatyr Entertainment Center	Astana	Kazakhstan	
2004	2011	Jameson House	Vancouver, British Columbia	Canada	
2004	2011	The Troika	Kuala Lumpur	Malaysia	2004–2009
2007	2011	The Bow	Calgary, Alberta	Canada	
2002	2013	Lenbachhaus	Munich	Germany	
2005	2013	The SSE Hydro	Glasgow, Scotland	United Kingdom	
	2012	Campus Luigi Einaudi, part of the University of Turin	Turin	Italy	
	2013	Faena Aleph Residences	Buenos Aires	Argentina	
	2013	Ombrelle	Old Port, Marseille	France	
	2014	Edward P. Evans Hall, Yale School of Management, Yale University	New Haven, CT	United States	
	2014	Apple Store, Zorlu Center	Istanbul	Turkey	
	2014	Yacht Club de Monaco	Monte Carlo	Monaco	
	2014	CityCenterDC	Washington, D.C.	United States	
	2015	Apple Store, West Lake	Hangzhou	China	
	2015	Ilham Tower	Kuala Lumpur	Malaysia	
	2016	South Beach		Singapore	
	2017	Apple Park	Cupertino, CA	United States	
	2018	Comcast Technology Center	Philadelphia, PA	United States	
	2018	DUO (apartment building)	Central Park, Sydney	Australia	
	2019	BBC Cymru Wales New Broadcasting House	Cardiff, Wales	United Kingdom	
	2019	Samson Pavilion, Cleveland Clinic	Cleveland, OH	United States	
	2020	Russian Copper Company Headquarters	Yekaterinburg	Russia	
	2020	Apple Store	Marina Bay Sands	Singapore	
	2020	Apple Store, CentralWorld	Bangkok	Thailand	
	2021	The Pavilion, University of Pennsylvania	Philadelphia, PA	United States	
	2022	Salesforce Tower	Sydney	Australia	
	2022	Varso	Warsaw	Poland	
	2022	DJI Sky City	Shenzhen	China	

== Proposed or under construction ==
- Magdi Yacoub Heart Foundation, Cairo, Egypt
- Zayed National Museum, Abu Dhabi, United Arab Emirates
- APIIC Tower, Hyderabad, India (2007–2020)
- Amaravati city masterplan, Andhra Pradesh, India (2017-2025).
- Culture and Leisure Centre, Ciudad del Motor de AragónCarbon neutral design wins Motor City competition in Aragon Spain | Foster + Partners, Alcañiz, Spain (2007) (competition won)
- Techo Takhmao International Airport, Phnom Penh, Cambodia (2019–2025)
- 200 Greenwich Street, Tower 2 of the planned reconstruction of the World Trade Center in New York City, United States (under construction).
- Reconstruction of New Holland Island, Saint Petersburg, Russia (ongoing)
- U2 Tower, Dublin, Ireland (2008–2011) (competition won) (construction postponed)
- Crystal Island, Moscow, Russia
- Hermitage Plaza, Paris (La Défense), France
- Edmond and Lily Safra Center for Brain Sciences, Hebrew University of Jerusalem, Israel.
- Royal Hamilius Centre, Luxembourg
- Milano Santa Giulia residential district, Milan, Italy
- Restoration of the 'Hall of Realms' (Salón de Reinos) as an expansion of the Prado Museum in Madrid, Spain (completion later than 2024).
- Omkar 1973, apartment building, Worli, Mumbai (completion 2018).
- Bilbao Fine Arts Museum expansion, Bilbao, Spain (competition won, 2019)
- Torre Córdoba y Alem, Buenos Aires, Argentina (under construction)
- One Beverly Hills, Three tower complex adjacent the Beverly Hilton in Los Angeles, California. Towers approved and expected by 2026. urbanize.com
- La Fabrica Complex, Santiago, Chile. (Announced in 2021)
- Firenze Belfiore high-speed railway station, Florence, Italy (under construction, projected completion 2028)

== Non-architectural projects ==
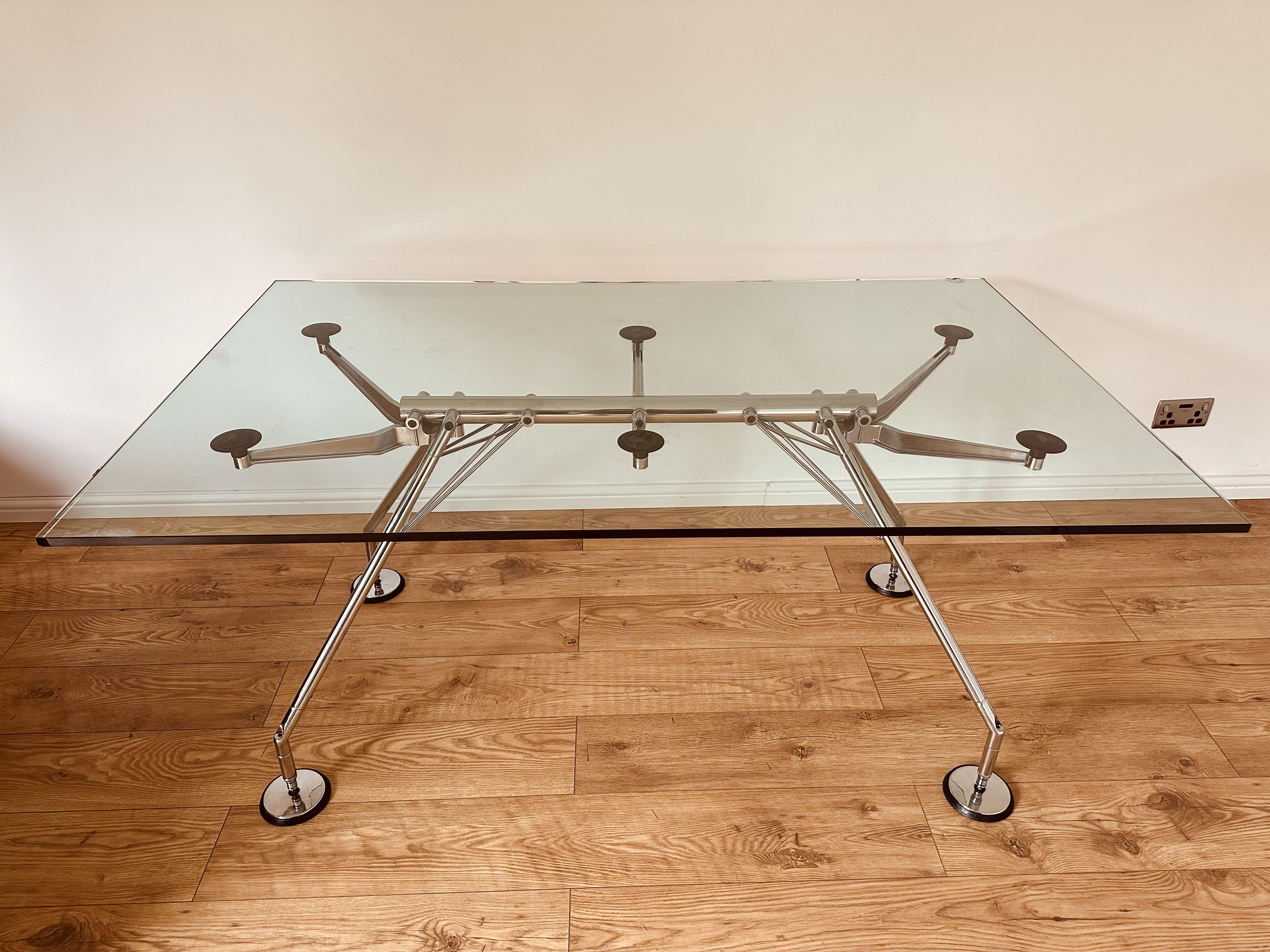
The Tecno Nomos Desk, manufactured by Tecno S.p.A., designed by Sir Norman Foster.

Foster's other design work has included the Nomos table and desk for Italian manufacturer Tecno, chairs and other furniture for American manufacturer Emeco, the wind turbine housings for Enercon, and the motor yacht Izanami (later Ronin) for Lürssen Yachts.

In October 2010, CNN announced that Foster recreated Buckminster Fuller's Dymaxion car.
