= Creek Vean =

Grade II* listed house in Cornwall, England

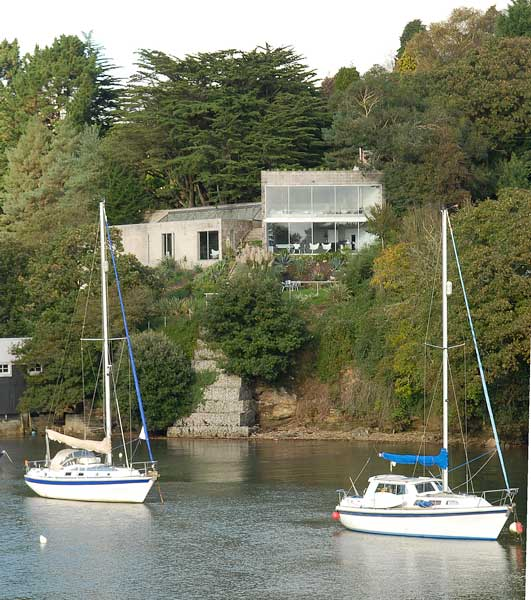
- Creek Vean house in 2006
- Interactive map of the Creek Vean area
- Alternative names: Creekvean or The Marcus and Irene Brumwell House

General information
- Architectural style: Modernist architecture
- Location: Creek Vean, Pill Lane, Feock., Truro, England
- Coordinates: 50°12′28.7964″N 5°2′49.2396″W
- Construction started: 1963
- Completed: 1966
- Client: Marcus & Rene Brumwell
- Owner: William (Dick) and Gill Dickinson in 2021

Technical details
- Floor area: 350 m^{2} (3,800 sq ft)

Design and construction
- Architects: Project Architects: Laurie Abbott, Norman Foster, Wendy Foster née Cheesman, Richard Rogers, Su Rogers née Brumwell
- Architecture firm: Team 4
- Developer: Marcus and Rene Brumwell
- Structural engineer: Anthony Hunt Associates
- Quantity surveyor: GA Hanscomb Partnership
- Main contractor: Leonard Williams Ltd
- Awards: RIBA Award; Architectural Design Project Award

Listed Building – Grade II*
- Official name: Creekvean and Attached Entrance Bridge and Walls to Road
- Designated: 15 July 1998; 28 years ago
- Reference no.: 1375676

Creek Vean is the Grade II* listed residential property in the village of Feock in Cornwall, England. It was the first building designed by Team 4, being commissioned by Su Brumwell's parents, Marcus Brumwell and Irene Brumwell. Construction began in 1963 and it was completed in 1966.

== History ==
Su Brumwell's parents, Marcus and Irene Brumwell wanted a retirement home on land he owned in Feock, Cornwall. Marcus Brumwell was the business partner of H. Stuart Menzies who established the Stuart Advertising Agency, and when Menzies retired around 1938–9, Brumwell became the managing director. He later co-founded the Design Research Unit, along with Herbert Read.

The building attempts to fit more snugly into its waterfront surroundings by generating a garden on the roof. As this starts to become overgrown, the house will recede into its creek-side Cornish setting.

— Norman Foster, founder and executive chair of Foster + Partners

Ernst Freud originally drew up plans for the new house. Marcus Brumwell sent the designs onto Richard Rogers while he was still at the Yale School of Architecture. Rogers thought the design "appalling". Rogers felt that the Brumwells should have a home deserving of displaying the artwork of artists such as Henry Moore, Barbara Hepworth and Ben Nicholson. Consequently, the Brumwells decided to commission Team 4 instead to design their new home instead. Team 4 had been established in 1963 by Yale School of Architecture graduates Su Brumwell, Wendy Cheesman, Norman Foster, and Richard Rogers. Cheesman's sister Georgie Wolton also co-founded the firm, and she was the only fully qualified architect within the group, which allowed partnership to function as an architectural firm. However, several months later she had left Team 4. It was the first building to be designed by Team 4.In addition to the four partners of Team 4, Creek Vean is also the work of Laurie Abbott who joined Team 4 as an assistant architect while working on Creek Vean. Frank Peacock was another architect who also involved in the project, along with Anthony Hunt. Richard Rogers was influenced by Frank Lloyd Wright in the design of the house after his return from the Yale School of Architecture.

Creek Vean took three years to construct and was completed in 1966, however, construction costs of Creek Vean house almost bankrupted the Brumwells, as it went over budget and over-ran the original timescale. The Brumwell's had to sell a Piet Mondrian painting bought from the artist in the 1930s, to be able to fund the new house. The house ended up with water leaks from the roof, and other structural problems along with heating problems.

== Listing and award ==
In 1969, Creek Vean became the first house to ever receive a Royal Institute of British Architects award. The RIBA award was for Work of Outstanding Quality.

In 1998, Creek Vean was Grade-II listed, it was subsequently upgraded to Grade II*. It is listed as "Creekvean and Attached Entrance Bridge and Walls to Road".
