= Brumwell =

Brumwell is a surname. Notable people with the surname include:

- David Brumwell (born 1953), Canadian swimmer
- George Brumwell (1939–2005), British trade unionist
- George Timothy Brumwell, birth name of Lord Tim Hudson (1940–2019), English DJ
- Marcus Brumwell (1901–1983), British advertising executive and designer
- Murray Brumwell (born 1960), Canadian ice hockey player
- Phil Brumwell (born 1975), English footballer
- Su Brumwell, British architect and founding member of Team 4

== See also ==
- Brumwell Thomas (1868–1948), English architect
