= Halo Service Solutions =

British software company

- Type: Private
- Industry: Software
- Founders: Paul Hamilton; Alan Rogerson
- Headquarters: Stowmarket, Suffolk, England
- Number of employees: c. 250 (2026)
- Website: usehalo.com

Halo Service Solutions, also known as Halo, is a British software company based in Stowmarket, Suffolk, England. It develops software for IT service management (ITSM) and professional services automation (PSA). The business was co-founded by Paul Hamilton and Alan Rogerson. It was previously known as Net Help Desk and adopted the Halo name in 2020.

The BBC reported in July 2025 that the company was worth £1 billion. In October that year, The Sunday Times reported Hamilton's statement that Halo had recorded turnover of nearly £112 million over the preceding 12 months. Halo became the principal front-of-shirt sponsor of Ipswich Town F.C. in 2025 after previously appearing on the club's shirt sleeves.

== History ==
Hamilton worked with Rogerson at a freelance IT company in Inverness from 2004 to 2008 before setting up Net Help Desk. After moving to Suffolk, he ran the business from his mother-in-law's spare bedroom between 2009 and 2011. It later moved into a small office in Stowmarket.

Net Help Desk hired its first employee in 2011 and moved to larger Stowmarket premises in 2017. The business was renamed Halo in 2020 and moved again within Stowmarket the following year.

The BBC put Halo's workforce at about 150 in July 2025. By early 2026, The Sunday Times and CRN were reporting approximately 250 employees across five offices worldwide.

The Sunday Times Rich List estimated Hamilton's wealth at £1.081 billion in May 2026. The Ipswich Star placed him fifth among the East Anglian entries.

== Products ==
The Sunday Times has described Halo's software as a service management platform used by organisations to run their IT operations. CRN has described Halo as a professional services automation vendor and reported that its platform competes with ServiceNow, Kaseya and ConnectWise. CRN also reported that Halo had been selected for Gartner's Magic Quadrant for AI Applications in IT Service Management.

Customers named by the BBC include Red Bull, Sports Direct and AO. The Sunday Times has also identified Microsoft, the Ministry of Justice and the University of Cambridge as customers.

== Headquarters ==
In January 2026 it announced that the Willis Building in Ipswich would become its global headquarters during 2026. The Grade I listed building, designed by Norman Foster, opened in 1975.

Willis, now part of WTW, had occupied the building since it opened. A WTW spokesperson said the transaction was a sale-and-leaseback, with WTW remaining in the building as a tenant. Halo also said it would keep an office in Stowmarket.

Jack Abbott, the Labour MP for Ipswich, called the announcement "massive" for the town.

== Sponsorships ==
Halo first appeared on Ipswich Town's shirt sleeves in 2023. In June 2025, the club announced a three-year agreement under which Halo would replace Ed Sheeran as principal front-of-shirt sponsor of its men's and women's first teams. Club chairman Mark Ashton described it as a record shirt sponsorship deal; the financial terms were not disclosed.

A three-year agreement with the Scottish Football Association, Scottish Professional Football League and Scottish Women's Premier League followed in November 2025. Halo also entered a partnership with Scottish Rugby in February 2026.

In March 2026, Halo agreed a deal with the Professional Darts Corporation covering the 2026–27 PDC World Darts Championship.

== Halo Festival ==
Halo Festival, a one-day music event organised by the company, was launched in 2026 at Trinity Park near Ipswich. The first festival was held on 4 July 2026, with a line-up that included Two Door Cinema Club, The Vaccines, Natasha Bedingfield and Scouting for Girls.
