= Three Forms =

Sculpture by Barbara Hepworth

Three Forms (BH 72) is an abstract sculpture by Barbara Hepworth, completed in 1935.

The sculpture was one of the first works completed by Hepworth after the birth of her triplets with Ben Nicholson in October 1934. It marks a point of departure in her style: her earlier abstract works are based on the human form, but Three Forms is more purely abstract, reduced to simple geometric shapes with little colour. Her subsequent work continued in a more formal, abstract and non-representational vein. Hepworth wrote in 1952 that she became "absorbed in the relationships in space, in size and texture and weight, as well as the tensions between forms".

The work consists of three rounded elements positioned on a flat rectangular base, all in polished Seravezza marble (largely white, but small brown marks, grey flecks, and pale grey graining are visible on close inspection). Each element has a precise shape and size, and they are arranged in a similarly precise triangular relationship. The original base has been replaced, but the spatial arrangement of each element remains the same, with a spherical element placed at a distance from two larger and elongated oval forms, the smaller of which lies flat and the larger of which rests on its long edge, both aligned with the longer edge of the rectangular base. The 12 centimetres (4.7 in) diameter of the sphere reflects one of the dimensions of both larger elements, each of which also shares a dimension of 18 centimetres (7.1 in) (1.5 times as large). The medium spheroid measures 8.5 × 18 × 12 centimetres (3.3 × 7.1 × 4.7 in) and the larger one is 18 × 25.5 × 12 centimetres (7.1 × 10.0 × 4.7 in). Each object was shaped by hand and so is slightly imperfect. The choice of three forms - two alike and one different - may be connected with the birth of Hepworth's triplets - two girls and one boy.

The abstract sculpture in a pure white recalls the contemporary architecture of Le Corbusier, and may also have been inspired by Hepworth's visits to the studios of Brancusi and Arp on a visit to France with Nicholson in 1932. Hepworth later accepted criticism from physicist John Desmond Bernal that the elements are all positively curved, and suggested that the work could have been improved by the sphere being replaced by a cylinder.

The whole work measures 21 × 53.2 × 34.3 centimetres (8.3 × 20.9 × 13.5 in) and weighs 23 kilograms (51 lb). It was exhibited at the "7&5" exhibition in 1935 and the "Abstract and Concrete Art" exhibition in 1936. It was bought from Hepworth by Mr and Mrs JR Marcus Brumwell in late 1935, and they donated it to the Tate Gallery in 1964. It is now displayed at Tate Britain.
