= Norman Foster =

English architect (born 1935)

The Right Honourable The Lord Foster of Thames Bank OM RA HonFREng RDI
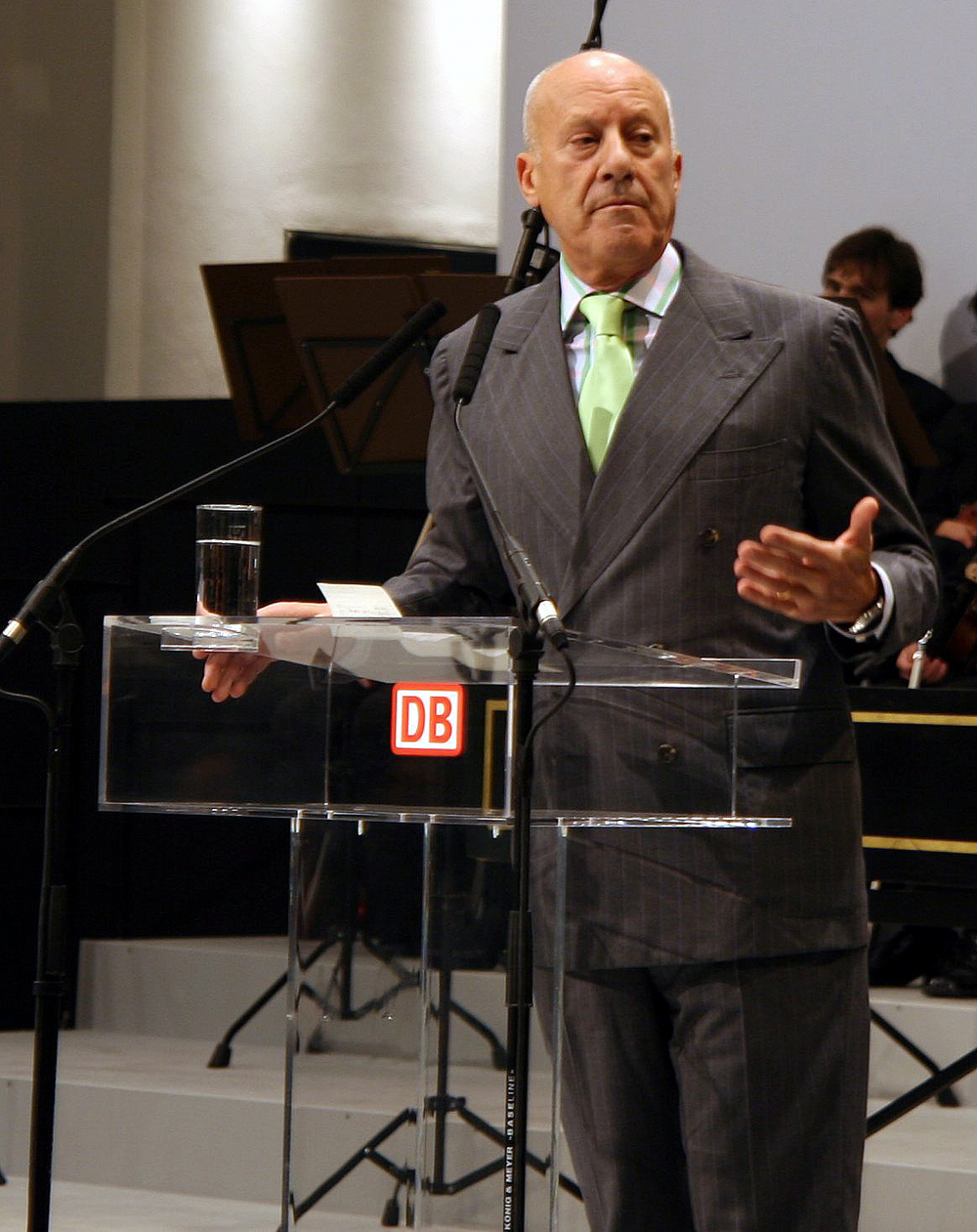
- Lord Foster in 2006
- Born: Norman Robert Foster; 1 June 1935 (age 91); Reddish, Stockport, England
- Education: University of Manchester; Yale University
- Occupation: Architect
- Spouses: Wendy Cheesman (m. 1964; died 1989) Begum Sabiha Rumani Malik (m. 1991; div. 1995) Elena Fernández-Ferreiro López de Ochoa (m. 1996)
- Children: 5
- Awards: Stirling Prize; Pritzker Architecture Prize; Praemium Imperiale; Minerva medal; Prince of Asturias Award; HonFREng; Mérite Européen Gold Medal; AIA Gold Medal
- Practice: Foster + Partners
- Buildings: Apple Park; 30 St Mary Axe; Willis Faber and Dumas Headquarters; Wembley Stadium; HSBC Building; Reichstag building
- Projects: American Air Museum at the Imperial War Museum Duxford

Member of the House of Lords
- Lord Temporal
- Life peerage 19 July 1999 – 6 July 2010
- Website: normanfosterfoundation.org

Norman Robert Foster, Baron Foster of Thames Bank (born 1 June 1935), is an English architect and urbanist. He is widely recognised as a seminal pioneer of high-tech architecture and a defining figure in British modernism. His structural steel-and-glass designs have fundamentally shaped late 20th- and early 21st-century urban landscapes worldwide.

Born into a working class family in Stockport, Foster studied architecture at the University of Manchester before earning a master's degree from the Yale School of Architecture. Upon returning to England, he co-founded the short-lived but highly influential architectural collective Team 4 alongside Richard Rogers. In 1967, he established Foster Associates—later rebranded as Foster + Partners—which has grown into the largest and most commercially successful architectural practice in the UK.

Foster achieved critical acclaim for early industrial and corporate structures, most notably the Willis Faber and Dumas Headquarters in Ipswich and the Sainsbury Centre for Visual Arts in Norwich. These projects pioneered open-plan internal structural grids and innovative curtain walling. His international breakthrough came in 1985 with the HSBC Building in Hong Kong, a revolutionary high-tech tower featuring a suspended structural steel framework. His subsequent portfolio includes some of the world's most recognisable post-modern landmarks, including the reconstructed glass Reichstag dome in Berlin, 30 St Mary Axe ("The Gherkin") and the Queen Elizabeth II Great Court of the British Museum in London, and the solar-powered Apple Park corporate campus in Cupertino, California.

In his later career, his focus has shifted significantly toward green urban density and urban planning through the Norman Foster Foundation and the Norman Foster Institute. He has received nearly every major accolade in the discipline, winning the RIBA Royal Gold Medal in 1983, the AIA Gold Medal in 1994, and the Pritzker Architecture Prize in 1999. He was knighted in 1990 and created a life peer in 1999.

His current works are required within the Design and Technology AQA GCSE syllabus

== Early life and education ==
Norman Robert Foster was born in 1935 in Reddish, two miles (3.2 km) north of Stockport, formerly a part of Lancashire but by then incorporated into the County Borough of Stockport. He was the only child of Robert and Lilian Foster (born Smith). The family moved to Levenshulme, a neighbouring suburb of Manchester, where they lived in poverty. His father was a machine painter at the Metropolitan-Vickers works in Trafford Park, which influenced Norman to take up engineering, design, and, ultimately, architecture. His mother worked in a local bakery. Foster's parents were diligent and hard workers who often had neighbours and family members look after their son, which Foster later believed restricted his relationship with his mother and father.

Foster attended Burnage Grammar School for Boys in Burnage, where he was bullied by fellow pupils and took up reading. He considered himself quiet and awkward in his early years. At 16, he left school and passed an entrance exam for a trainee scheme set up by Manchester Town Hall, which led to his first job, an office junior and clerk in the treasurer's department. In 1953, Foster completed his national service in the Royal Air Force, choosing the air force because aircraft had been a longtime hobby. Upon returning to Manchester, Foster went against his parents' wishes and sought employment elsewhere. He had seven O-levels by this time, and applied to work at a duplicating machine company, telling the interviewer he had applied for the prospect of a company car and a £1,000 salary. Instead, he became an assistant to a contract manager at a local architects, John E. Beardshaw and Partners. The staff advised him that if he wished to become an architect, he should prepare a portfolio of drawings using the perspective and shop drawings from Beardshaw's practice as an example. Beardshaw was so impressed with Foster's drawings that he promoted him to the drawing department.

In 1956 Foster began study at the School of Architecture and City Planning, part of the Victoria University of Manchester. He was ineligible for a maintenance grant, so he took part-time jobs to fund his studies, including an ice-cream salesman, bouncer, and night shifts at a bakery making crumpets. During this time, he also studied at the local library in Levenshulme. His talent and hard work was recognised in 1959 when he won £105 and a RIBA silver medal for what he described as "a measured drawing of a windmill". The windmill he drew was Bourn Windmill, Cambridgeshire. After graduating in 1961, Foster won the Henry Fellowship to the Yale School of Architecture in New Haven, Connecticut, where he met future business partner Richard Rogers and earned his master's degree. At the suggestion of Yale art historian Vincent Scully, the pair travelled across America for a year to study architecture.

== Career ==
=== 1960s–1980s ===
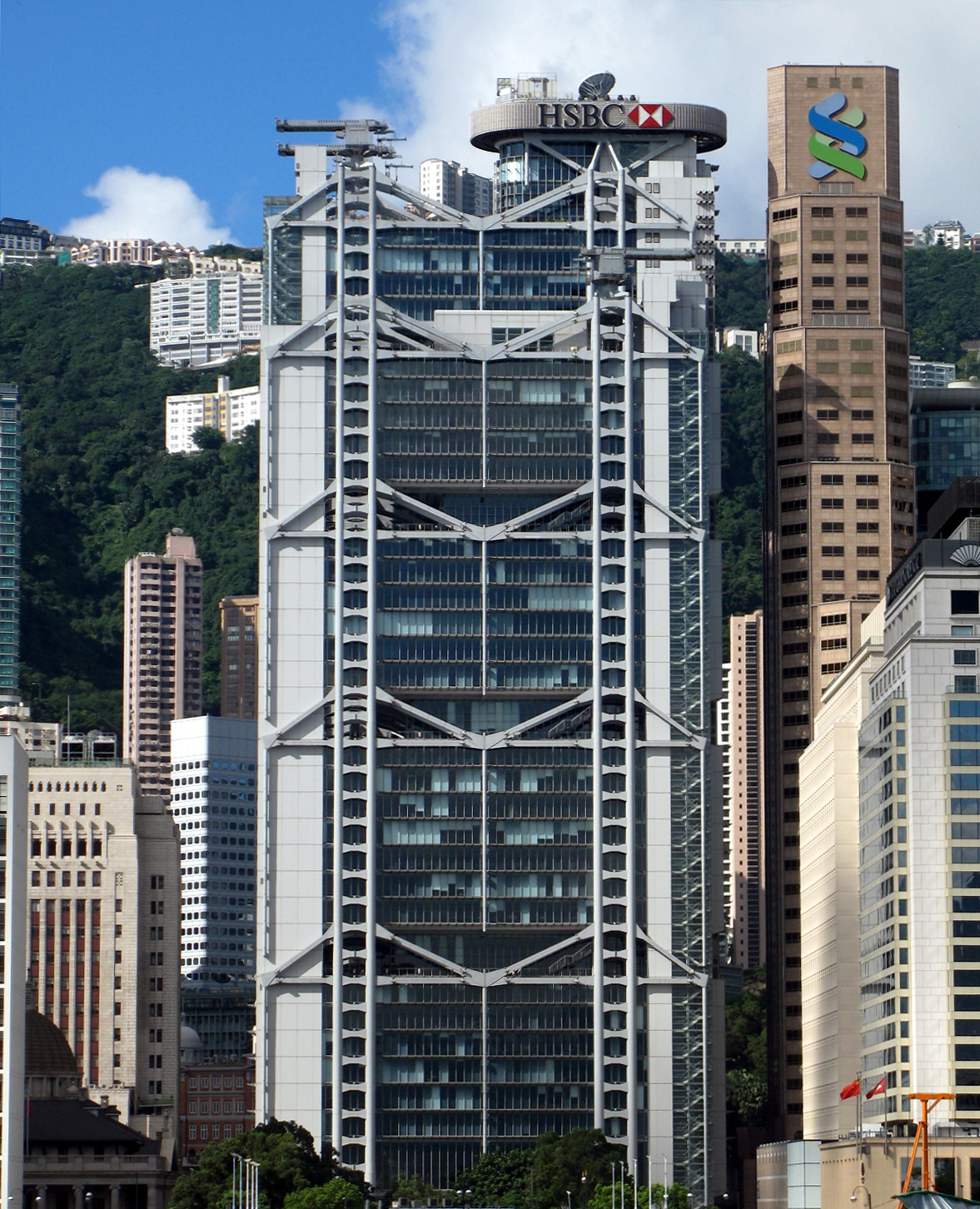
The HSBC Building in Hong Kong

In 1963 Foster returned to the UK and established his own architectural firm Team 4, with Rogers, Su Brumwell, and the sisters Georgie and Wendy Cheesman. Among their first projects was the Cockpit, a minimalist glass bubble installed in Cornwall, the features of which became a recurring theme in Foster's future projects. After the four separated in 1967, Foster and Wendy founded a new practice, Foster Associates. From 1968 to 1983, Foster collaborated with American architect Richard Buckminster Fuller on several projects that became catalysts in the development of an environmentally sensitive approach to design, such as the Samuel Beckett Theatre at St Peter's College, Oxford.

Foster Associates concentrated on industrial buildings until 1969, when the practice worked on the administrative and leisure centre for Fred. Olsen Lines based in the London Docklands, which integrated workers and managers within the same office space. This was followed, in 1970, by the world's first inflatable office building for Computer Technology Limited near Hemel Hempstead, which housed 70 employees for a year. The practice's breakthrough project in England followed in 1974 with the completion of the Willis Faber & Dumas headquarters in Ipswich, commissioned in 1970 and completed in 1975. The client, a family-run insurance company, wanted to restore a sense of community to the workplace. In response, Foster designed a space with modular, open plan office floors, long before open-plan became the norm, and placed a roof garden, 25-metre swimming pool, and gymnasium in the building to enhance the quality of life for the company's 1,200 employees. The building has a full-height glass façade moulded to the medieval street plan and contributes drama, subtly shifting from opaque, reflective black to a glowing back-lit transparency as the sun sets. The design was inspired by the Daily Express Building in Manchester that Foster had admired as a youngster. The building is now Grade I listed. The Sainsbury Centre for Visual Arts, an art gallery and museum on the campus of the University of East Anglia, Norwich, was one of the first major public buildings to be designed by Foster, completed in 1978, and became grade II* listed in December 2012.

In 1981, Foster received a commission for the construction of a new terminal building at London's Stansted Airport. Executed by Foster + Partners, the building, recognised as a landmark work of high-tech architecture, was opened to the public in 1991, and was awarded the 1990 European Union Prize for Contemporary Architecture / Mies van der Rohe Award. As part of the project's development, in 1988 Foster and British artist Brian Clarke made several proposals for an integral stained glass artwork for the terminal building; the principal proposal would have seen the walls of the terminal's east and west elevations clad in two sequences of traditionally mouth-blown, leaded glass. For complex technical and security reasons, the original scheme, which Clarke considered to be his magnum opus, couldn't be executed. Though unrealised, the collaboration is historically significant for its scale, its introduction of colour and materials broadly viewed as antithetical to high-tech architecture into a key work of that movement, and for having been the first time in the history of stained glass that computer-assisted design had been utilised in the creative process.

Foster gained a reputation for designing office buildings. In the 1980s he designed the HSBC Main Building in Hong Kong for the Hongkong and Shanghai Banking Corporation (a founding member of the future HSBC Holdings plc), at the time the most expensive building ever constructed. The building is marked by its high level of light transparency, as all 3500 workers have a view to Victoria Peak or Victoria Harbour. Foster said that if the firm had not won the contract it would probably have been bankrupted.

=== 1990s–present ===
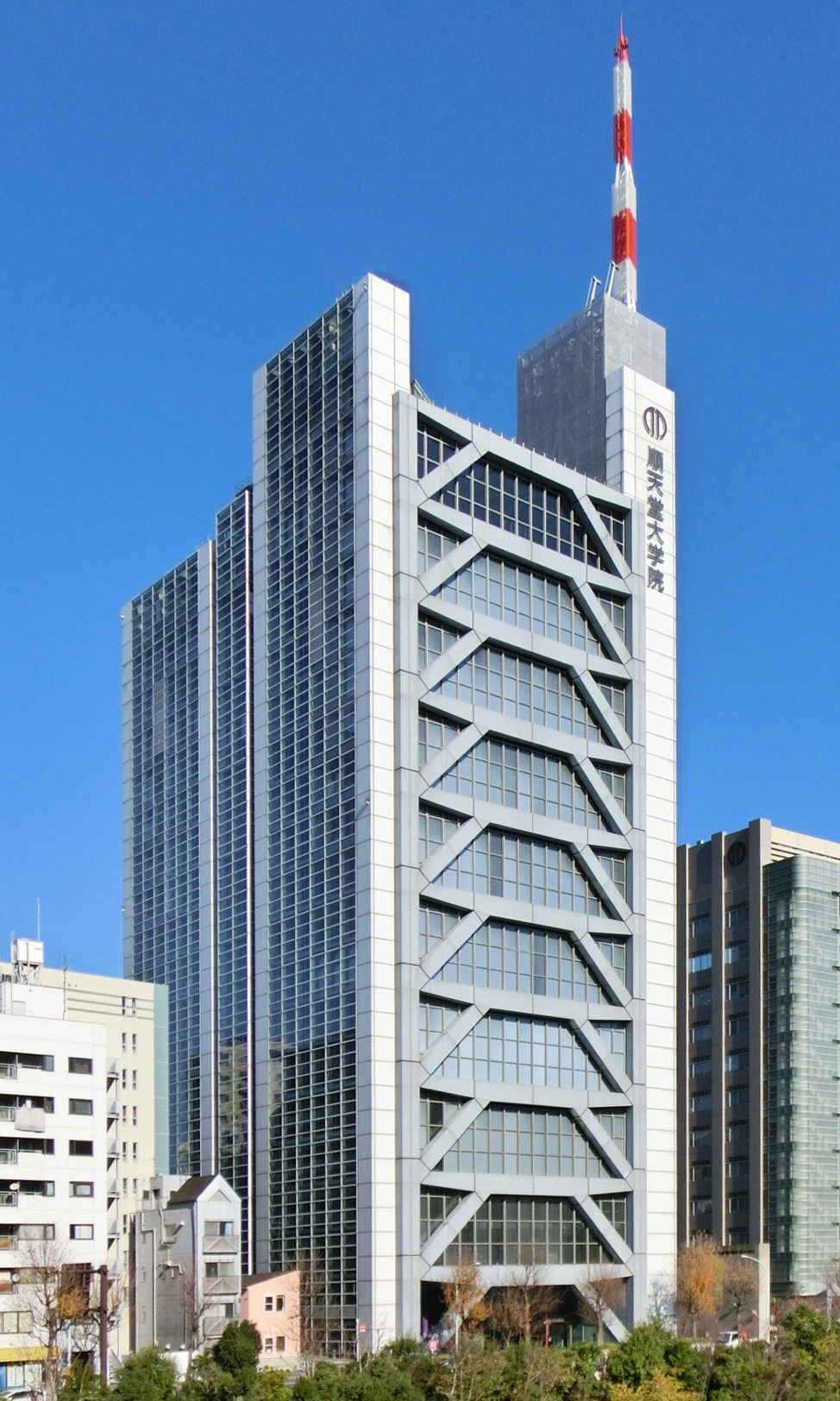
The Century Tower, built in 1991

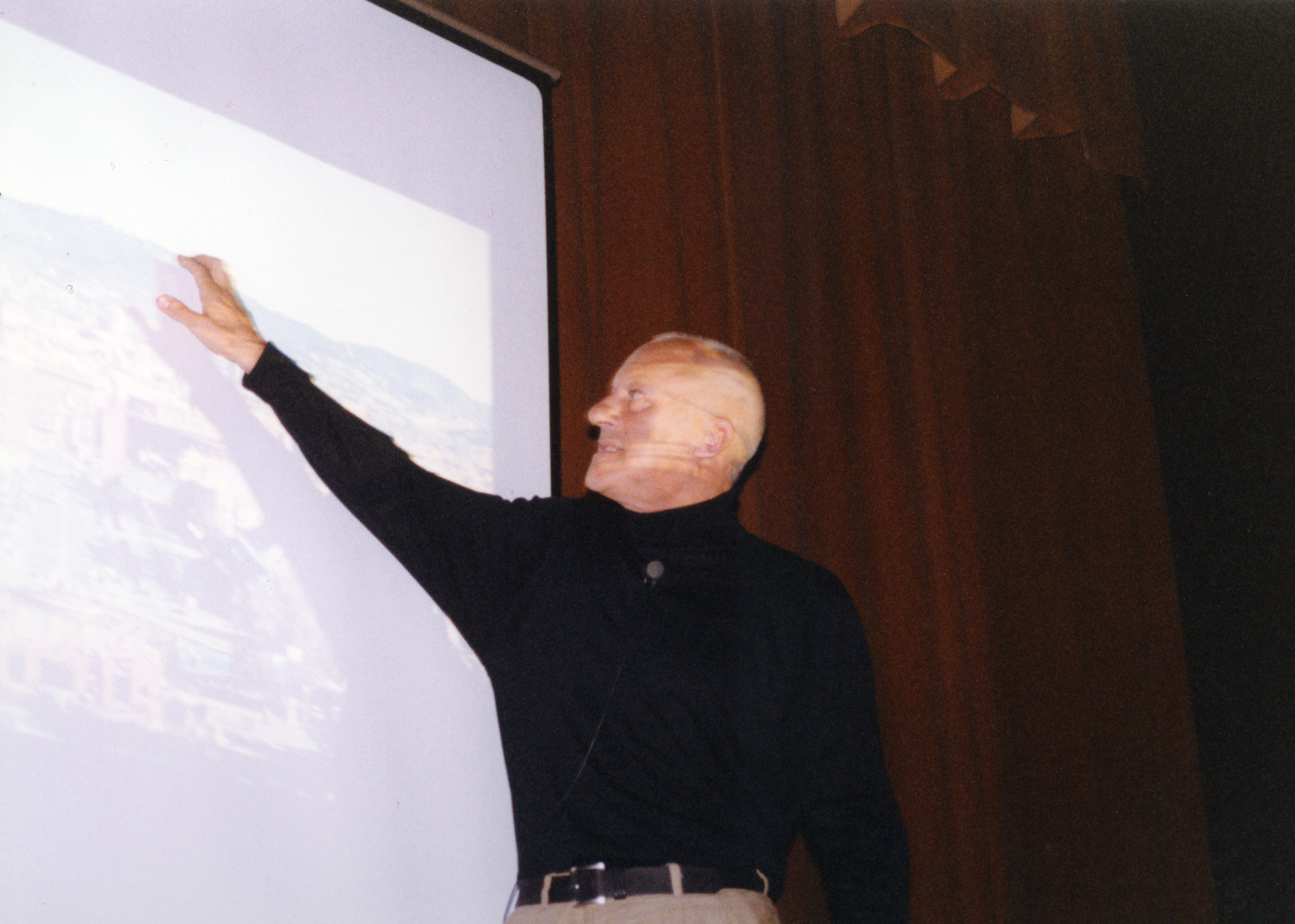
Foster lecturing in 2001

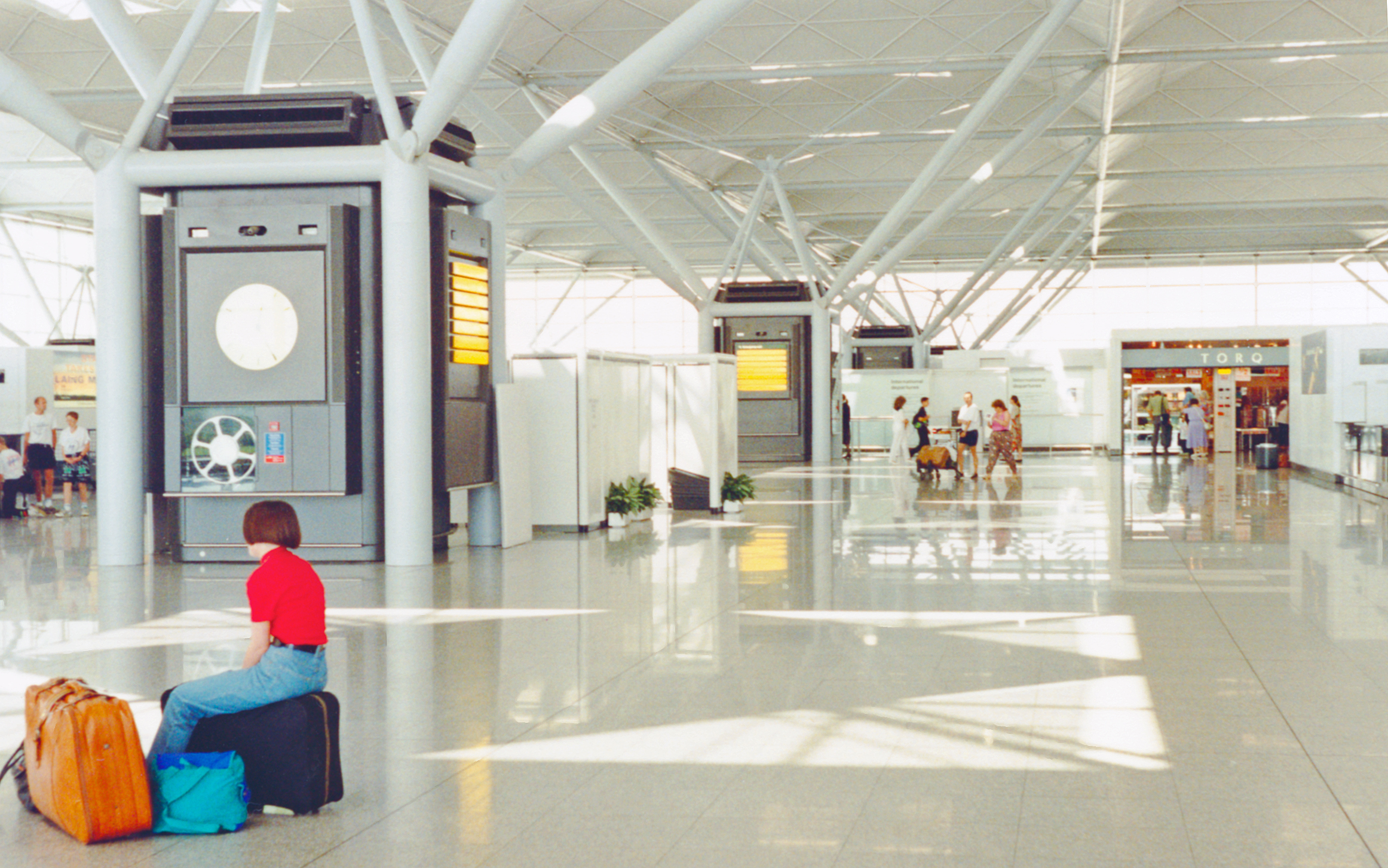
Inside the Stansted Airport terminal in 1992

Foster was assigned the brief for a development on the site of the Baltic Exchange, which had been damaged beyond repair by an IRA bomb, in the 1990s. Foster's firm submitted a plan for a 385-metre-tall (1,263 ft) skyscraper, the London Millennium Tower, but its height was seen as excessive for London's skyline. The proposal was scrapped and instead Foster proposed 30 St Mary Axe, popularly referred to as "the gherkin", after its shape. Foster worked with engineers to integrate complex computer systems with the most basic physical laws, such as convection. In 1999, the company was renamed Foster & Partners, which was then stylised as Foster + Partners from 2006 onwards.

By then, Foster's style had evolved from its earlier sophisticated, machine-influenced high-tech vision into a more sharp-edged modernity. In 2004, Foster designed the tallest bridge in the world, the Millau Viaduct in Southern France, with the Millau Mayor Jacques Godfrain stating; "The architect, Norman Foster, gave us a model of art."

Foster worked with Steve Jobs from about 2009 until Jobs' death to design the Apple offices, Apple Campus 2 (now called Apple Park), in Cupertino, California, US. Apple's board and staff continued to work with Foster as the design was completed and the construction in progress. The circular building was opened to employees in April 2017, six years after Jobs died in 2011.

In January 2007, the Sunday Times reported that Foster had called in Catalyst, a corporate finance house, to find buyers for Foster + Partners. Foster does not intend to retire, but rather to sell his 80–90% holding in the company valued at £300 million to £500 million. In 2007, he worked with Philippe Starck and Sir Richard Branson of the Virgin Group for the Virgin Galactic plans.

Foster currently sits on the board of trustees at architectural charity Article 25 who design, construct and manage innovative, safe, sustainable buildings in some of the most inhospitable and unstable regions of the world. He has also been on the Board of Trustees of The Architecture Foundation. Foster believes that attracting young talent is essential, and is proud that the average age of people working for Foster and Partners is 32, just like it was in 1967.

In May 2022, it was announced that Foster would help plan reconstruction in Ukraine after the end of the Russo-Ukrainian war.

By 2024, Foster + Partners earned more than $500 million in fees. 40% of Foster + Partner's fees were paid by clients in the Middle East.

In September 2025, Foster was awarded the London Design Festival's lifetime achievement medal.

== Personal life ==
=== Family ===
Foster has been married three times. His first wife, Wendy Cheesman, one of the four founders of Team 4, died from cancer in 1989. From 1991 to 1995, he was married to Begum Sabiha Rumani Malik; the marriage ended in divorce. In 1996, he married Spanish psychologist and art curator Elena Ochoa. He has five children; two of the four sons he had with Cheesman are adopted.

=== Health ===
In the 2000s, Foster was diagnosed with bowel cancer and was told he had only weeks to live. He underwent chemotherapy treatment and made a full recovery. He has also suffered a heart attack.

== Honours ==
Foster was made a Knight Bachelor in the 1990 Birthday Honours, granting him the title "Sir." He was appointed to the Order of Merit (OM) in 1997. In the 1999 Birthday Honours, it was announced that he would be elevated to the peerage, becoming Baron Foster of Thames Bank, of Reddish in the County of Greater Manchester in July.

He was elected an Associate of the Royal Academy (ARA) on 19 May 1983, and a Royal Academician (RA) on 26 June 1991. In 1995, he was elected an Honorary Fellow of the Royal Academy of Engineering (HonFREng). On 24 April 2017, he received the Freedom of the City of London. in October 2018, the Bloomberg London building received a Stirling Prize.

In 1986, he received an Honorary Doctorate from the University of Bath.

In 2002, he received Praemium Imperiale (The Prince Takamatsu Memorial World Culture Prize) Prize.

Foster was the recipient of the 2025 Lifetime Achievement Medal from the London Design Festival.

== Recognition ==
Foster received The Lynn S. Beedle Lifetime Achievement Award from the Council on Tall Buildings and Urban Habitat in 2007 to honour his contributions to the advancement of tall buildings.

He was awarded the Aga Khan Award for Architecture, for the University of Technology Petronas in Malaysia, and in 2008 he was granted an honorary degree from the Dundee School of Architecture at the University of Dundee. In 2009, he received the Prince of Asturias Award in the category 'Arts'. In 2017, he received the Golden Plate Award of the American Academy of Achievement presented by Awards Council member Lord Jacob Rothschild during the International Achievement Summit in London. In 2012, Foster was among the British cultural figures selected by artist Sir Peter Blake to appear in a new version of his most famous artwork – the Beatles' Sgt. Pepper's Lonely Hearts Club Band album cover – to celebrate the British cultural figures of his life that he most admires. He was awarded the 2025 Lifetime Achievement Medal by the London Design Festival.

== Selected works ==
- Canary Wharf tube station in London
- The Gherkin in London
- Reichstag Dome in Berlin
- Great Court of the British Museum
- Hearst Tower in New York
- Millennium Bridge in London
- HSBC Main Building in Hong Kong
- British Library of Political and Economic Science at the London School of Economics
- Chesa Futura in St. Moritz
- Carré d'Art in Nîmes
- Bilbao Metro
- McLaren Technology Centre, in Woking, England
- Apple Park at Cupertino, California
- JPMorgan's HQ at Manhattan, New York
- Hong Kong International Airport in Chep Lap Kok Hong Kong

== Arms ==
Coat of arms of Norman Foster
Crest A Pier of the Millennium Bridge over the River Thames proper. Escutcheon Azure on a pile reversed throughout engrailed argent a pile reversed throughout engrailed azure with five chevronels reversed or surmounted by a pile reversed throughout argent. Supporters On either side statant upon the base of a pier of the Millennium Bridge over the River Thames argent a heron sable. Motto The Only Constant Is Change Orders Order of Merit

== See also ==
- Peter Rice
- SkyCycle (proposed transport project)
- List of works by Norman Foster

Orders of precedence in the United Kingdom
Preceded by The Lord Rogan	Gentlemen; Baron Foster of Thames Bank	Followed by The Lord Lea of Crondall
