= Wendy Foster =

British architect (1937–1989)

- Born: Wendy Ann Cheesman; 1937
- Died: 15 January 1989 (aged 51)
- Education: Yale School of Architecture
- Occupation: Architect
- Spouse: Norman Foster (m. 1964)
- Children: 4
- Practice: Team 4 (1963–67); Foster Associates (1967–1989)
- Buildings: Creek Vean (Team 4), Sainsbury Centre for Visual Arts, Willis Faber and Dumas building, HSBC Building in Hong Kong (Foster Associates)

Wendy Ann Foster (née Cheesman; 1937 – 15 January 1989) was a British architect and co-founder of Team 4 and Foster Associates.

== Career ==
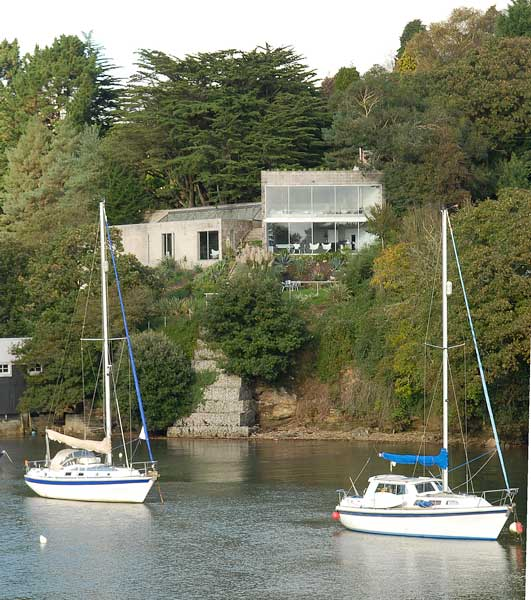
Creek Vean, Feock, Cornwall

Team 4 was an architectural firm, established in 1963 by architecture graduates Su Rogers (née Brumwell), Wendy Cheesman, Norman Foster and Richard Rogers. The firm originally included Wendy Cheesman's sister, Georgie Wolton, who, as the only qualified architect of the group, allowed the practice to function. Georgie Cheesman left after only a few months, leaving the remaining members to try to pass their professional exams while continuing to practise.

The notable buildings that she worked on while at Team 4 includes the first ever house to win a RIBA award – Creek Vean house, Feock, Cornwall, England (1966), Reliance Controls factory, Swindon (1967), Jaffe House (also known as Skybreak House), which was Humphrey Spender's house, Maldon, Essex (1965–1966) and Wates Housing, Coulsdon, Surrey (1965), all in England.

By June 1967, Foster and Rogers had decided to dissolve the firm. The Rogerses (Richard and Su) established Richard and Su Rogers Architects and the Fosters (Norman Foster and Wendy Foster, née Cheesman) established Foster Associates. The notable buildings that Wendy Foster was involved in include Sainsbury Centre for Visual Arts, Willis Faber and Dumas building, and the HSBC Building in Hong Kong.

== Influence ==
A new age of architecture, rooted in British Modernism, emerged in the late 1960s. Heavily influenced by new-age engineering practices, this high-tech style of architecture aimed to accentuate the building’s construction. This transformational era in the field of architecture was dominated by male designers, Norman Foster among them. However, what many fail to realize is the number of female architects who not only influenced, but helped the movement thrive. Wendy Foster, as a member of Team 4, aided in the design of the Reliance Controls factory–a manufacturing site for precision electronic tools–which became one of the first high-tech buildings in the United Kingdom. Her contributions to the movement were essential to its rise and the lasting fame of her and her partners’ firm.

== Personal life and death ==
Wendy Cheesman married Norman Foster in 1964. She died of cancer in 1989, aged 51, when she was still a partner/director at Foster Associates.

== See also ==
- List of British architects
