= Waagner-Biro =

Austrian group of engineering companies

Waagner Biro is a Vienna-based group of companies formerly part of the same group which have developed into separately owned, independent companies operating in steel and mechanical engineering. Collectively, the companies have about 1000 employees in various locations in Europe, Asia, and the Middle East.

== Businesses ==
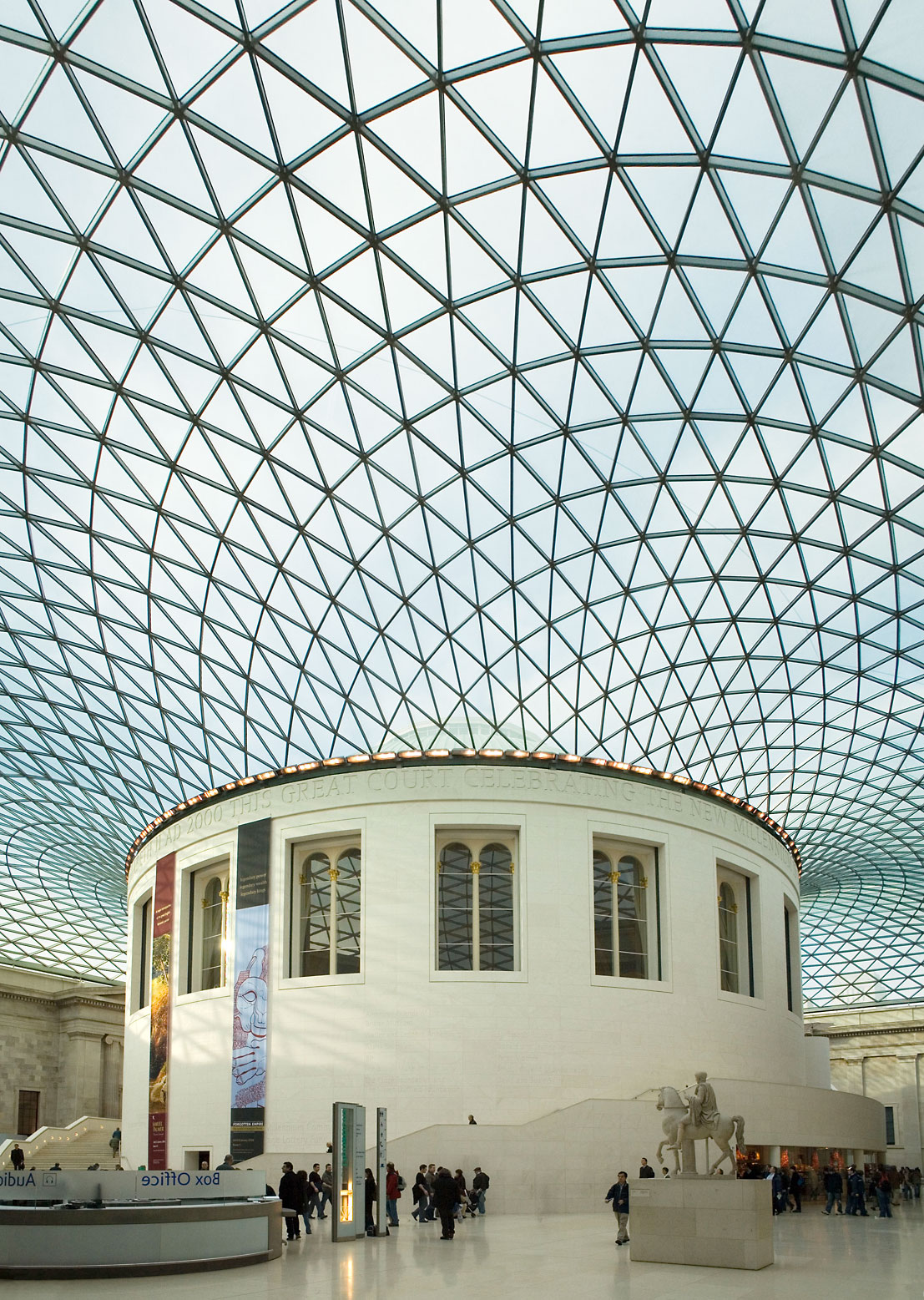
Tessellated roof of the Great Court of the British Museum, constructed by Waagner-Biro

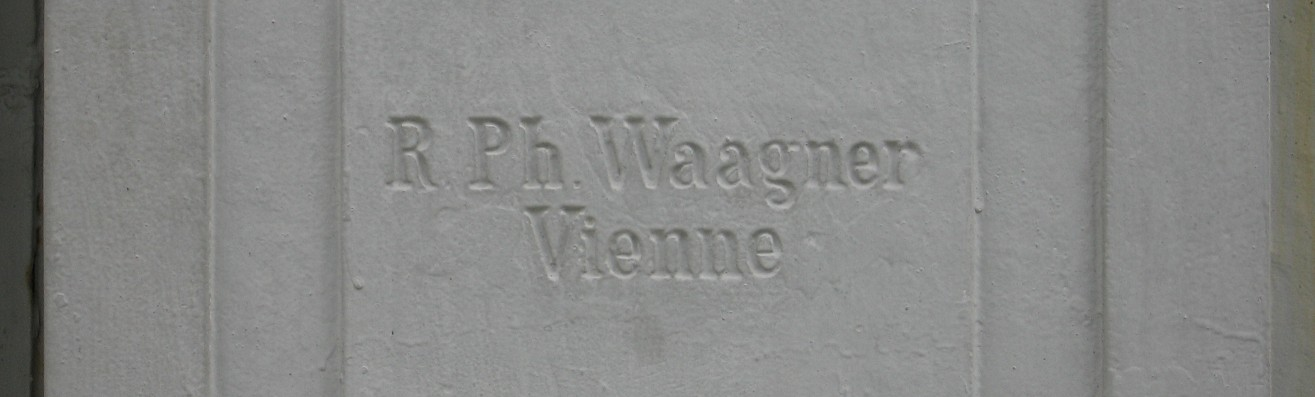
Inscription of the Bulgarian St Stephen Church in Istanbul

Waagner Biro Steel and Glass has divisions in steel and glass engineering and facade construction in Austria, United Kingdom and United Arab Emirates.

Waagner Biro Steel Bridge Systems specialises in bridge construction.

Waagner-Biro Stage Systems Group is a major manufacturer of stage equipment.

== History ==
On October 16, 1854, the Vienna city magistrate granted Rudolph Philipp Waagner an "Iron trade authorisation". That same year, Anton Biró and Albert Milde & Co. merged. The company first used the name Waagner-Biro in 1924.

In 1906, the company provided the Vienna State Opera with stage equipment. Forty years later, the company rebuilt the opera house's roof. Other roof projects include Vienna's Stephansdom in 1948, the Munich Olympic facilities in 1969, the Prater Stadium in Vienna in 1985, and the Reichstag dome in Berlin, for which the company won a European Steel Design award in 1999. Waagner-Biro won another award in 2003 for the British Museum's Queen Elizabeth II Great Court.

Between 1910 and 1932, the company completed Schweden Bridge, Floridsdorf Bridge, Frieden Bridge, Augarten Bridge, and other bridges in Vienna. Other bridges built by Waagner-Biro include Europa Bridge in Innsbruck, Austria in 1962, North Bridge in Vienna in 1964, and bridges over the Danube River in the Vienna districts of Floridsdorf in 1979 and Brigittenau in 1980.

In 1960, Waagner-Biro worked on stage engineering for Sydney Opera. The Waagner-Biro process for cooling and quenching hot coke was introduced in the 1970s.

In 1982, the Dubai branch office opened. In 2000, Waagner-Biro Gulf LLC was established.

In 2003, the stage engineering companies went under the name Stage Systems.

In 2019, following the insolvency of the Waagner Biro Group, the group of companies devolved into separate entities, all of which use the trade name Waagner Biro. The three new companies formed are Stage Systems, Bridge Systems and Steel and Glass.

Waagner Biro Stage Systems is now owned by Austrian entrepreneur Erhard Grossnigg, whilst Waagner Biro Steel and Glass was acquired by Alheya Holding Group, based in Abu Dhabi.

In 2020, Waagner Biro Steel and Glass in Europe and the UK were acquired by the Zeman Group, along with a 49% stake in the UAE business (with Alheya Holdings retaining 51% ownership in the UAE).

In 2021, Waagner Biro Steel and Glass in Europe acquired 100% stake in the UAE business - Waagner Biro Emirates Contracting LLC.

== Projects ==
- Lärchwandschrägaufzug, High Tauern National Park, Austria (1952)
- Torre Espacial, Ciudad Buenos Aires, Argentina, (1979)
- Tunnelbahn Fleißalm, Skigebiet Großglockner Heiligenblut, Austria, (1987)
- Reichstag dome at Reichstag building, Berlin, Germany (1993)
- Sony Center, Berlin, Germany (2000)
- Great Court at British Museum, London, United Kingdom (2001)
- Red Bull Hangar-7, Salzburg, Austria (2003)
- Tower Place, London, United Kingdom (2003)
- Copenhagen Opera House, Copenhagen, Denmark (2004)
- Ascot Racecourse, Ascot, United Kingdom (2005)
- Złote Tarasy, Warsaw, Poland (2007)
- Koncerthuset, Copenhagen, Denmark (2008)
- Dubai Festival City, Dubai, United Arab Emirates (2008 & 2016)
- Yas Marina Hotel, Abu Dhabi, United Arab Emirates (2009)
- Capital Gate, Abu Dhabi, United Arab Emirates (2011)
- Estrella–Pantaleon Bridge, Metro Manila, Philippines (2011)
- Cour Visconti, Louvre, Paris, France (2011)
- One Angel Square, Manchester, United Kingdom (2012)
- Heydar Aliyev International Airport, Baku, Azerbaijan (2013)
- Blavatnik School of Government, Oxford, United Kingdom (2015)
- Maersk Tower, Panum Building, Copenhagen, Denmark (2016)
- Etihad Museum, Dubai, United Arab Emirates (2016)
- Louvre Abu Dhabi, Abu Dhabi, United Arab Emirates (2018)
- Jakarta LRT, Jakarta, Indonesia (2025‒2026)
