= Reichstag dome =

Glass dome on top of the Reichstag building in Berlin, Germany

Coordinates: 52°31′07″N 13°22′34″E

The Reichstag glass dome in 2019

Interior of the dome in 2004

The Reichstag dome is a glass dome constructed on top of the rebuilt Reichstag building in Berlin, Germany. It was designed by architect Norman Foster, from an idea of Gottfried Böhm, and built by Waagner-Biro to symbolize the reunification of Germany. The distinctive appearance of the dome has made it a prominent landmark in the city.

== Design ==
The Reichstag dome is a large glass dome with a 360° view of the surrounding Berlin cityscape. The debating chamber of Germany's parliament, the Bundestag, is visible directly below. A mirrored cone in the center of the dome directs sunlight into the building, and so that visitors can see the working of the chamber. The dome is open to the public and can be reached by climbing two steel spiralling ramps reminiscent of a double helix.

The glass dome was also designed by Foster to be environmentally friendly and energy efficient; in allowing daylight to shine through the mirrored cone, the use of artificial lighting is significantly reduced, and thus so are carbon emissions. A large sun shield tracks the movement of the sun electronically and blocks direct sunlight which, would not only cause large solar gain, but also dazzle those below.

The futuristic and transparent design of the Reichstag dome is intended to symbolize Berlin's attempt to move away from a past of Nazism and instead towards a future with a heavier emphasis on a united, democratic Germany. Specifically, it symbolizes that the people are above the government, as was not the case during Nazism.

== Construction ==
Spiral walkway inside the glass dome

With the reunification of Germany and the decision to move the capital from Bonn back to Berlin, it was also decided that the original Reichstag building should be rebuilt along with a new dome that emphasized a unified Germany. Architect Norman Foster won a commission to design and rebuild the Reichstag in 1993. Foster originally wanted a parasol-esque building, but his original design was rejected, partly due to the unrealistic costs. The design of the dome was at first controversial, but has become accepted as one of Berlin's most important landmarks. It derives from a design by Gottfried Böhm, who had previously suggested a cupola of glass with visitors walking on spiral ways to the top in 1988. His design was added to the information of the competition in 1992, which was won by Foster. Later the Bundestag decided that a cupola had to be built and Foster consequently gave up his resistance against it. Foster reused the idea of a spiral walkway within a conical structure for his design for City Hall in London some years later.

The dome was designed and constructed by Austrian steel and glass specialists Waagner-Biro. The steel and glass were joined by using silicone.

== Original dome ==
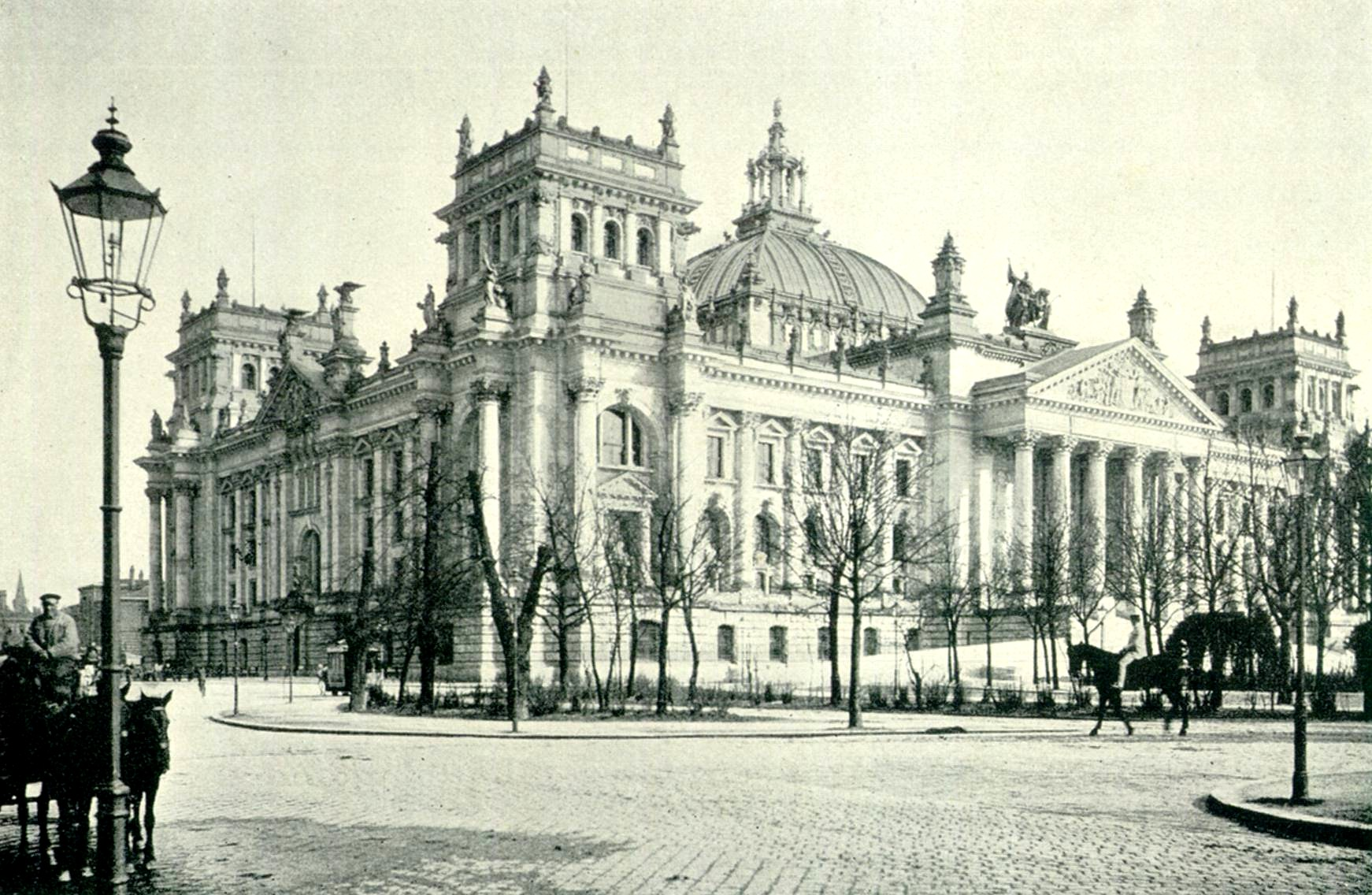
The Reichstag before the war with original dome in 1895

The original Reichstag building was proposed due to a need for a larger parliamentary building. Construction did not immediately begin due to debates between Otto von Bismarck and Reichstag members. In 1894, after an architectural contest, the winner, Frankfurt architect Paul Wallot, was chosen to design the building, which featured a very large dome.

On February 27, 1933, the plenary chamber of the Reichstag building was destroyed in the Reichstag fire, an act blamed on the Communists, despite there being little evidence to determine who actually started the fire. The remains of the building and the dome were further demolished with the bombings of Berlin through World War II and the eventual fall of Berlin to the Soviets in 1945. While the Reichstag building was partially reconstructed in the 1960s as a conference center, the dome was not. Much of the dome and the ornaments that decorated it had been removed by that time.

== See also ==
- Symbolism of domes
