= Georgie Wolton =

British architect (1934–2021)

- Born: Georgina Cheesman; 1934
- Died: 25 August 2021 (aged 87)
- Education: Architectural Association
- Occupation: Architect
- Practice: Team 4 (1963)
- Buildings: Cliff Road Studios, London

Georgie Wolton (née Cheesman; February 1934 – 25 August 2021) was a British architect, an original member of the architecture firm Team 4. Critic Jonathan Meades describes her as the "outstanding woman architect of the generation before Zaha [Hadid]".

== Biography ==
Georgina Cheesman was brought up in Surrey. She inherited wealth that made her able to design and build for herself, rather than paying clients. She initially studied at Epsom School of Art, where she met and influenced Richard Rogers. They had a relationship for several years. She became interested in architecture, encouraging her younger sister Wendy to take it up and then started to train herself.

Georgie Cheesman trained at the Architectural Association at the same time as Rogers, helping him with his draughtsmanship. During her travels to the United States became a fan of the Eames House and Philip Johnson's Glass House.

Together with her younger sister, Wendy, she was a founding member in 1963 of the architectural firm, Team 4, together with Su Brumwell, Norman Foster and Richard Rogers. As the only qualified architect in the group, she effectively enabled the practice to operate. Wolton left the practice after a few months, leaving the others to pass their professional exams. She had also supported Team 4 financially.

Wolton went on to practise on her own, her most well known works being Cliff Road Studios in Lower Holloway, London, and The River Cafe garden in Hammersmith. They both date from the late 1960s. Wolton also designed Fieldhouse in East Horsley, Surrey, with an experimental use of CorTen steel. She also designed a home for herself in Belsize Lane in North London. This was single storey with a glass roof and designed for light to move round the building during the day. The combined house and studio, built in 1975–76, was awarded Grade II listed status in October 2023 by Historic England, who described it as "meticulously conceived" and "creatively integrate[d] into its sensitive urban setting" and praised the "subtle handling of spatial proportion and natural light" inside. Meades suggests Wolton was "at the head of the very earliest vanguard of that tendency... that tirelessly reworks the forms of early modernism to the point where they are hardly distinguishable from their models." She designed these works were for herself or her family.

While reviewing the book Guide to the Architecture of London architectural critic Owen Hatherley described Wolton as "an exceptionally rare woman" in a group of architects who "tried to continue some form of modern classicism" during the 1970s and 80s.

Wolton later developed her passion for garden design and was a successful if unqualified landscape architect. She designed a garden for the Thames-side complex of offices at Thames Wharf, Hammersmith, London of Richard Rogers architectural practice and The River Cafe restaurant for Ruth Rogers. She also designed gardens for private clients including Dartington College of Arts in Devon, Keble College, Oxford, and the University of East Anglia.

She married, although later divorced, and they had a daughter. She died on 25 August 2021 at the age of 87.

== Notable buildings ==
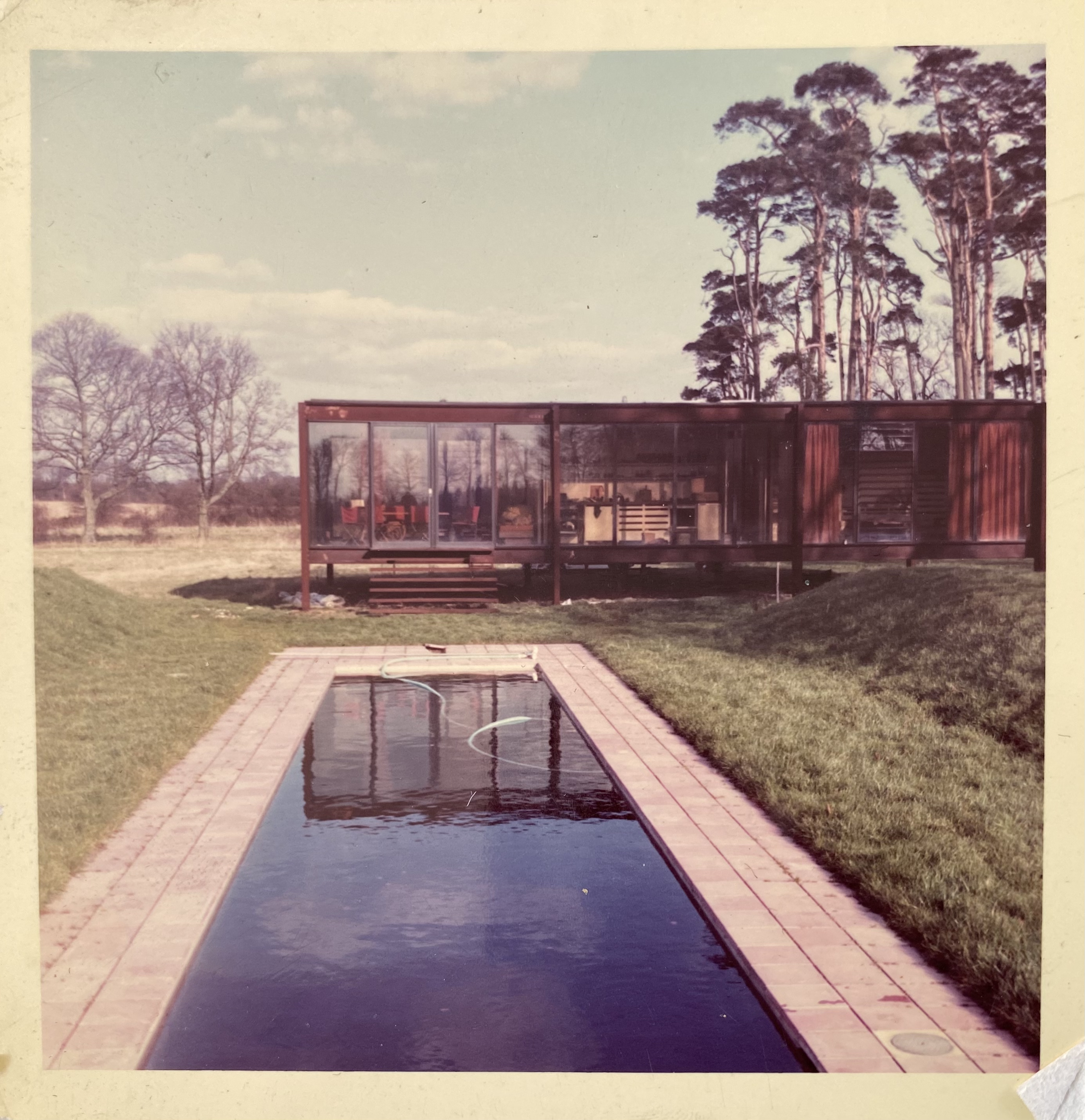
The Fieldhouse

- Cliff Road Studios, Lower Holloway, London (1968–71)
- The Fieldhouse, Crocknorth Farm, Surrey (1969, dismantled c. 1993) – the first house in the UK to use CorTen as a primary structure.
- 34 Belsize Lane, Hampstead (1976) – architect's own single-storey house.
