= Willis Building, Ipswich =

Landmark office building in Ipswich

Willis Building
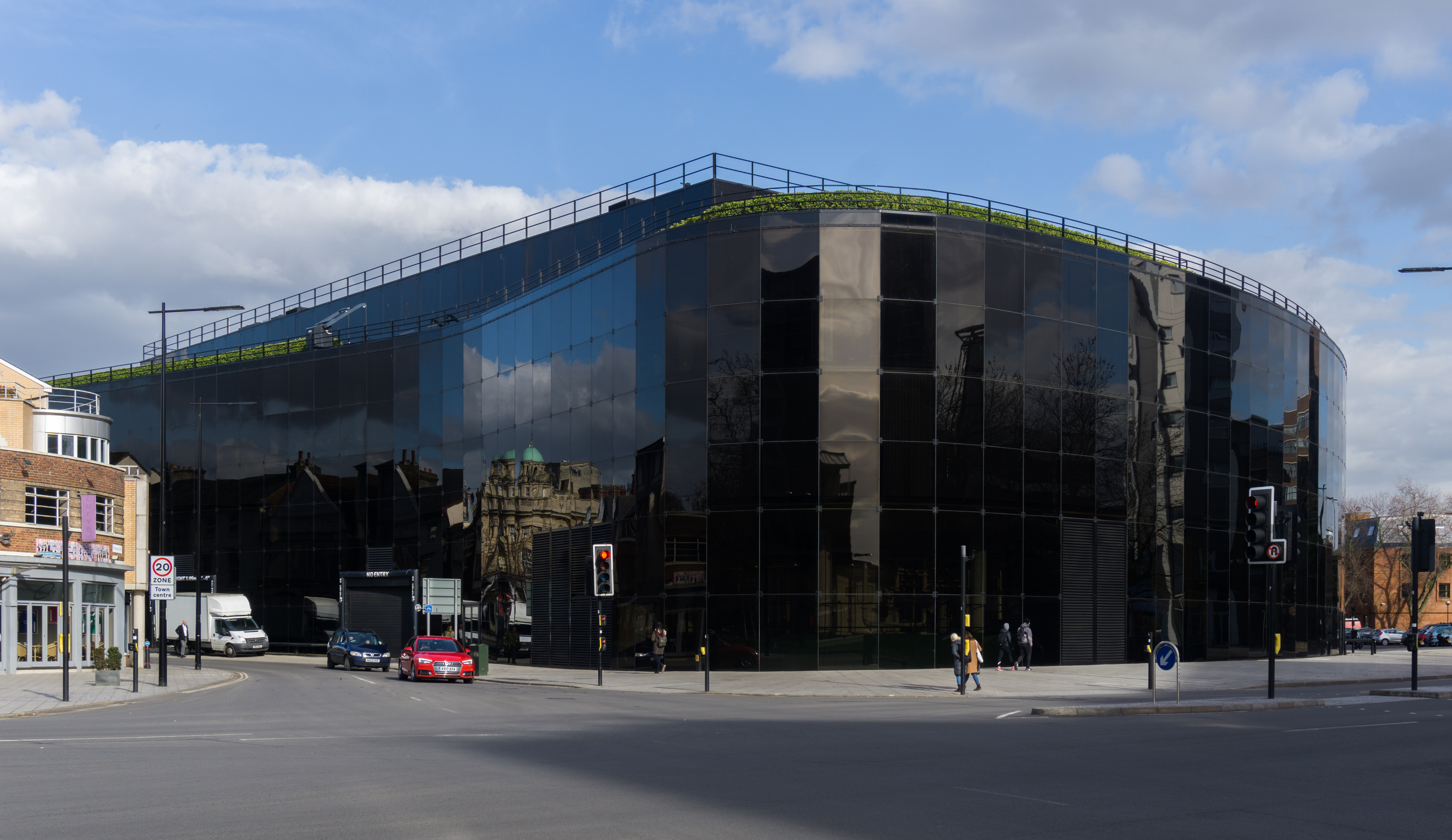
- The Willis Building, Ipswich

General information
- Type: Office
- Architectural style: High-tech architecture
- Location: Ipswich, Suffolk, England
- Coordinates: 52.0556°N 1.1507°E
- Construction started: 1970
- Completed: 1975
- Opened: 2 June 1975
- Client: Willis, Faber and Dumas
- Owner: Halo Service Solutions

Technical details
- Structural system: Reinforced-concrete frame

Design and construction
- Architect: Foster Associates
- Structural engineer: Anthony Hunt Associates
- Designations: Grade I listed building (25 April 1991)

The Willis Building (originally the Willis Faber & Dumas regional headquarters) is a Grade I listed office building in Ipswich, Suffolk, designed by Norman Foster and Wendy Cheesman after establishing Foster Associates.

Constructed between 1970 and 1975 for the insurance firm now known as Willis Towers Watson, it is widely considered a landmark in the development of the 'high tech' architectural style. The building houses some 1,300 office staff in open-plan offices spread over three floors.

== Location ==
The bulbous floor plan of the office block reflects the layout of the available site in the centre of Ipswich, which is sandwiched between several road junctions and the Grade I listed Unitarian Meeting House. Thus two of the town's Grade I listed buildings stand side by side.

== Design ==
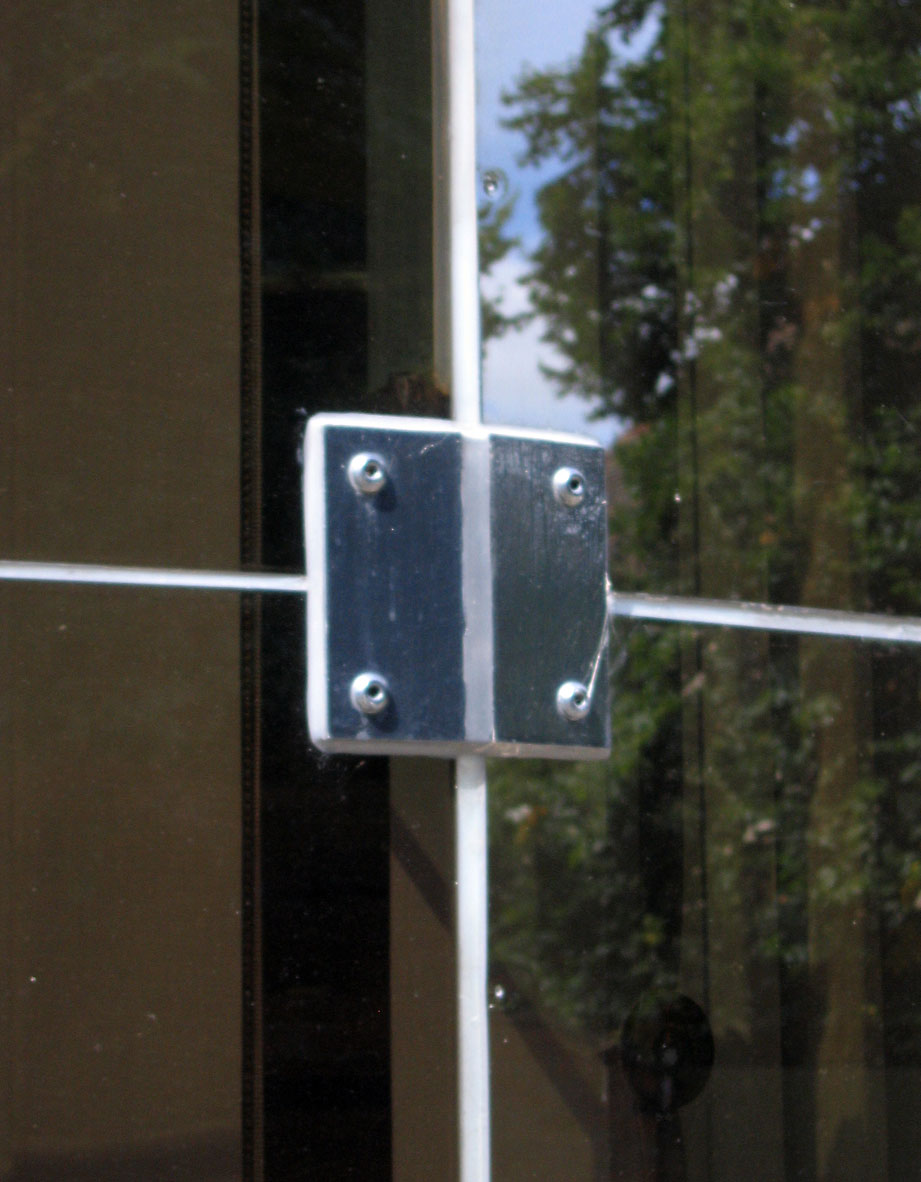
Window support detail.

The centre of the building is constructed from a grid of concrete pillars, 14 m (46 ft) apart, supporting cantilevered concrete slab floors. The curtain wall exterior is clad in panels of dark smoked glass. The use of dark glass, a curtain wall and lack of right angle corners mirrors the art deco Express Building in Manchester, cited by Norman Foster as one of his favourite buildings and a design influence. The central escalator well leads up to a rooftop staff restaurant surrounded by a rooftop garden (360 panorama). The interior floors are green and the walls are painted yellow, inspired by the colours of the outside environment.

The office had a ground-floor swimming pool that was covered over (but not filled in) in 1994 to provide more floor space. The former pool remains visible beneath the false floor.

== History ==
The Willis Building was commissioned by John Roscoe, chairman of Willis, Faber & Dumas, in the early 1970s.

The architectural firm of Norman Foster was selected after a shortlist was provided by the Royal Institute of British Architects. Foster's design, inspired by a glass-clad office building he had recently completed, featured innovative energy-conscious elements and open-plan floor spaces. The building was officially opened on June 2, 1975, by former Prime Minister Harold Macmillan.

In 1991 the Willis building became the newest building to be given Grade I listed building status in Britain. At the time it was one of only two listed buildings under 30 years of age.

The Willis building was bought by Stowmarket-based technology company Halo in 2026 to become their global HQ. Halo staff moved into the building on the 28th September 2026, sharing the office space with now tenant, WTW.

== See also ==
- Green roof
- High-tech architecture
- List of Grade I listed buildings in Suffolk
- List of tallest buildings and structures in Ipswich
- Willis Building (London)
