= Team 4 =

British architectural firm (1963–1967)

- Team 4 Clockwise from top left: Anthony Hunt, Frank Peacock, Maurice Phillips, Norman Foster, Su Brumwell, Richard Rogers, Wendy Cheesman and Sally Appleby.

Practice information
- Firm type: Partnership
- Key architects: Georgie Wolton (1963), John Young (1966–1967)
- Founders: Su Brumwell, Wendy Cheesman, Norman Foster, Richard Rogers and Georgie Wolton
- Founded: 1963
- Dissolved: June 1967

Significant works and honors
- Buildings: Creek Vean (1966) Feock, Cornwall, The Retreat, Creek Vean (1966), Feock, Cornwall, Reliance Controls factory (1967) Swindon, Skybreak House (aka Jaffe House) (1966), Radlett, Hertfordshire
- Design: Planned the Wates Housing Project (1967) Coulsdon, Surrey.

Team 4 was a British architectural firm, established in 1963 by architecture graduates Su Brumwell, Wendy Cheesman, Norman Foster and Richard Rogers. Friction emerged within the firm, and by June 1967, Foster and Rogers decided to dissolve the firm.

The practice originally included Wendy Cheesman's sister Georgie Wolton (née Cheesman) who, as the only qualified architect of the group, allowed the practice to function. Georgie Cheeseman left after only a few months, leaving the remaining members to try to pass their professional exams while continuing to practice.

Rogers, Foster and Brumwell had first met while studying at Yale University. Rogers and Brumwell later married, as did Foster and Cheesman.

== Projects ==
All projects that Team 4 worked on were based in England.

=== Notable projects ===
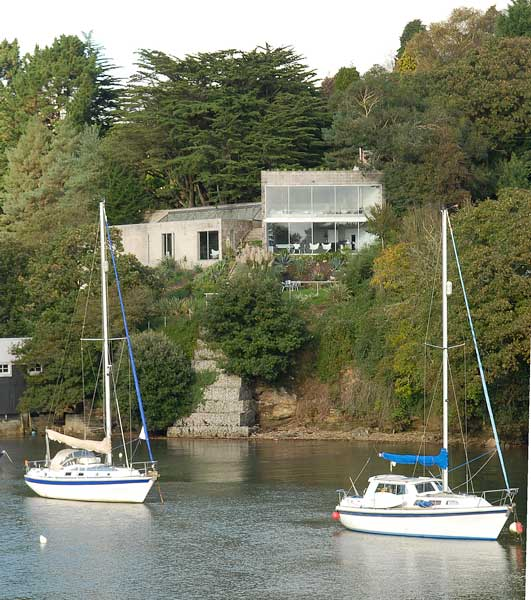
Creek Vean in 2006

One of the first projects for Team 4 was a commission from Su Brumwell's parents, Marcus and Irene Brumwell, to build a new house in Feock, Cornwall, called Creek Vean. They sold a Piet Mondrian painting, bought from the artist in the 1930s, to fund the new house. Marcus Brumwell was the founder of the Design Research Unit. Creek Vean took three years to construct and was completed in 1966. It became the first ever house to win a Royal Institute of British Architects Award. Creek Vean is a listed building, having been listed Grade II in 1998, and subsequently upgraded to Grade II*. It is listed as "Creekvean and Attached Entrance Bridge and Walls to Road, Feock".

Team 4 designed Skybreak House in Radlett, Hertfordshire. It was built between 1965 and 1966, and the interior was used in the film A Clockwork Orange. It is also known as the new house at Cushy, The Warren, Radlett.

Rogers claims a planning scheme of 120 houses for Water Homes, at Coulsdon, Surrey, to be "probably the most important project of our Team 4 period".

The final project for Team 4 was the Reliance Controls building in Swindon, which was completed in 1967, just before Team 4 dissolved. It was noteworthy as it removed the separation of management and workforce by creating a common entrance and canteen.

=== Other projects ===
- Homefield Preparatory School, Surrey
- Garage for Mr. Hammill at the Manor School Lane, Chellaston, Derbyshire
- Conversion, Haslemere Road, London
- Scott’s Showroom, London
- Morley City Centre, West Yorkshire (a collaboration between Team 4 and John E. Beardshaw & Partners)
- Restaurant Conversion, High Street, Barnet
- Murray Mews, Camden Square, London
- New House at Virginia Water, Surrey
- Fletcher and Stewart Office Building, Litchurch Lane, Derby
- Annexe and Alterations to Cothelstone, Forest Road, East Horsley, Surrey
- Extension to F.H.K. Henrion Studio, 35 Pond Street, Hampstead, London

=== After Team 4 ===
Foster and Cheesman would later establish Foster Associates, which is now known as Foster and Partners. Richard Rogers and Su Brumwell would go onto establish Richard and Su Rogers Architects, and later Piano + Rogers Architects, while Richard Rogers alone would go onto establish the Richard Rogers Partnership, which is now known as RSHP.

== See also ==
- List of architecture firms
