= Marcus Brumwell =

British advertising executive and designer (1901–1983)

John Robert Marcus Brumwell CBE FRSA (20 April 1901 – January 1983) was a British advertising pioneer, designer, businessman, political activist, and art collector.

== Advertising ==
Marcus joined H. Stuart Menzies's small advertising agency, Stuart's, in 1924, and by 1926 was its company secretary. Brumwell was later partner, specialising in liaising with contemporary artists, bringing in Edward Bawden, Edward McKnight Kauffer, Ben Nicholson, Barbara Hepworth, and others to work on projects, and helping the agency grow greatly. Brumwell took over as the managing director of Stuart's when Menzies retired in 1938.

In 1943, Brumwell co-founded the influential Design Research Unit design consultancy with artists Misha Black and Milner Gray in 1943, after conversations with Herbert Read, who was the agency's first hire. The DRU led key parts of the Festival of Britain in 1951 and dozens of other commissions. Brumwell also worked with the related social research agency Mass-Observation from 1937 onward, which shared offices with the DRU.

== Science policy ==
Alongside art and design, Brumwell pushed for good communication between scientists, artists, and political movements. In 1944 he brought together as editor a collection of essays by famous thinkers of the day, This Changing World, which included input from Read, Waddington and others.

Brumwell established in the early 1950s through informal dinner parties a "group of VIP scientists", where his friends in science like Waddington, Blackett, and Bernal met together with elites in other fields like academics like Charles Frederick Carter and C. P. Snow, and Harold Wilson and Richard Crossman in politics. Brumwell's cause notably escalated in the late 1950s, where these discussions led to a short document, A Labour Government and Science, published in 1959, which driven by Wilson became the Labour Party's basic policy science in the run up to the general election in 1964, most famously in the "white heat of technology" speech in September 1963.

Arising from this work, Brumwell helped found the related Science of Science Foundation in 1964 (later the Science Policy Foundation and then the International Science Policy Foundation), and served on its Advisory Council until his death. The SSF, led by Maurice Goldsmith, pushed for domestic and later international governmental interest in science and technology policy and its practical implementation, including publishing the Science and Public Policy journal.

== Art ==
Brumwell personally invested heavily in art, commissioning his home in Cornwall which in 1969 was the first private house to win a RIBA award, and collecting included significant numbers of works by friends such as Ben Nicholson, Henry Moore, Alexander Calder, Bernard Leach, and notably Barbara Hepworth, including Three Forms which he gave to the Tate in 1964.

== Personal life, honours and awards, and death ==
Brumwell and his wife Irene Strachan had a daughter, Su Brumwell (later Su Rogers, now Su Miller), who similarly went into architecture, and co-founded Team 4.

Brumwell was a Fellow of the Royal Society of Arts from 1950, and was awarded their Bicentenary Medal for 1968. He was appointed a Commander of the Order of British Empire in the Queen's Silver Jubilee and Birthday Honours in June 1977, "for services to art and industrial design".

Brumwell died in January 1983.
