= Queen Elizabeth II Great Court =

Space in the British Museum, London

Coordinates: 51°31′10″N 0°7′37″W

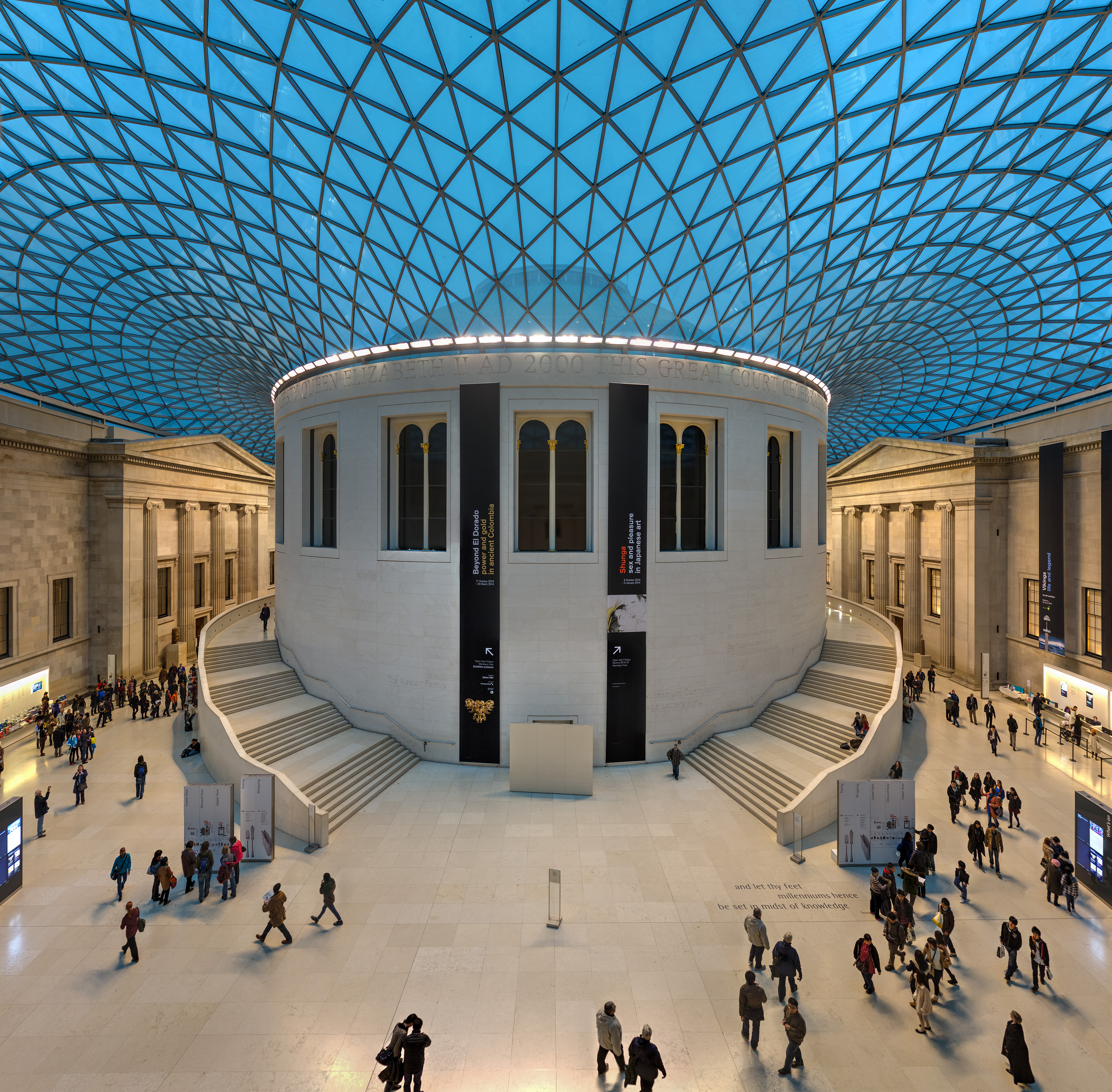
View of the Great Court from the second floor of the southern wing

The Queen Elizabeth II Great Court, commonly referred to simply as the Great Court, is the covered central quadrangle of the British Museum in London. It was redeveloped during the late 1990s to a design by Foster and Partners, from a 1970s design by Colin St John Wilson. The court was opened by Queen Elizabeth II in 2000.

== Description ==
The court has a tessellated glass roof, engineered by Buro Happold and built by Waagner-Biro, covering the entire court, and surrounds the original circular British Museum Reading Room in the centre, now a museum. It is the largest covered square in Europe. The glass and steel roof is made up of 4,878 unique steel members connected at 1,566 unique nodes and 1,656 pairs of glass windowpanes making up 6,100 m^{2} of glazing; each of a unique shape because of the undulating nature of the roof.

Controversially, some of the stone in the court is from France, rather than being Portland stone from southern England as agreed in the original contract with the masons.

Within the Great Court, there are shops and a café. The court acts as a central linking point for the museum, somewhat like I. M. Pei's Louvre Pyramid in Paris.

== Construction ==
The central courtyard of the British Museum was occupied by the British Library until 1997, when it moved to St Pancras. At that time the entire courtyard was filled with bookshelves, three storeys high (the "book stacks"). To get from one side of the museum to the other, visitors had to go around.

Once the Library had moved out, the book stacks were cleared and the Great Court constructed in this central courtyard. A new 'ground' level was created, a story higher than the original courtyard, with the space below used to accommodate the Clore Education Centre and the African galleries (which had been housed at the Museum of Mankind since 1970).

The South Portico was largely rebuilt, with two new lifts incorporated for disabled access to the upper levels of the museum.

A new gridshell glass roof, designed and built by Austrian specialists Waagner-Biro, was provided over the entire courtyard to create a covered space at the centre of the museum.

The British Library Reading Room at the centre of the courtyard was retained and refurbished for use as the Museum library and information centre. The Reading Room had no outer wall; the book stacks came right up to the back of the Reading Room shelves. So a new outer wall was created to protect the Reading Room, to support the new roof and to conceal the ventilation ducts serving the spaces below.

North of the Reading Room there is a block with a museum shop at ground level, a gallery for temporary exhibitions above and a restaurant above that, just below the glass roof.

== Education facilities ==
The Clore Education Centre is housed in the lower level of the Great Court. It comprises the:

- BP Lecture Theatre
- Hugh and Catherine Stevenson Theatre
- Raymond and Beverly Sackler seminar room
- Studio, used for art and craft activities
- Claus Moser seminar room
- Ford Centre for Young Visitors
- Samsung Digital Discovery Centre

Nelson Mandela spoke at the inauguration of the BP Lecture Theatre on 16 November 2000. He supported the Museum's global role.

== Sculptures ==
Upon the Great Court's opening to the public in 2000, twelve sculptures from the British Museum's collection were installed on the main floor of the concourse:

- A stela of the Assyrian King Ashurnasirpal II (9th century BC)
- A marble Lion of Knidos, Asia Minor (3rd century BC)
- Two heads of Pharaoh Amenhotep III (c. 1400 BC)
- Two obelisks of the Egyptian King Nectanebo II (c. 350 BC)
- Hoa Hakananai'a, a statue from Easter Island (Date unknown, but between 1200 and 1800 AD), later moved to Room 24
- Two totem poles from British Columbia (19th century AD)
- A Roman equestrian statue (2nd century AD)
- An Irish memorial slab carved in Ogham script (5th century AD)
- An Anglo-Saxon cross shaft (late 8th/early 9th century AD)
- A pair of Chinese guardian figures (17th century AD)
- A column base from Persepolis (5th century BC)

There were initial plans for a new, thirteenth sculpture to be commissioned from Anish Kapoor, but the plans were scrapped. This sculpture is Cloud Column which was installed in Houston, Texas in 2018.

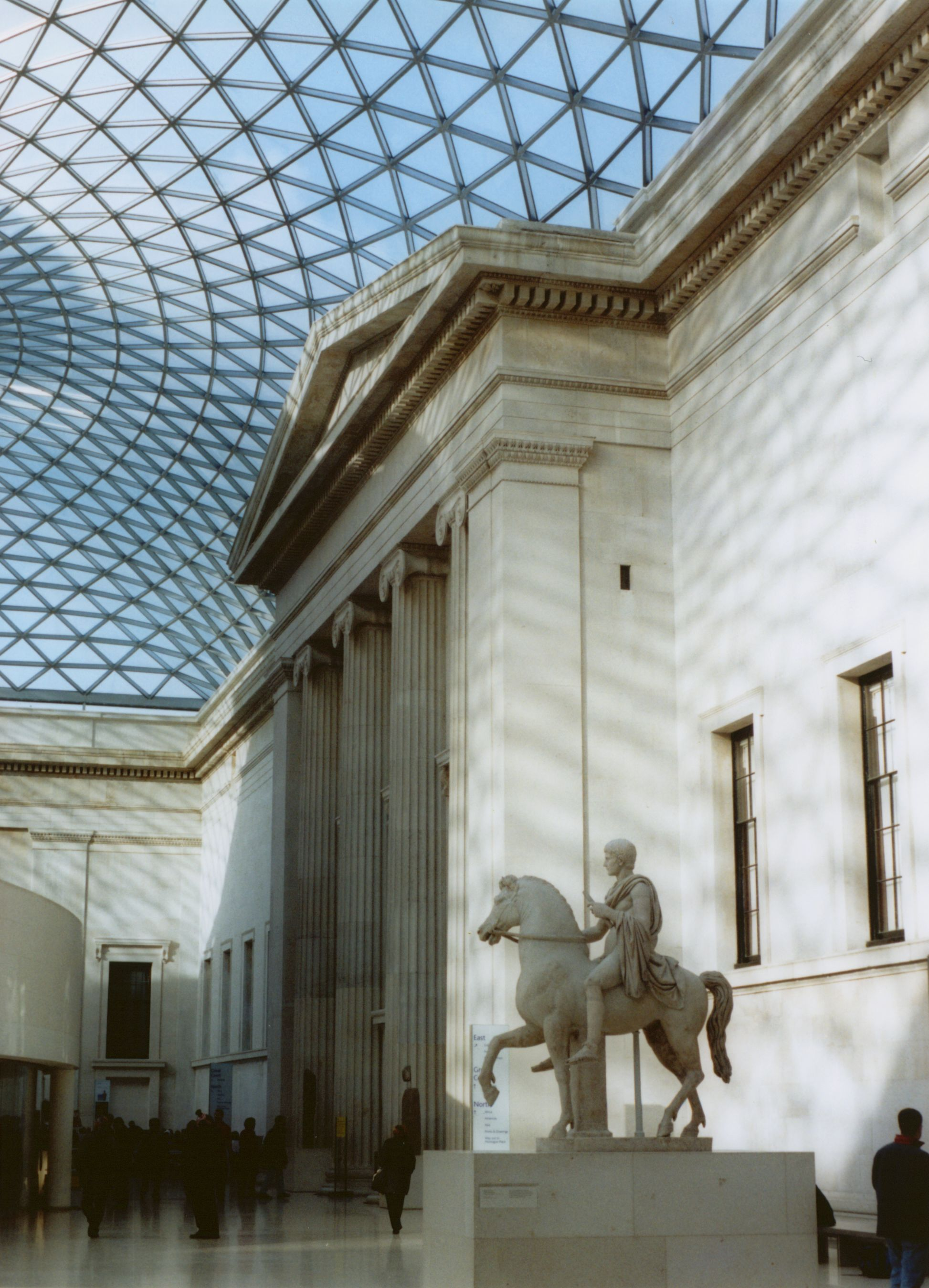
East Portico of Sir Robert Smirke's building; Roman equestrian statue visible in the foreground

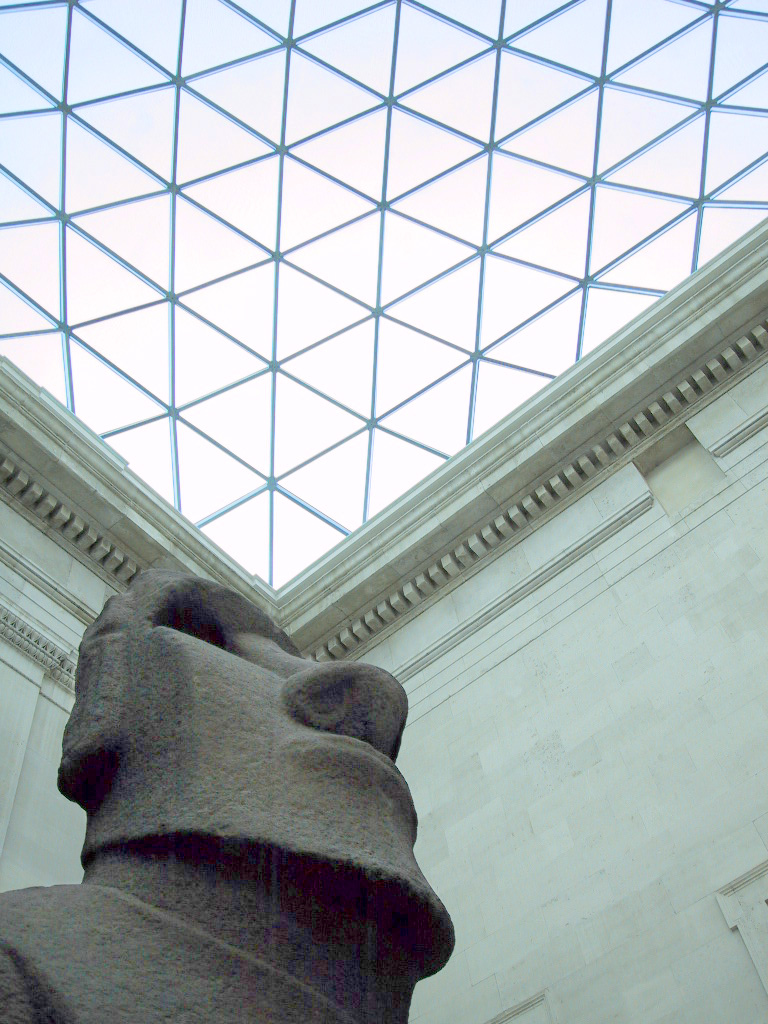
Hoa Hakananai'a

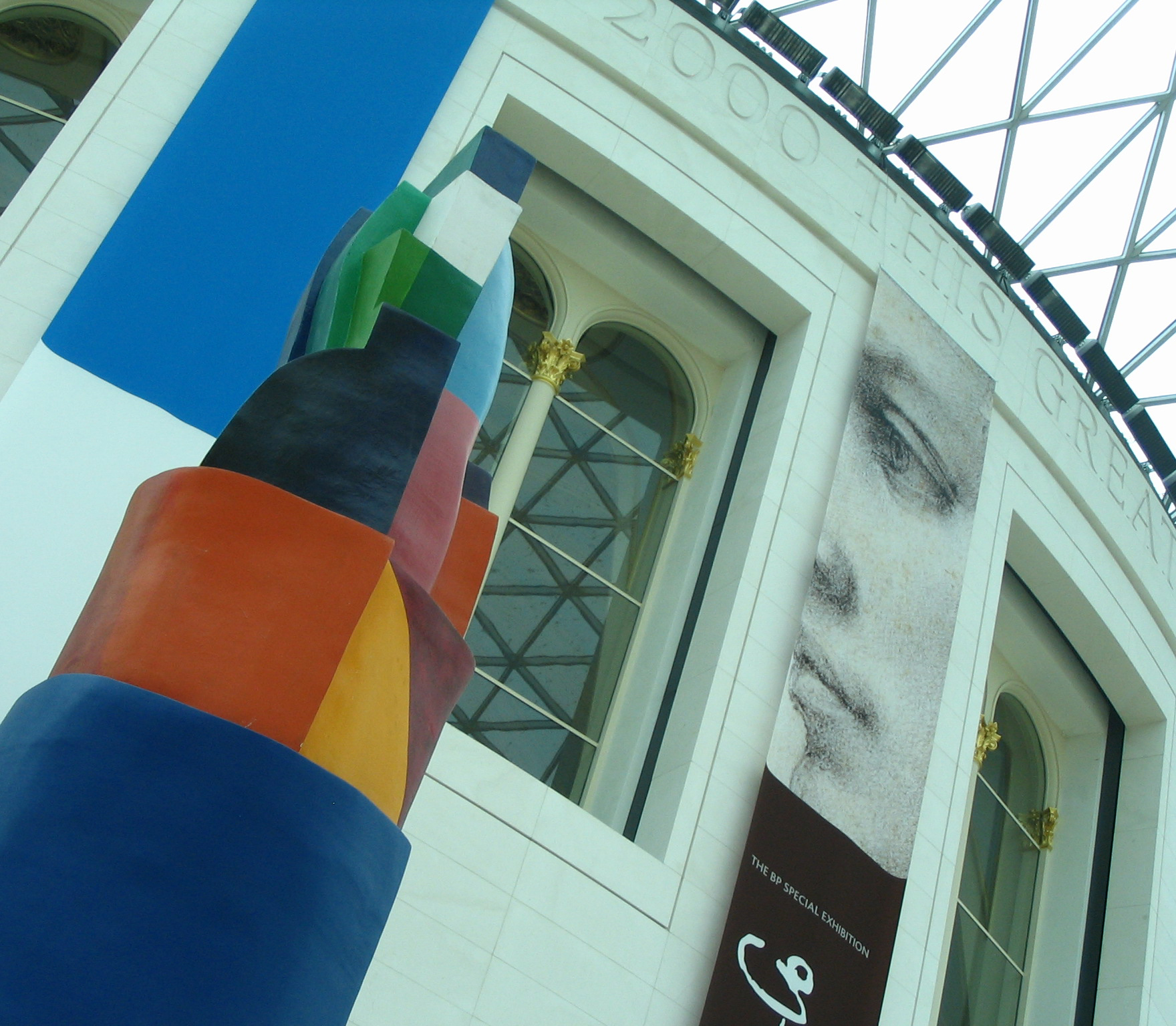
Sculpture in the court in 2006

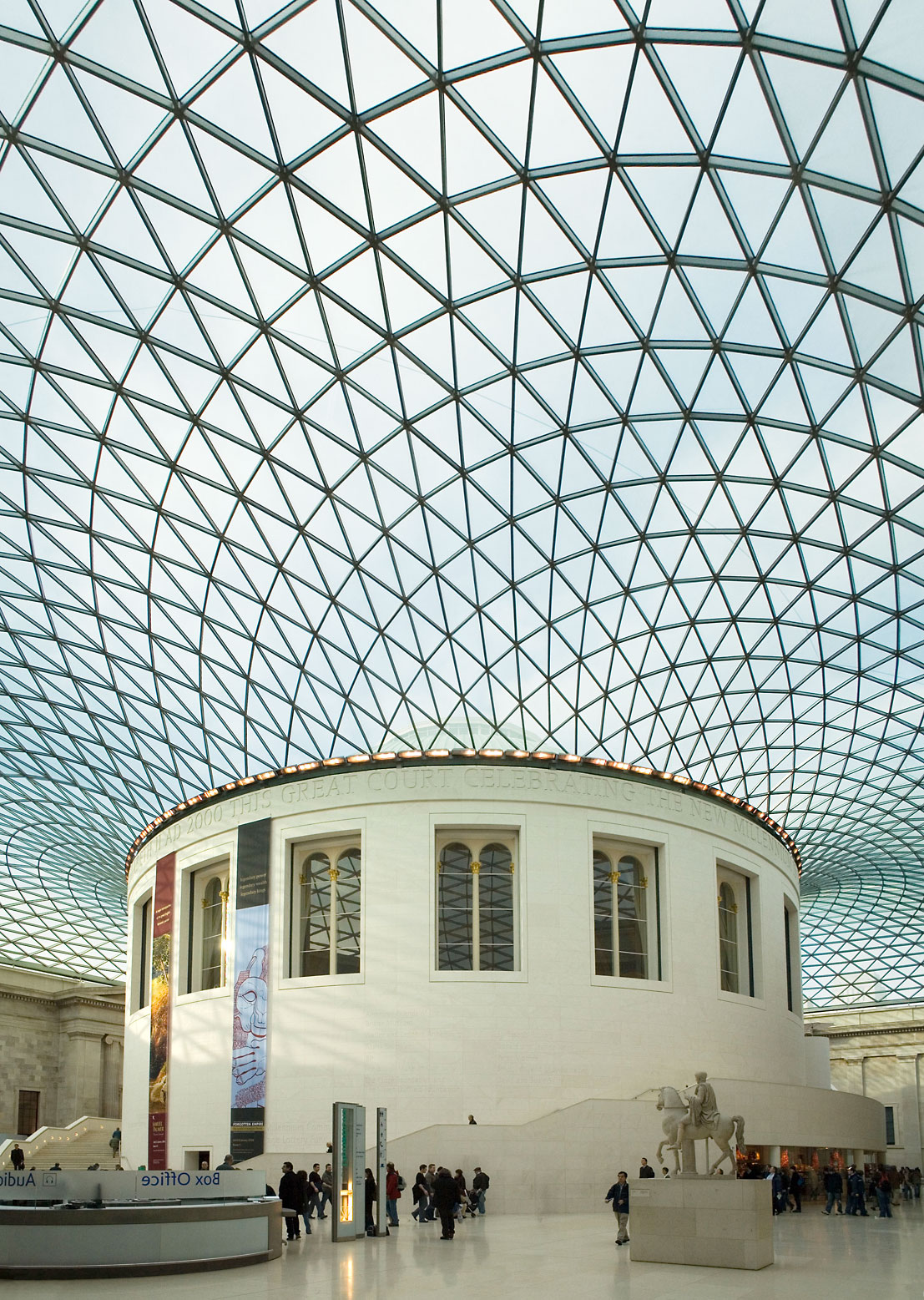
The Reading Room and Great Court roof as viewed from ground level

== See also ==
- Diagrid
- Thin-shell structure
- List of thin shell structures
