= Ribbon development =

Development along a single road

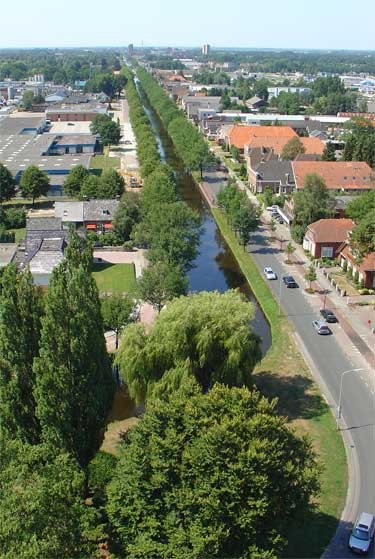
Ribbon development in Stadskanaal, Netherlands

Ribbon development refers to the pattern of houses or shops constructed along roads or railways radiating from a human settlement. The term may distinctly refer to either an open-air shopping centre along a street, or the phenomenon of urban sprawl suburban growth.

The growth pattern was met with opposition the 1920s and 1930s Britain due to the resulting reduction in road capacity. Normally the first ribbons are focused on roads. Following the Industrial Revolution, dotted or joined-up ribbon development emerged along railway lines, predominantly in Russia, the United Kingdom, and the United States. However, the investment required to build railway stations, the ensuing attractiveness of easy rail access, and need for accompanying roads often led to new small settlements outside of the center city. Such strips yielded attractive home locations on isolated roads as increasing motor car ownership meant that houses could be sold easily even if they were remote from workplaces and urban centres. Developers were pleased to not have to construct additional roads, thereby saving money and plot space. Ribbon developments specifically are between urban areas, appealing to new residents needing or wanting to access points in opposite directions linked in any way by their road or railway.

The extent of this development practice around roads led to several problems becoming more intense. Ribbon developments were ultimately recognized as an inefficient use of resources, economically meriting bypass roads to be added, and often served as a precursor to untrammelled urban sprawl. Thus a key aim for Britain's post-war planning system was a presumption in planning guidance, in its loosest terms becoming a convention based on its inherent economic and traffic arguments, that new ribbon development would not be permitted. Urban sprawl/suburbanization of large areas led to the introduction of green belt policies, new towns, planned suburbs and garden cities.

== Classification ==
Ribbon development is not restricted to construction along road or rail corridors, as it can also occur along ridge lines, canals and coastlines, the last of which occurs especially as people seeking seachange lifestyles build their houses for an optimal view.

Towns and cities serviced by ribbon development are often difficult to service efficiently due to their remoteness and lack of density. Often, the first problem noticed by residents is increased traffic congestion, as an increased number of people move along the narrow urban corridor while development continues at the lengthening end of the corridor.

The resulting linear settlements are clearly visible on land use maps and aerial photographs, giving cities and the countryside a particular character.

== History ==
Following the Industrial Revolution, ribbon development became prevalent along railway lines, predominantly in Russia, the United Kingdom, and the United States. The deliberate promotion of Metro-land along London's Metropolitan Railway serves as a strong example of this form of development. Similar examples can be found from Long Island (where Frederick W Dunton bought much real estate to encourage New Yorkers to settle along the Long Island Rail Road lines), Boston and across the American Midwest.

In 1935, the Restriction of Ribbon Development Bill of 1935 was passed in Britain. The bill was an ad hoc measure responding to public pressure.

== Examples ==
=== United Kingdom ===
National policy has been debated and applied against these narrow strips in the United Kingdom since the 1920s.

=== Republic of Ireland ===
Ribbon development is a more prevalent problem in parts of the Republic of Ireland than Britain, where "one-off houses" proliferate on rural roads. This causes difficulties in the efficient supply of water, sewerage, broadband, electricity, telephones and public transport. In 1998, Frank McDonald contrasted development in the Republic with that in Northern Ireland: "Enniskillen [in Northern Ireland] is well defined with clear boundaries to the town and well-laid-out shopping streets. Letterkenny, [in the Republic] by contrast, appears as just one long street with bungalow development trailing off over all the surrounding hills." The houses (ofter disparaged as "McMansions") are also criticised for spoiling countryside scenery: Monaghan County Council in 2013 declared that "The Council will resist development that would create or extend ribbon development." Tipperary County Council and many other councils have adopted similar policies.

=== Belgium ===
Recently, in places such as Flanders, Belgium, regional zoning policy has resulted in ribbon development patterns. Various spatial policies embedded in these plans help predict where ribbon developments may occur and at what rate.

== Criticisms ==
Criticism of ribbon development in the 20th century was often discussed in the context of traffic engineering, and improving the efficiency of highway operation.

While mixed streets - including shopping destinations and movement functionality - are sometimes seen as a place of potential, they are often viewed as an urban problem to be overcome. Mixed streets are sometimes seen in planning terms as abstract retail space, or in Traffic engineering terms as strategic traffic corridors. Thriving ribbon shopping centres on freeways are rare.

=== Increased congestion ===
Due to the main road being flanked by homes or commercial establishments, stoppages in traffic may frequently occur as a result of deliveries or vehicles entering or exiting driveways. This can pose danger for other vehicles that may not see entering traffic, especially if the road is bordered by garages. Residents may also choose to walk alongside the road, an activity made more dangerous by fast-moving traffic.

=== Utility access ===
For as simple as linear construction emanating from a city is, the length of a ribbon corridor can pose financial concerns for utility companies as they serve buildings. Density is preferable for utility grids, thereby risking poor access for far-away buildings.

=== Disruptions during construction ===
Construction of a new home or building within a ribbon development may severely disrupt the flow of vehicles along the road because there are no feeder streets for construction vehicles to station on. Traffic may be forced into a single lane or subjected to an alternating pattern.

=== Obstruction of countryside ===
Because most ribbon developments exist in rural areas outside of cities, properties can disturb or obstruct the natural landscapes along the road may be constructed along an overlook, removing the public's ability to enjoy the landscape in favor of a single property owner.

=== Municipal boundaries ===
Elongated ribbon developments also pose challenges for municipal governments as they partition out rural areas for townships and schools. Rather than development in small towns where schools and other public amenities reside, certain locations within a ribbon development may be difficult to serve by a government and, in turn, cost more in public expenditures.

== See also ==
- Green belt
- Linear village
- One-off housing
- Towards an Urban Renaissance
- Urban Sprawl
