= Ruth Rogers =

American and British chef (born 1948)

The Right Honourable The Lady Rogers of Riverside CBE
- Born: Ruth Elias; 2 July 1948 (age 77); New York, US
- Citizenship: US; UK
- Spouse(s): Richard Rogers, Baron Rogers of Riverside (m. 1973; died 2021)
- Culinary career
- Cooking style: British and Italian cuisine
- Current restaurant: The River Café
- Website: rivercafe.co.uk

Ruth Rogers, Baroness Rogers of Riverside, CBE (née Elias; born 2 July 1948) is an American and British chef who owns and runs the Michelin starred Italian restaurant The River Café in Hammersmith, London. She is the widow of the Italian-born British architect Richard Rogers, Baron Rogers of Riverside.

== Early and private life ==
Ruth Elias was born in upstate New York. She inherited her left-wing politics from her parents. Her father was a doctor, the son of immigrants to the US from Hungary; he spent some time in Spain in the 1930s during the Spanish Civil War. Her mother was a librarian and trade union activist, whose parents came to the US from Russia. Her brother is screenwriter Michael Elias, who co-wrote the movie The Jerk and co-created the TV sitcom Head of the Class. The family moved to Woodstock in the early 1960s; she recounts an anecdote of turning down an invitation to watch Bob Dylan and his band rehearsing in 1965. She is Jewish.

She studied at Colorado Rocky Mountain School from 1964 to 1966, and then for a year at Bennington College in Vermont. In 1967, her second (sophomore) year, she took a year out to come to England, accompanying a boyfriend who was a Rhodes scholar in Oxford. After she decided against returning to Bennington, she studied design at the London College of Printing from 1968. While in London, she joined the protests against the Vietnam War outside the US Embassy in Grosvenor Square in 1968.

She met the architect Richard Rogers in late 1969. Rogers was 15 years older, and at the time he was married to and in a professional partnership (Team 4) with his first wife Su Rogers (née Brumwell), with three young sons. After Rogers divorced his first wife, he married Ruth in 1973. She accompanied Rogers when he moved to Paris for several years to supervise the building of the Pompidou Centre. They lived above a market in Le Marais, where she learnt the importance of seasonality, before moving to the Place des Vosges. She then spent time in north Italy; Rogers's parents had moved to England from Florence.

She lived with her husband in two town houses in Chelsea, converted to a single dwelling by her husband in 1983. They had two sons, Roo (born 1975) and Bo (born 1983). Their younger son Bo died suddenly in October 2011, aged 27.

== The River Café ==
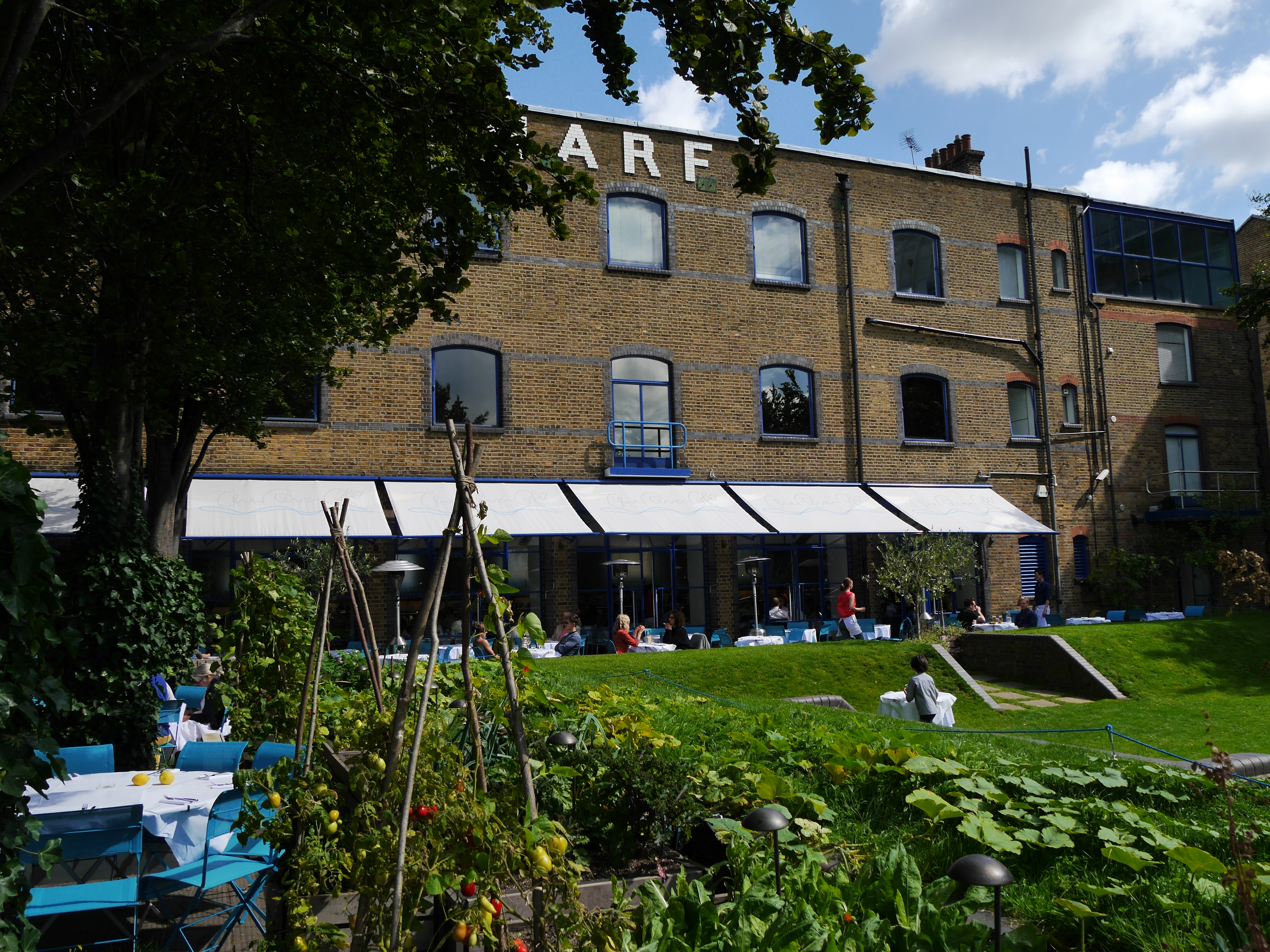
The River Café in London

After her experiences in France and Italy, Rogers was inspired to open an Italian restaurant in London in 1987 with Rose Gray, initially almost as a canteen to feed the staff at Rogers's architecture practice based nearby at Thames Wharf, Hammersmith. Her husband designed the minimalist space. The River Café developed a strong reputation for the seasonality and quality of its food, and its intense focus on authentic Italian cooking. Its cookbooks, such as The River Café Cook Book (first published in 1995), have become best-sellers, and Gray and Rogers presented The Italian Kitchen on Channel 4 in 1998. The restaurant has trained a series of successful chefs, including April Bloomfield, Hugh Fearnley-Whittingstall, Jamie Oliver, and Theo Randall, and it has held a Michelin star since 1998. Rogers has continued to run the restaurant after the death of her business partner Rose Gray from cancer in 2010.

Among her culinary influences are Julia Child and her book Mastering the Art of French Cooking, and Marcella Hazan and her book The Classic Italian Cook Book.

Rogers was appointed Member of the Order of the British Empire (MBE) in the 2010 New Year Honours and Commander of the Order of the British Empire (CBE) in the 2020 Birthday Honours for services to the culinary arts and charity.

=== Podcast ===
Rogers runs the podcast Ruthie's Table 4, originally called River Café Table 4, an interview series in which she speaks to patrons of her restaurant about their lives and food memories. Guests have included John Lithgow, Francis Ford Coppola, Ian McKellan, Nancy Pelosi, Tony Blair, Judi Dench, Emily Blunt, Mel Brooks, Sarah Jessica Parker, and numerous others.
