= Compact city =

High density mixed use transit oriented planning

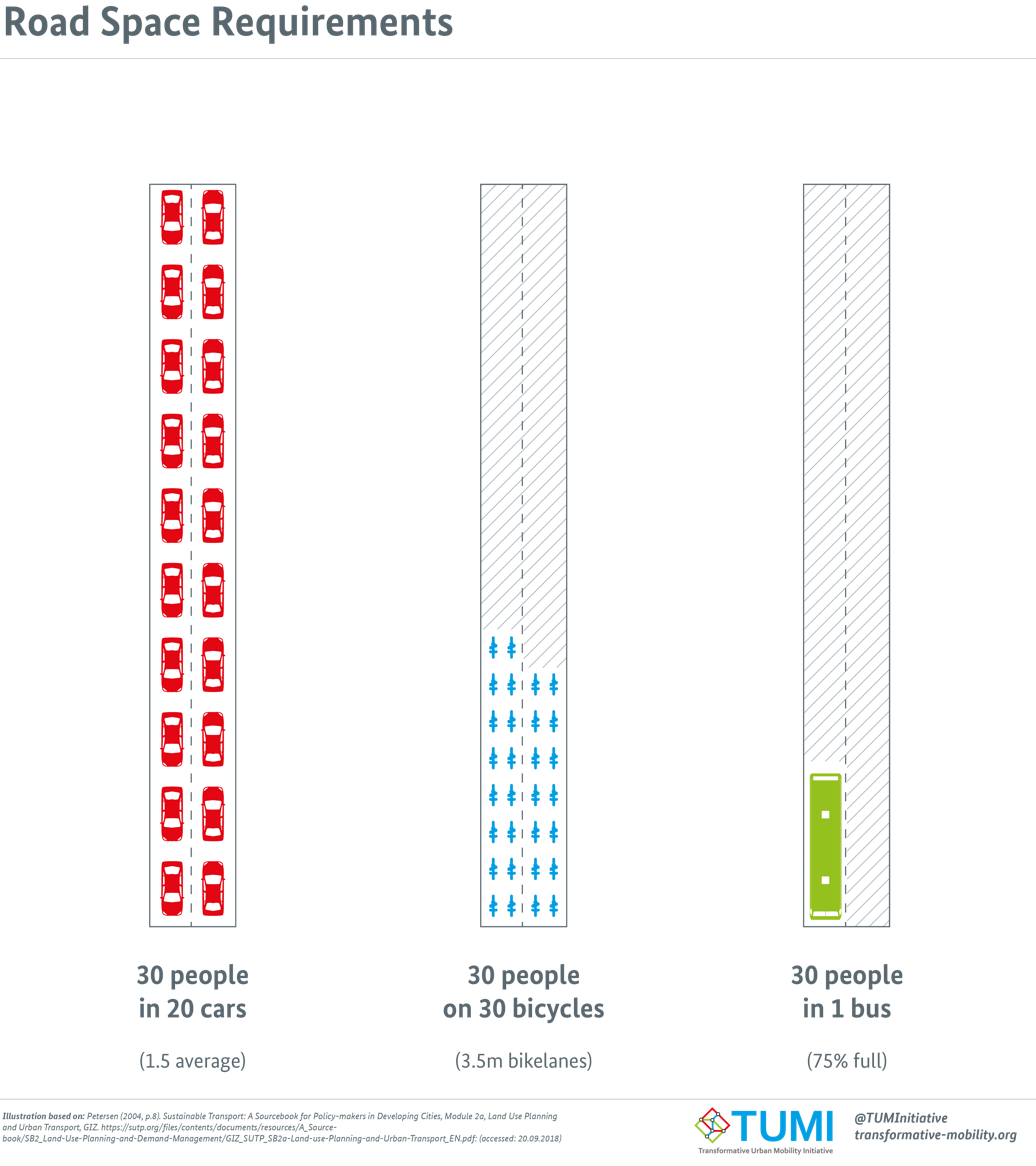
Road Space Requirements

The compact city or city of short distances is an urban planning and urban design concept, which promotes relatively high residential density with mixed land uses. It is based on an efficient public transport system and has an urban layout which – according to its advocates – encourages walking and cycling, low energy consumption and reduced pollution. A large resident population provides opportunities for social interaction as well as a feeling of safety in numbers and "eyes on the street". It is also arguably a more sustainable urban settlement type than urban sprawl because it is less dependent on the car, requiring less (and cheaper per capita) infrastructure provision (Williams 2000, cited in Dempsey 2010).

Achieving a compact city does not just mean increasing urban density per se or across all parts of the city. It means good planning to achieve an overall more compact urban form:

Governments of sprawling cities can take many actions to seek a more compact form, often also involving higher densities. Other cities, such as Cairo, with large, dense slum areas, are responding by reducing urban densities in core areas. In either case, limiting outward urban expansion can be combined with more efficient use of land resources and more effective protection of natural resources. City growth can be physically limited in this way through legislated urban growth boundaries, non-urban green belts, and the quarantining of development in certain areas.

The compact city model, ideally, creates benefits that are attractive to modern urbanites. The desired benefits include shorter commute times, reduced environmental impact of the community, and reduced consumption of fossil fuels and energy. However, research on compact cities from around the globe suggests that these outcomes are not guaranteed. To make matters worse, the design of the cities is limiting residents' access to green space and reasonable views. For the compact city model to gain in popularity, it is necessary to review both their pros and cons.

== Origins ==
The term compact city was first coined in 1973 by George Dantzig and Thomas L. Saaty, two mathematicians whose utopian vision was largely driven by a desire to see more efficient use of resources. The concept, as it has influenced urban planning, is often attributed to Jane Jacobs and her book The Death and Life of Great American Cities (1961), a critique of modernist planning policies claimed by Jacobs to be destroying many existing inner-city communities.

Among other criticisms of the conventional planning and transport planning of the time, Jacobs' work attacked the tendency, inherited from the garden city movement, towards reducing the density of dwellings in urban areas. Four conditions were necessary to enable the diversity essential for urban renewal: mixed uses, small walkable blocks, mingling of building ages and types, and "a sufficiently dense concentration of people". The 'sufficient' density would vary according to local circumstances but, in general, a hundred dwellings per acre (247 per hectare – high by American standards, but quite common in European and Asian cities) could be considered a minimum.

== Important terms ==
To understand a discussion about compact cities several key terms need to be defined. The first term is urban density. Urban density refers to how many people live in a square mile of land. It is used as a variable in evaluating how livable a city design is. The optimal urban density for compact cities is high enough to keep residents close to community amenities but low enough to allow residents access to green spaces, reasonable privacy, and acceptable views.

Another term associated with the discussion about the compact city commuter is self-sustaining. Self-sustaining means that the city has everything that a person needs within the community. This includes stores, employers, a post office, service providers, energy generation, waste disposal and processing, and small-scale agricultural production (community gardens and/or vertical gardening).

Since the objective of the compact city is to make the community as accessible as possible to residents, the term pedestrian design also needs to be defined. Pedestrian design means that the compact city's layout and features support pedestrian traffic. This is an important part of a compact city design because it facilitates the flow of foot and bike traffic through the community. While a pedestrian design will primarily focus on hardscape elements, such as pathways and sidewalks, green space also is important to consider.

Green space, defined as the areas of nature found in the landscaping of a community, includes grassy patches, flowerbeds, trees, rock gardens, and water features. Green space is important in compact city designs because they enhance the aesthetics of the community. It also helps to control storm runoff, and they help to remove CO_{2} and other toxins from the air.

Proximity is the final term that needs to be defined. It refers to how close a community's amenities are to where people live. Ideally, compact cities will keep key amenities within walking distance of people's homes. The acceptability of proximity to different amenities is calculated based on travel time and distance.

== The compact city and related concepts ==
Although the concept of 'compact city' was coined by American writers, it has been used more in recent years by European and particularly British planners and academics. See, for example, the writings of Michael Jenks.

In North America the term 'smart growth' has become increasingly common linked to the concept of 'smart city'. The concept of 'smart growth' is very similar to 'compact city', although 'smart growth' carries more strongly normative connotations, implicitly accepting the emphasis in current mainstream debates that growth is necessary and good. The term is often used loosely to accommodate these debates

Cognate concepts include 'sustainable urban development' with no presumption that development equals growth.

Another alternative concept is 'green urbanism'. Steffen Lehmann has extensively written about the compact city and green urbanism. His work presents a series of international case studies and outlines 15 core principles for the design of compact, sustainable cities.

== The compact city and proximity ==
Compact cities are intended to provide all one needs to live in one community, including work opportunities. Someone who works in a compact city can walk or bike a short distance to work instead of driving. This reduces fossil fuel consumption and emissions and pollutants, as well as traffic density. This is a main selling point of a compact city. However, not everyone finds work in the city, and consequently many people commute to neighboring cities for work. This has two drawbacks: commuting time and the impact of commuting.

A study by Boussauw et al. found that commute times depend on urban density and the diversity of structures found in the community. The findings show that shorter commutes correlate with high values for density, diversity, and job accessibility. Thus proximity to work within a compact city needs the city to include structures that are appropriate for businesses in different industries; it also depends on the city's density of development. The more developed the city is, therefore, the more employers can be located there, and the fewer employees will need to commute long distances.

Proximity also affects residents' access to green spaces. This is related because the more green space a community has the lower the development's urban density, thus increasing average commuting distance. In a study by Wolsink, participants viewed community proximity to green spaces as important, because green spaces provided recreational and educational opportunities, enhanced mental health, made the city more attractive. These benefits made additional time in commutes acceptable to residents. However, to remain acceptable, the proximity range needed to remain reasonable.

== Compact cities and sustainability ==
Another selling point of compact cities is that they are supposed to be sustainable developments. However, recent studies suggest that these developments are not as green as promised. For example, in the study by Rérat, the author discussed three criticisms of the compact city model. The first criticism was that supply and demand alignments are not feasible in some cases. What this means is that there are limits to how many people can fit into a space because of resource and design limitations. Additionally, while a high-density may be achievable, it likely will counter the demands and expectations of residents who want more privacy and more personal space. The second criticism of the compact city is that to produce highly desirable living conditions and a high quality of life, the cost of living needs to increase. Consequently, integrating desirable traits into compact cities makes the living spaces expensive, pricing out lower-income families and pushing them to the outskirts of town. This stimulates urban sprawl and places the burden of longer commutes on low-income workers, further expanding disparities in wealth and quality of life. The third criticism of the compact city is that its environmental impacts are significant. Dense populations mean waste and pollution are also dense. This concentrates the impact of communities and necessitates expensive control mechanism.

Rérat is not the only researcher showing evidence that compact cities are not as sustainable as promised. The work by Westernick et al. also show that there are sustainability trade-offs found within compact city designs. Westernick et al. compared compact cities to dispersed cities to see where sustainability factors differed. The findings showed that compact cities excelled in efficient land consumption, more flexible land use patterns, cost efficiency of development and maintenance, and reduced reliance on fossil fuels and motor vehicles. In contrast, however, the sustainability disadvantages included higher vulnerability to disaster impacts, less personal space, less green space where people live, and higher environmental impact because of density. These drawbacks make compact cities less sustainable and justify the need for design improvements.

== The compact city, urban sprawl and automobile dependency ==
Whether the compact city (or 'smart growth') does or can reduce problems of automobile dependency associated with urban sprawl has been fiercely contested over several decades. An influential study in 1989 by Peter Newman and Jeff Kenworthy compared 32 cities across North America, Australia, Europe and Asia. The study's methodology has been criticised but the main finding that denser cities, particularly in Asia, have lower car use than sprawling cities, particularly in North America, has been largely accepted – although the relationship is clearer at the extremes across continents than it is within countries where conditions are more similar.

Within cities, studies from across many countries (mainly in the developed world) have shown that denser urban areas with greater mixture of land use and better public transport tend to have lower car use than less dense suburban and exurban residential areas. This usually holds true even after controlling for socio-economic factors such as differences in household composition and income. This does not necessarily imply that suburban sprawl causes high car use, however. One confounding factor, which has been the subject of many studies, is residential self-selection: people who prefer to drive tend to move towards low density suburbs, whereas people who prefer to walk, cycle or use transit tend to move towards higher density urban areas, better served by public transport. Some studies have found that, when self-selection is controlled for, the built environment has no significant effect on travel behaviour. More recent studies using more sophisticated methodologies have generally refuted these findings: density, land use and public transport accessibility can influence travel behaviour, although social and economic factors, particularly household income, usually exert a stronger influence.

== The paradox of intensification ==
Reviewing the evidence on urban intensification, smart growth and their effects on travel behaviour, Melia et al. (2011) found support for the arguments of both supporters and opponents of the compact city. Planning policies which increase population densities in urban areas do tend to reduce car use, but the effect is a weak one, so doubling the population density of a particular area will not halve the frequency or distance of car use.

For example, Portland, Oregon, a U.S. city which has pursued smart growth policies, substantially increased its population density between 1990 and 2000 when other US cities of a similar size were reducing in density. As predicted by the paradox, traffic volumes and congestion both increased more rapidly than in the other cities, despite a substantial increase in transit use.

These findings led them to propose the paradox of intensification, which states:

Ceteris paribus, urban intensification which increases population density will reduce per capita car use, with benefits to the global environment, but will also increase concentrations of motor traffic, worsening the local environment in those locations where it occurs.

At the citywide level it may be possible, through a range of positive measures, to counteract the increases in traffic and congestion which would otherwise result from increasing population densities: Freiburg im Breisgau in Germany is one example of a city which has been more successful in this respect.

This study also reviewed evidence on the local effects of building at higher densities. At the level of the neighbourhood or individual development, positive measures (e.g. improvements to public transport) will usually be insufficient to counteract the traffic effect of increasing population density. This leaves policy-makers with four choices: intensify and accept the local consequences, sprawl and accept the wider consequences, a compromise with some element of both, or intensify accompanied by more radical measures such as parking restrictions, closing roads to traffic and carfree zones.

Building on self-reports of a sample of 336 residents who have often experienced a shift from low to high density living in Tehran, Ziafati Bafarasat (2017) tests a hypothesis suggesting that, in the context of attempts to escape and restore from chronic noise, contact load, and the sense of encapsulation, a compact city might increase discretionary car travel. Findings support the hypothesis as these density stressors increased the car travel time of 30–48% of respondents by at least 7–24% for escape and restoration. This appears to offset the trip-reduction benefit of higher density living. If a 5% reduction is assumed in car travel distance in the sample districts in the context of density, and, under the optimistic scenario, that the time-distance ratio is 1 in high density areas, this finding feeds into the conclusion that high density might have had no positive effect on, or even increased to a limited degree, the overall time of car travel.

== Case studies ==
Around the globe, countries experiment with compact city models. To understand the outcomes of these model cities, the following discussion explores two case studies. The first case study comes from Australia and the second comes from Belgium.

The Australian case of compact cities derives from a study by Bunker. It provides a commentary on urban development strategies used in Australia. To begin with, Australia has very low population density because of its extensive availability of space and its relatively low population. However, beginning in 2000, Australia adopted the compact city model for all its urban planning. Planners adopted this development philosophy because projections showed that the growth in Australia's largest cities was expected to be high over the next decade. In adopting the compact city model, Australian planners set their development objectives to limit urban sprawl; to promote infill, renewal, and redevelopment; to increase dwelling type diversity; to diversify economic activity in communities; to motivate development to remain close to the economic diversity; to encourage residents to use public transportation; and to inspire residents to walk or cycle instead of driving cars (13). Since 2000, Australia's growth patterns have followed these objectives with positive outcomes. Not only are fossil fuel reduction objectives being met, but compact community members are adopting more active lifestyles, enhancing public health. This suggests that by planning to make urban communities self-sustaining, compact city planners can meet their objectives.

The Belgium case came from an article by Boussauw et al. This article compared two different development models used in Belgium. The models were the New Urbanism model and the Compact City model. Both models promote dense populations with lots of open green spaces and proximity to shopping and work options. The findings showed that the closer the proximity is within a community, the more likely people are to walk or cycle instead of driving. This shows that compact city models can produce environmental and public health benefits if proximity is optimized and if planners integrate pedestrian designs into the compact city layout. However, what the study did not address were the other factors that impact the environment's health, such as waste production and management, pollution density, and human impact on the environment.

== Improvements to be made ==
The compact city model has been shown to be a good model, but everything can use improvement. Some ideas for possible improvements include vertical green spaces, living walls and roofs, and the development of sustainable systems. To understand why these suggestions are a good idea, the following descriptions provide a quick overview of each.

Vertical gardens are planting installations placed on the exterior walls of buildings. This innovation is highly cost-effective and offers multiple benefits to community members. For example, these installations not only add greenery to urban landscapes, but they also provide insulation to the building, can act as natural air conditioners, and remove CO_{2} from the air.

Living roofs are like vertical gardens in that they are greenscapes added to the exterior of a building. However, where they differ is that living roofs utilize the horizontal space on the roof for gardens. These rooftop gardens provide insulation on the roof, help to manage runoff, and help to scrub CO_{2} from the air. An added benefit of this innovation is that it can produce healthy food for the building's residents.

Another innovation compact cities need to adopt are sustainable systems. Sustainable systems create the infrastructure to naturally process sewage waste, grey water, and storm runoff on-site. These systems channel the waste products through a filtration system that not only prevents flooding on the community's hardscape, but that also utilizes wastewater to fertilize and water gardens. As the plants filter the waste water, they remove solid particles, cleaning it before it joins ground or surface water.

== Influence in Europe ==
The European Commission published the Green Paper Towards a new culture for urban mobility on 27 September 2007. Several institutions reacted to the Green Paper among them the European Parliament.

Based on the preparatory work of its Committee on Transport and Tourism, the European Parliament in its Resolution of 9 July 2008 called among other things for "drawing up customised sustainable mobility plans and supporting measures for regional and urban planning ('city of short distances'), a process in which all parties concerned should be involved from an early stage". They referred among others to the EU strategy to combat climate change and other environmental problems.

=== Influence in the Netherlands ===
The Netherlands' urban planning is highly influenced by the 'compacte stad'. In the 1960s cities expanded in large, top-down planned neighbourhoods using the scarce space available to use as efficiently as possible. Later, cities were not allowed to expand anyhow, giving way for completely new towns on moderate distances from the main city, in order to keep the new towns influenced mainly by their 'capital', however, giving the towns also some own air. Public transport between the main city and its towns in the rural areas connected them. This policy (groeikernenbeleid) resulted in typical commuter towns. Afterwards, in the 1980s, governments decided people need and want to live in this capital city itself and the groeikernenbeleid was rejected. New urban neighbourhoods had to be around a city, as a skin, encircling skins of older neighbourhoods. The new neighbourhoods were cleverly designed, relatively dense and with very good connections to get downtown by public transport or bicycle.

This history results in a lack of urban sprawl, or at least of new urban sprawl. As new neighbourhoods need to be built as an outer skin around existing settlements and as other policies prohibited establishing new settlements outside other towns or villages, no new linear villages could be founded without governmental intervention any more. This in order to keep the rural landscape 'clean' and cities dense and compact.

As a result, all neighbourhoods in Dutch towns are close to city centres, enabling inhabitants to get around quickly and cheaply by bike. Getting out of town doesn't involve driving through ever-ongoing sprawled suburbs, making it easy and popular to visit rural areas. By all these regulations, for instance the Groene Hart (Green Heart amid the Randstad) is kept green, while buffers around cities like Amsterdam, Utrecht and Delft avoids getting the cities grown together entirely.

=== Influence in the United Kingdom ===
The compact city had a particularly strong influence on planning policy in the UK during the Labour Governments of 1997–2010. The first Labour Government in 1998 set up the Urban Taskforce under Lord Rogers of Riverside, which produced the report Towards an Urban Renaissance. Influenced by this report, the UK Government issued PPG 3 Planning Policy Guidance on Housing which introduced a 60% brownfield target, a minimum net residential density guideline of 30 dwellings per hectare, a sequential hierarchy beginning with urban brownfield land, maximum parking guidelines replacing the previous minima, and a policy of intensification around public transport nodes. Over the succeeding years, these targets were substantially exceeded, with the brownfield proportion reaching 80% by 2009, and average densities 43 dwellings per hectare.

== In Russia and other ex-Soviet countries ==
Most cities in Russia such as regional capitals Yaroslavl, Krasnodar, Novosibirsk, etc., as well as cities and towns in other ex Eastern Bloc countries, such as Trenčín or Zvolen in Slovakia, can be qualified as compact cities, where most people live in residential areas made up of big apartment blocks of between 3 and 8 floors, in parks full of trees, flowers, playgrounds, benches, etc. with small shops and cafés on the ground level or in clusters around the main paths. Residents therefore have much space to socialize. Cars typically have only limited access to the "inner garden " that surrounds the apartment blocks and are limited to the main boulevards. The high population density means people have to walk shorter distances to get to the supermarket, school, kindergarten, pub, restaurant, grocery, library, gym, or access the public transportation system – a mix of public buses and tramway and private minibuses. Most people in those cities do not own a car and if they do, they use it only in the summer to drive to their dacha. Living in apartments also means fewer losses of energy spent on heating, each apartment block having one central heating system in the basement that can be either publicly or privately run.

== Conclusion ==
Compact cities are designed to keep residents in close proximity to everything they need for daily living, including shopping, education, housing, and work. The rationale of this urban development model is to reduce the amount of time people spend commuting, as well as to reduce fossil fuel usage and to increase the sustainability of developments. While compact cities promise short commutes and sustainable designs, these benefits are not guaranteed. The problems preventing the desired outcomes include failure to consider the concentrated impact of dense populations on the environment and lack of planning for green space and pollution control. If planning addresses these issues and innovates to solve problems, everything promised by compact cities can be delivered.

== See also ==
- 15-minute city
- Circles of Sustainability
- Community Preservation Act
- Fused grid
- Healthy city
- Land value tax
- New Urbanism
- Planned community
- Principles of Intelligent Urbanism
- Slow architecture
- Traditional Neighborhood Development
- Transit-oriented development
- Urban density
- Urban sprawl
- Ville Radieuse
