= Rose Gray (chef) =

English chef and cookery writer (1939–2010)

Rose Gray MBE
- Born: Clemency Anne Rosemary Swann; January 28, 1939
- Died: February 28, 2010 (aged 71)
- Known for: Michelin starred Chef and cookery writer who spotted and nurtured many notable chefs.
- Spouses: Michael Selby Gray (m. 1962; div. 1971); David Robin MacIlwaine (m. 2004–2010)
- Children: 4

Clemency Anne Rosemary Gray MBE (née Swann; 28 January 1939 – 28 February 2010) was a British chef and cookery writer. With Ruth Rogers, she set up The River Café in 1987, which won a Michelin star in 1998.

It was here that the talents of Jamie Oliver were first spotted. She had a profound influence on a generation of celebrity chefs including Oliver, Theo Randall, April Bloomfield and Hugh Fearnley-Whittingstall, the latter stating that she had had more influence on him than any other person he had worked with. She wrote a series of cookery books and presented a twelve-part television programme for Channel Four, The Italian Kitchen, in 1998.

Rose Gray and Ruth Rogers at the restaurant they co-founded, The River Cafe.

== Early life ==
She was born in Bedford. Six months before her birth, her father, Flight Lieutenant Clement Nelson Swann, age 26, and a seven-month-old sister were killed in a domestic fire. She was brought up in Scotland and Surrey. Her mother, (Elizabeth) Anne Lawrence, daughter of Sir William Lawrence, 3rd Baronet, settled near Guildford, Surrey, and Rose studied at the Guildford College of Art, where she gained a BA in Fine Art. Her career as a professional chef began at Nell's restaurant in New York City, after which time she returned to London.

== Last years ==
She was diagnosed with breast cancer in 2001. In 2004 she became a "Breast Cancer Ambassador" and was also co-founder of the Cooks in Schools charity. She was in remission from breast cancer for five years before it returned and metastasised to her brain in late 2009 or early 2010. She died at home in Marylebone, London, aged 71, on 28 February 2010. She had been working on what was to be her last book (with Ruth Rogers), the River Café Classic Italian Cookery Book. Her other works (many of which were co-authored with Ruth Rogers) include the River Café Cookbook, the River Café Cookbook Green and River Café Pocket Books: Salads and Vegetables.

== Personal life ==
Rose Gray and her son Ossie

In 1961 or 1962, she married Michael Selby Gray. They had a son, Ossian, and two daughters, Hester and Lucy; the marriage ended in divorce. She had a son, Dante MacIlwaine Gray (born 1973), by her partner David Robin MacIlwaine, to whom she was married from 2004 until her death. They lived part of their life in Tuscany, where Rose first developed her interest in Italian food.

== See also ==
- Grice, Elizabeth (2 March 2010). "Rose Gray: formidable, funny and irrepressible". The Daily Telegraph.
- Rogers, Ben (2 March 2010). "Rose Gray, my other mother and a great cook". The Times. Archived from the original on 4 June 2011.
