= Zip-Up House =

House designed by Richard and Su Rogers

The Zip-Up House (formally Zip Up Enclosures No. 1 and 2) was designed between 1967 and 1969 by Richard Rogers and his then wife, Su Rogers (née Brumwell), for The House of Today competition, which was sponsored by DuPont. The house was never built, although the concept was later used for Richard Rogers' parents (Dr. Nino and Dada Rogers) house at 22 Parkside in Wimbledon, London.

== Concept ==
The Zip-Up House was designed between 1967 and 1969 for The House of Today competition, which was sponsored by DuPont and was exhibited at the 1969 Ideal Home Exhibition in London.

The design was for a factory-built house, quick to assemble (and re-assemble) with cheap insulation panels that are used on refrigeration trucks with rapid construction all at low cost.

Richard Rogers wrote:

Buying clothes off the rack is the norm. We wanted to do the same for the house – an affordable, speedy kit of parts.

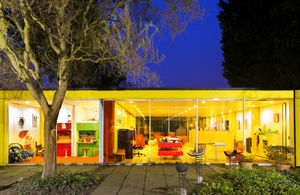
22 Parkside

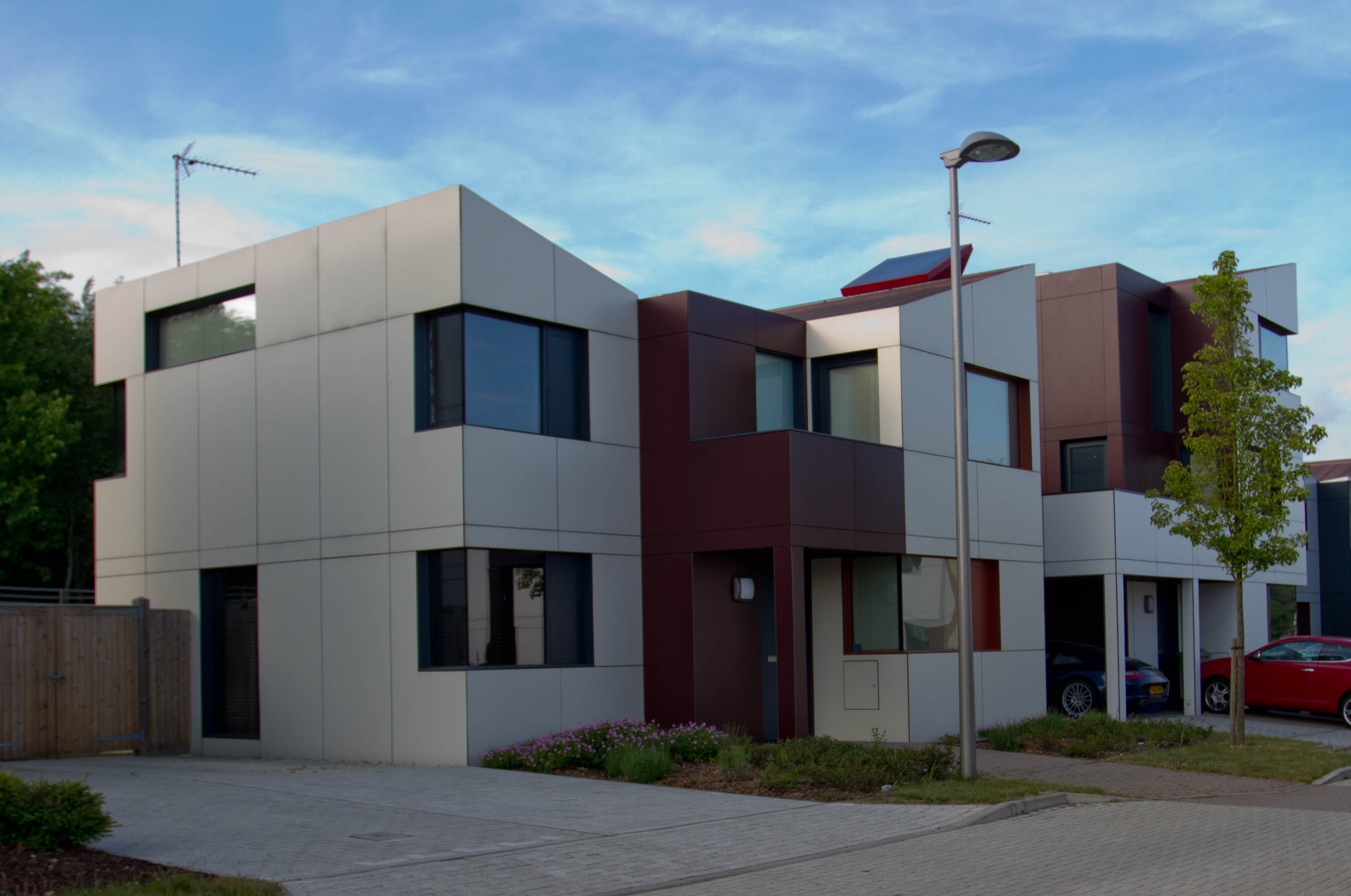
Oxley Woods

The design project never went into production, although the concept was used on his parents’ house (22 Parkside, Wimbledon), and later with the Oxley Woods housing development in Milton Keynes. It was designed to offer a wide range choice of configurations all at a low building cost, with minimum maintenance and running costs so that one 3 kilowatt heater would be sufficient to heat the whole building. The interior of the building could be changed very quickly or the house extended by just adding another section to the house. Adjustable legs were used so that the building could located anywhere and easily moved to a new site, instead of using sold foundations. The concept could also be used for factories, offices or hotels.

== See also ==
- Rogers Stirk Harbour + Partners
- Team 4
