= Roo Rogers =

British-American entrepreneur, business designer and author (born 1975)

- Born: January 1975 (age 51)
- Education: Columbia University (BA); University College London (MA)
- Spouse: Bernardine Huang
- Parent(s): Richard Rogers; Ruth Rogers

Roo Rogers (born January 1975) is a British-American entrepreneur, business designer and author based in London.

Rogers is currently the CEO of Johannesburg-based venture development company Founders Factory Africa.

== Early life and education ==
Rogers was born in January 1975 to his parents Richard Rogers, architect, and Ruth Rogers, chef and restaurateur of The River Café London (from 1996, Lord and Lady Rogers). He received his B.A. from Columbia College and his Masters in Development Economics from University College London.

== Career ==
In 2013, Rogers was a partner at fuseproject.

While at fuseproject, Rogers launched a business-accelerator named SPRING.

In 2007, Rogers, with his wife, Bernardine Huang, co-founded OZOLab a venture company that invests in ecological-minded businesses and patented products such as OZOwater (with Jordan Harris). In 2005, the first OZOLab venture, OZOcar, was launched. Operating as a kinder, gentler car service option, OZOcar used environmentally-conscious vehicles and was sold in 2014 to FCS. Rogers was also president of RedScout Ventures from 2009 until June 2012.

In October 2018, Rogers became chief executive officer of the venture development company Founders Factory Africa. The company, which is backed by corporate partners including Standard Bank Group and Netcare, focuses on supporting technology-enabled startups across Africa through product development, engineering, business development, and access to funding. It has stated plans to support and scale startups across multiple countries on the continent.

=== Media ===
Rogers is also an active writer and commentator on the sharing economy. In 2010, he co-authored, with Rachel Botsman, What's Mine Is Yours: The Rise of Collaborative Consumption, which analyzes the rise of the collaborative consumption movement and explores the impact of the movement on individuals, communities and business models. In 2004, he founded we:nited magazine, a non-profit magazine and blog targeted towards young people in conjunction with the 2004 US Presidential Elections.

Rogers co-founded Drive Thru Pictures and Drive Thru Films in 2000, with the companies producing documentaries about political and social issues aimed at youth audiences. In the early 2000s, Drive Thru Pictures was one of the largest television companies in the UK, with clients such as BBC, MTV and The Rolling Stones. Rogers was the executive producer of the 2006 documentary Office Tigers and 2008's The Biggest Chinese Restaurant in the World, which received harsh criticism for the way in which the tigers were treated prior to slaughter and cooking. In 2009, he also starred in a Metamucil advertisement for which he won an award.

== Personal life ==
Rogers lives in London with his wife, Bernie, and their three children.
