= John Miller (architect) =

British architect (1930–2024)

John Harmsworth Miller CBE (18 August 1930 – 24 February 2024) was a British architect. He is best known for major projects with universities and museums in England and Scotland including Tate Britain, the Whitechapel Gallery, the Fitzwilliam Museum, the Scottish National Gallery, and Newham College, Cambridge. Born on 18 August 1930, Miller died on 24 February 2024, at the age of 93.

Sir Nicholas Serota, a British curator and former director of the Tate and the Whitechapel Gallery, has commented on Miller's work: "Like a well cut suit, the elegance of his architectural language has an ease which conceals the rigour and determination of his practice."

== Career ==
Miller studied at the Architectural Association (AA) from 1950 to 1956, where his tutors included British architect Peter Smithson. He attended the AA alongside Patrick Hodgkinson, Kenneth Frampton and Neave Brown and other prominent British architects and critics. The AA has described Miller as one of "the golden generation of post-war [AA] students". After graduating from the AA, in the late 1950s and early 1960s, Miller worked for architectural firms in London including Lyons Israel Ellis.

In 1961 Miller co-founded the architectural practice Colquhoun + Miller with British architect Alan Colquhoun. Miller's wife Su Rogers joined the practice in 1986. In 1989 Colquhoun left the practice, which became John Miller and Partners. Notable projects completed by Miller and the firm included:

- Forest Gate School, London (1965);
- Royal Holloway chemistry laboratories (1970);
- Pillwood House in Cornwall (1974), which was awarded Grade ll listed status by Historic England in 2017;
- an extension and renovation of the Whitechapel Gallery, which won a RIBA Regional Architecture Award (1987);
- the Queen's Building, University of East Anglia, which won a RIBA National Award for Architecture (1995);
- a renovation of the Serpentine Gallery (1998);
- the Centenary Development at Tate Britain, which was the most significant change to the gallery since its creation in 1897, adding 10 new and five refurbished exhibition spaces (2001);
- the new Horner-Markwick Library at Newham College, Cambridge (2004);
- the courtyard extension of the Fitzwilliam Museum, Cambridge (2004);
- the Weston link connecting the Scottish National Gallery and the Royal Scottish Academy in Edinburgh (2004).

In the 2006 New Year Honours, Miller was appointed Commander of the Order of the British Empire (CBE) for services to architecture.

During his career, Miller had various academic appointments including Visiting Critic at Cornell University (1966–71), Visiting Critic at Princeton University (1970), Professor of Environmental Design at the Royal College of Art (1975–85), visiting professor at Trinity College Dublin (1985–86), visiting professor at University of Manchester (1986–89), Fellow of Royal College of Art (1976), Fellow of Royal Society of Arts (1984) and Honorary Fellow of the Royal College of Art (1985).
