= InterContinental London Park Lane =

Hotel in London, England

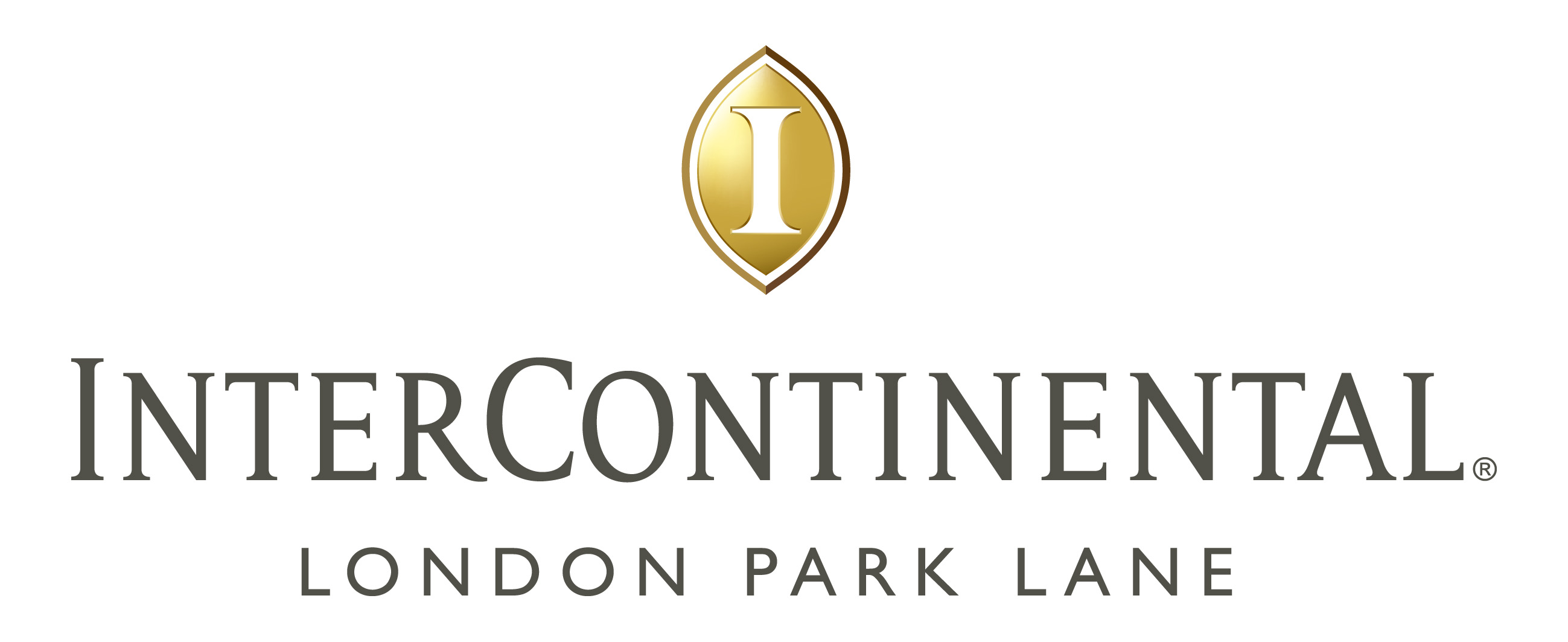

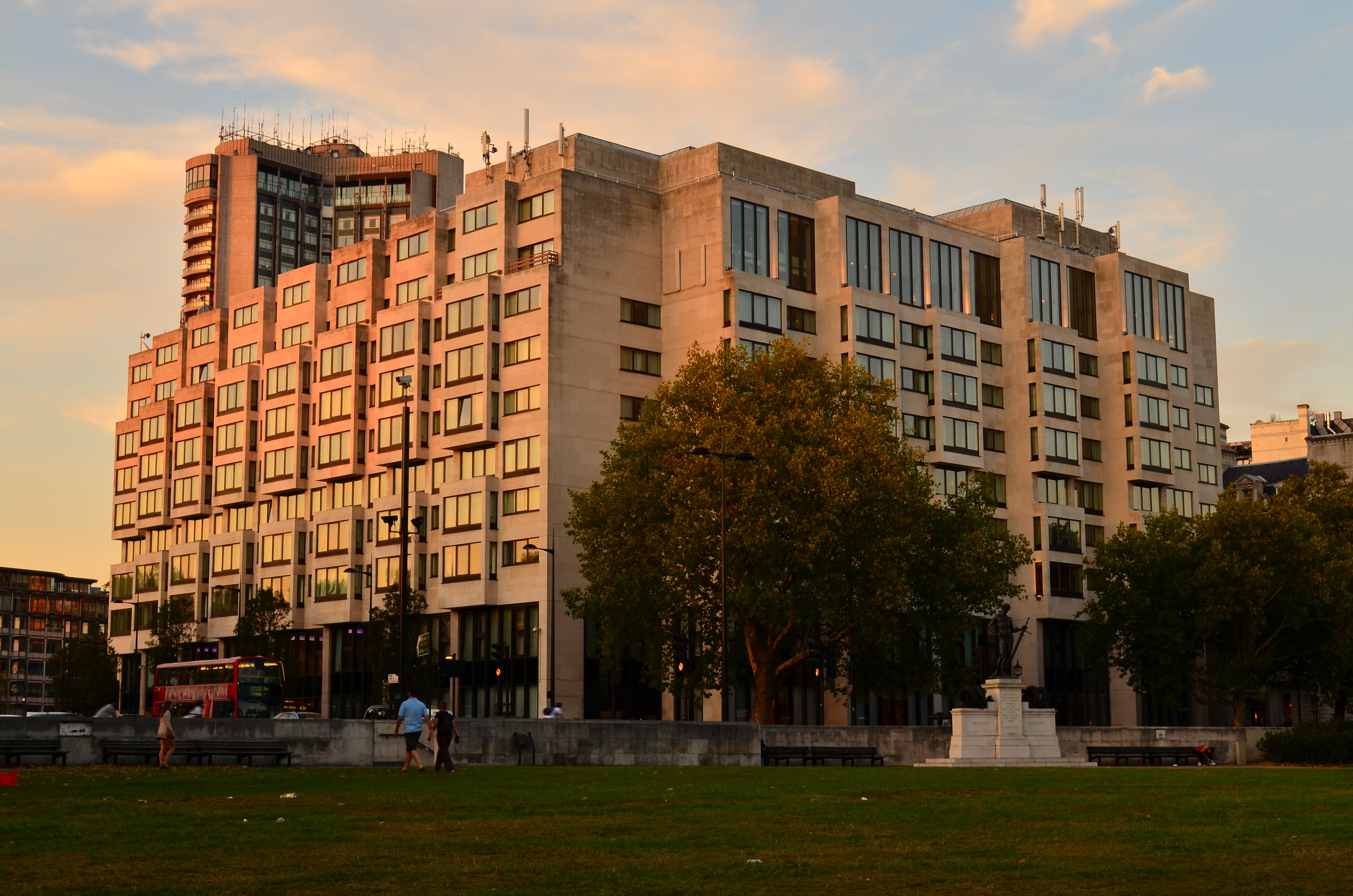
- Hotel chain: InterContinental Hotels & Resorts

General information
- Classification: 5*
- Location: 1 Hamilton Place, Park Lane, Knightsbridge, London, England
- Coordinates: 51°30′14″N 0°09′01″W
- Opening: 23 September 1975
- Owner: Qatar Investment Authority

Technical details
- Floor count: 8

Design and construction
- Architect: Frederick Gibberd

Other information
- Number of rooms: 449
- Number of suites: 75
- Number of restaurants: 2
- Public transit: Hyde Park Corner tube station

Website
- parklane.intercontinental.com

InterContinental London Park Lane is a luxury five-star hotel in London, England operated by the InterContinental Hotels Group. It is located at 1 Hamilton Place on Hyde Park Corner with Park Lane, close to the shopping center of Knightsbridge and Piccadilly.

== History ==
The hotel is built on the site of a series of townhouses that included 145 Piccadilly, the childhood home of Queen Elizabeth II. The townhouses were destroyed in World War II. The hotel was designed by Sir Frederick Gibberd. It was officially opened by Valerian Wellesley, 8th Duke of Wellington on 23 September 1975 as the Inter-Continental London.

The hotel underwent a £75 million refurbishment in 2007. In 2013, InterContinental Hotels Group sold the hotel for £301.5 million to Constellation Hotels, a division of the Qatar Investment Authority, which simultaneously bought the freehold to the land under the hotel for £100 million from the Crown Estate. The hotel continues to be managed by InterContinental under a thirty-year contract, with three additional ten-year extension options.

== Facilities ==
InterContinental London Park Lane has 449 rooms, including 75 expansive suites. It has a dedicated conference floor, including a ballroom.

InterContinental London Park Lane has three restaurants. The main dining restaurant has been run by chef Theo Randall since 2006. Other food and drink services in the building include the Wellington Lounge and the Arch Bar.

== Awards ==
The hotel was named England's Leading Conference Hotel by the World Travel Awards in 2016, and the UK's Best Business Hotel by Business Traveller in 2020.
