= 1996 Special Honours =

British government recognitions

As part of the British honours system, Special Honours are issued at the Monarch's pleasure at any given time. The Special Honours refer to the awards made within royal prerogative, operational honours and other honours awarded outside the New Years Honours and Birthday Honours

== Life Peer ==
=== Baronesses ===
- Dame Joyce (Anne) Anelay, D.B.E., Former Chairman, Conservative Women's National Committee.
- Dame Hazel Byford, D.B.E., President, National Union of Conservative and Unionist Associations.
- Meta Ramsay, International Affairs Consultant, Foreign Policy Adviser to the Leader of the Opposition, 1992-1994, HM Diplomatic Service 1969-1991.
- Elizabeth Conway Symons, General Secretary, Association of First Division Civil Servants. Member, Employment Appeals Tribunal and General Council of the TUC, Equal Opportunities Commissioner.

=== Barons ===
- Peter Selwyn Gummer, Chairman, Shandwick plc. Chairman Designate, Royal Opera House.
- Sir Ian (Charter) MacLaurin, D.L., Chairman, Tesco PLC.
- Maurice Saatchi, Chairman, M & C Saatchi Agency.
- John David Beckett Taylor, Barrister-at-Law, Presenter and Writer.
- Professor David Anthony Currie, Professor of Economics and former Deputy Principal, London Business School.
- Swraj Paul, Chairman, Caparo Group Ltd.
- Sir Richard (George) Rogers, Architect; Chairman, Richard Rogers Architects Ltd., London, Tokyo and Berlin. Vice-Chairman of the Arts Council of England. Chairman, Architectural Federation. Chairman, National Tenants Resource Centre.
- John Lawrence (Larry) Whitty, European Co-ordinator, Labour Party. General Secretary, Labour Party, 1985-1994.
- John Alderdice, Leader of the Alliance Party of Northern Ireland. Consultant Psychotherapist, Belfast.
- Martin Thomas, O.B.E., Q.C., a Recorder of the Crown Court. President of the Welsh Liberal Democrats.

== Royal Victorian Order ==
=== Lieutenant (LVO) ===
- Charles Patrick Neville Noble, M.V.O.

=== Member (LVO) ===
- Kevan Barry Yoxall, R.V.M.

== Royal Victorian Medal (RVM) ==
=== Royal Victorian Medal (Silver) ===
- James Thomas George Mist.
