= Su Rogers =

British architect (born 1939)

- Born: Susan Jane Brumwell; 22 February 1939 (age 87)
- Education: Frensham Heights School, London School of Economics, Yale School of Architecture
- Occupation: Architect
- Spouses: Richard Rogers (m. 1960, div. 1970s); John Miller (m. 1985)
- Children: 4
- Parent(s): Marcus Brumwell and Irene Brumwell
- Practice: Team 4 (1963–67); Richard and Su Rogers Architects (1967–70); Piano + Rogers Architects (1970–72); Colquhoun Miller and Partners (1986–90); John Miller + Partners (1990–2011)
- Buildings: Creek Vean, Pillwood House (Pill Creek), 22 Parkside, Centre Georges Pompidou.
- Design: Zip-Up House

Susan Jane Rogers (née Brumwell; born 22 February 1939) is a British designer and educator. She was a co-founder and partner during the 1960s and 1970s in two architectural practices Team 4 and Richard + Su Rogers. From 1986 to 2011, she was a partner in Colquhoun, Miller and Partners (later John Miller + Partners). Rogers was a member of the team that won the design competition for the Pompidou Centre in the 1970s, and she co-designed the concept Zip-Up House in the 1960s. She was also responsible for two notable commissions from her parents: Creek Vean (Team 4) and Pillwood House (Colquhoun, Miller and Partners), which are both Grade II* listed buildings.

== Private life and education ==
Rogers was born in 1939 to Marcus Brumwell and Irene Brumwell. Her father was the managing director of Stuart Advertising Agency and later founded the Design Research Unit. She attended Frensham Heights School, and later studied for a Bachelor of Science degree in Sociology at the London School of Economics and then Town Planning at Yale School of Architecture (1961–63).

She met Richard Rogers, an architect, at the LSE, and they married in 1960. Su and Richard Rogers had three sons together: Ab Rogers, the former head of interior design at the Royal College of Art, Ben Rogers, Director of Centre for London, and Zad Rogers, a founding director of Atomized Studios, a video production firm. The couple divorced in the early 1970s.

She married her second husband, John Miller, an architect, in 1985 and joined his firm the following year. John was a partner in Colquhoun + Partners (1961–1989) and later John Miller + Partners (1989–2011). He was also Professor of Environmental Design at the Royal College of Art (1975–1985). Rogers has two step-daughters, Sarah Miller, a former editor of Conde Naste Traveller, and Harriet Miller, a painter and tutor at the Royal Drawing School.

== Career ==
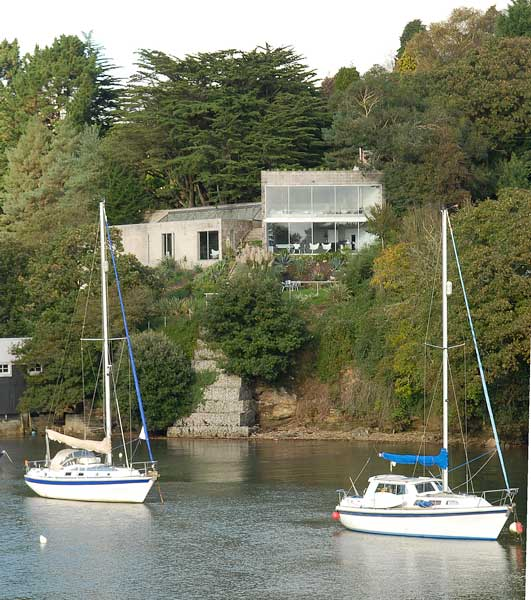
Creek Vean, Pill Lane, Feock, Cornwall

In 1963, Rogers co-founded Team 4 along with her then-husband Richard Rogers, Norman Foster, and Wendy Cheesman, who later married Foster. Friction emerged within the firm, and in June 1967 they decided to dissolve the partnership. One of the first projects for Team 4 was a commission from Brumwell's parents, Marcus and Irene, to build a new house in Feock, Cornwall, called Creek Vean. They sold a Piet Mondrian painting bought from the artist in the 1930s to fund the new house. Creek Vean is a listed building, having been listed Grade II in 1998, and subsequently upgraded to Grade II*. The practice also designed a planning scheme of 120 houses for Wates Housing, at Coulsdon, Surrey. Richard Rogers claimed that it was "probably the most important project of our Team 4 period". The practice also designed Skybreak House in Radlett, Hertfordshire, built between 1965 and 1966. The interior of the house was used in the film A Clockwork Orange. The final project for Team 4 was the Reliance Controls building in Swindon, which was completed in 1967.

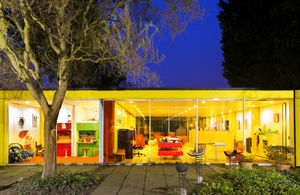
22 Parkside, Wimbledon, London

After Team 4 had dissolved, she co-founded Richard + Su Rogers Architects, which was active until around 1970. The partnership designed a house for Richard's parents William Nino and Dada Rogers at 22 Parkside, Wimbledon, London. Earlier Richard and Su Rogers had designed the concept house Zip-Up House, which was never built although the concept was used for 22 Parkside.

In 1971 Su and Richard Rogers joined forces with Italian architect Renzo Piano in a new partnership, Piano + Rogers. The partnership designed the Pompidou Centre. The partnership ended in 1977, although Su Rogers had left the practice earlier in 1972 to become Unit Master at the Architectural Association (1972–1976) and as a tutor at the Royal College of Art (1975–1985). From 1977 to 1986, she was Director of the Royal College of Art Project Office.

Pompidou Centre in Paris

In 1986, she became a partner in Colquhoun, Miller and Partners, which became John Miller + Partners in 1990. The practice specialised in university buildings, art galleries, and affordable housing. Notable projects included:

- In 1999, the practice won an international competition to design the refurbishment of the Royal Scottish Academy.
- In 2001, John Miller + Partners completed the redevelopment of Tate Britain.
- In 2004, the practice completed the renovation of the Fitzwilliam Museum in Cambridge.

John Miller + Partners was dissolved in 2011.

During her career, Rogers has been a visiting tutor at the following universities:

- Department of Architecture, University of Cambridge
- Welsh School of Architecture, Cardiff University
- Columbia Graduate School of Architecture, Planning and Preservation, Columbia University, New York City
- University College Dublin, Ireland
- University of Toronto, Canada
- School of Interior Design, Kingston Polytechnic
- School of Art, Design and Architecture, Plymouth Polytechnic
- Liverpool John Moores University

== See also ==
- List of British architects
