= The River Cafe (London) =

Restaurant in London, England

The River Café
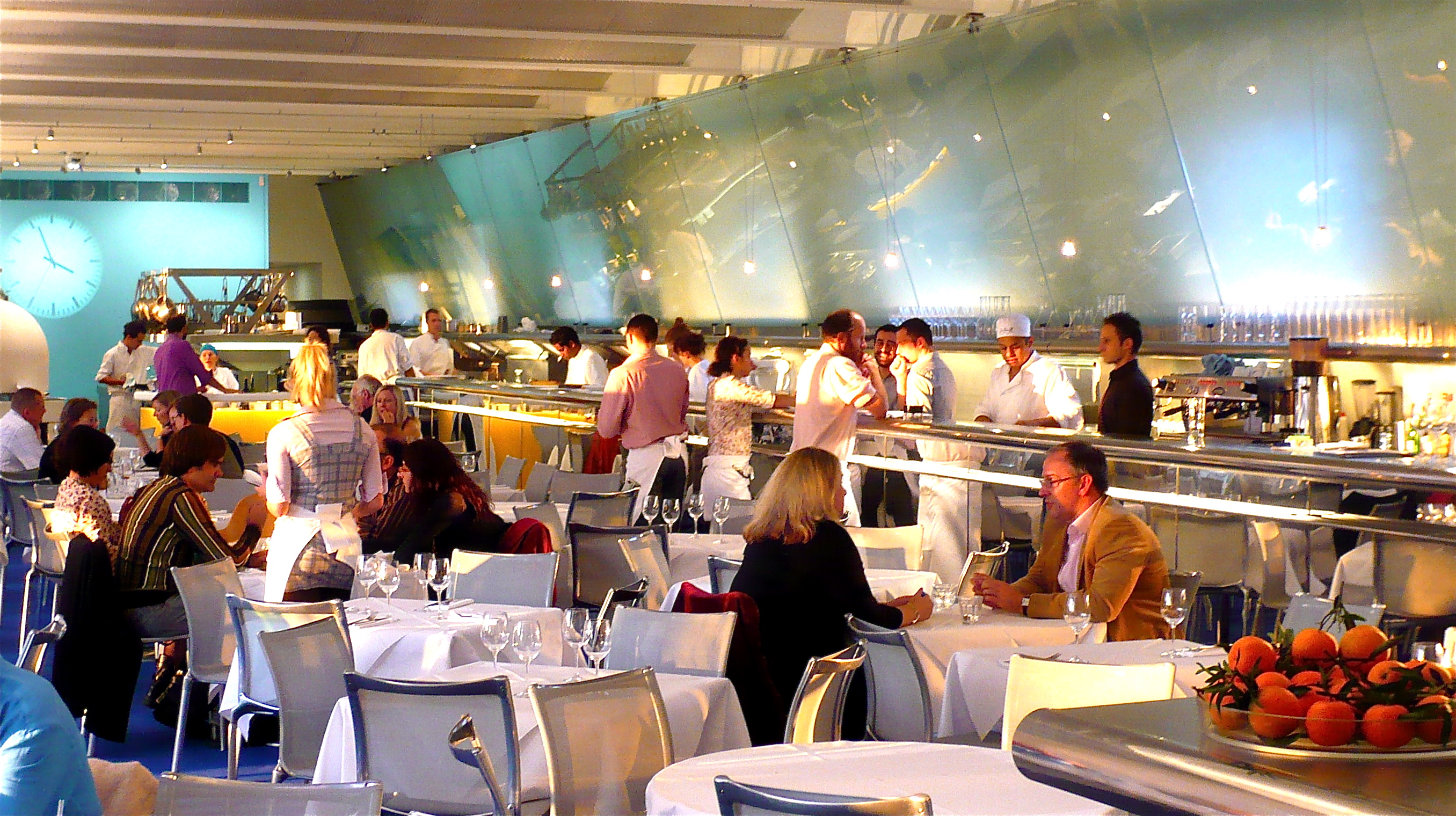
- The restaurant in 2008
- Interactive map of The River Café

Restaurant information
- Established: 1987; 39 years ago
- Food type: Italian cuisine
- Location: Rainville Rd, London W6 9HA, London, United Kingdom
- Coordinates: 51°29′3″N 0°13′28″W

The River Café is a restaurant in the Borough of Hammersmith and Fulham, London, specialising in Italian cuisine. It was owned and run by chefs Ruth Rogers and Rose Gray until Gray's death in 2010; since then, Rogers has been the sole owner and has run the restaurant. It earned a Michelin star in 1997.

== Location ==
The restaurant is located on the north bank of the Thames in Hammersmith, in the former Duckhams oil storage facility; the nearest railway station being Hammersmith tube station. The facility was modified to alternative use by architect Lord Rogers, the husband of Ruth Rogers (Lady Rogers). The restaurant originally opened in 1987 as the employee café of the architectural partnership. The restaurant has a garden area with views of the River Thames.

== History ==
The restaurant's signature dishes include wild mushroom risotto, Dover sole, and John Dory smoked in the restaurant's own wood stove, as well as rich Italian desserts including lemon almond cake and the chocolate "Nemesis" cake. The restaurant earned a Michelin star in 1997.

The River Café is also notable for the number of successful chefs who have trained in its kitchens. These include Theo Randall, Ed Baines of Randall & Aubin, April Bloomfield of the Spotted Pig in New York, and celebrity chefs Jamie Oliver, Hugh Fearnley-Whittingstall, Ben O'Donoghue and Tobie Puttock.

Rose Gray with Jamie Oliver at the River Cafe

Rogers and Gray were named in the 2010 New Year's Honours List as Members of the British Empire (MBE) with the citation "for services to the Hospitality Industry". On 28 February 2010, Gray died of cancer, aged 71.

== Cookery books ==
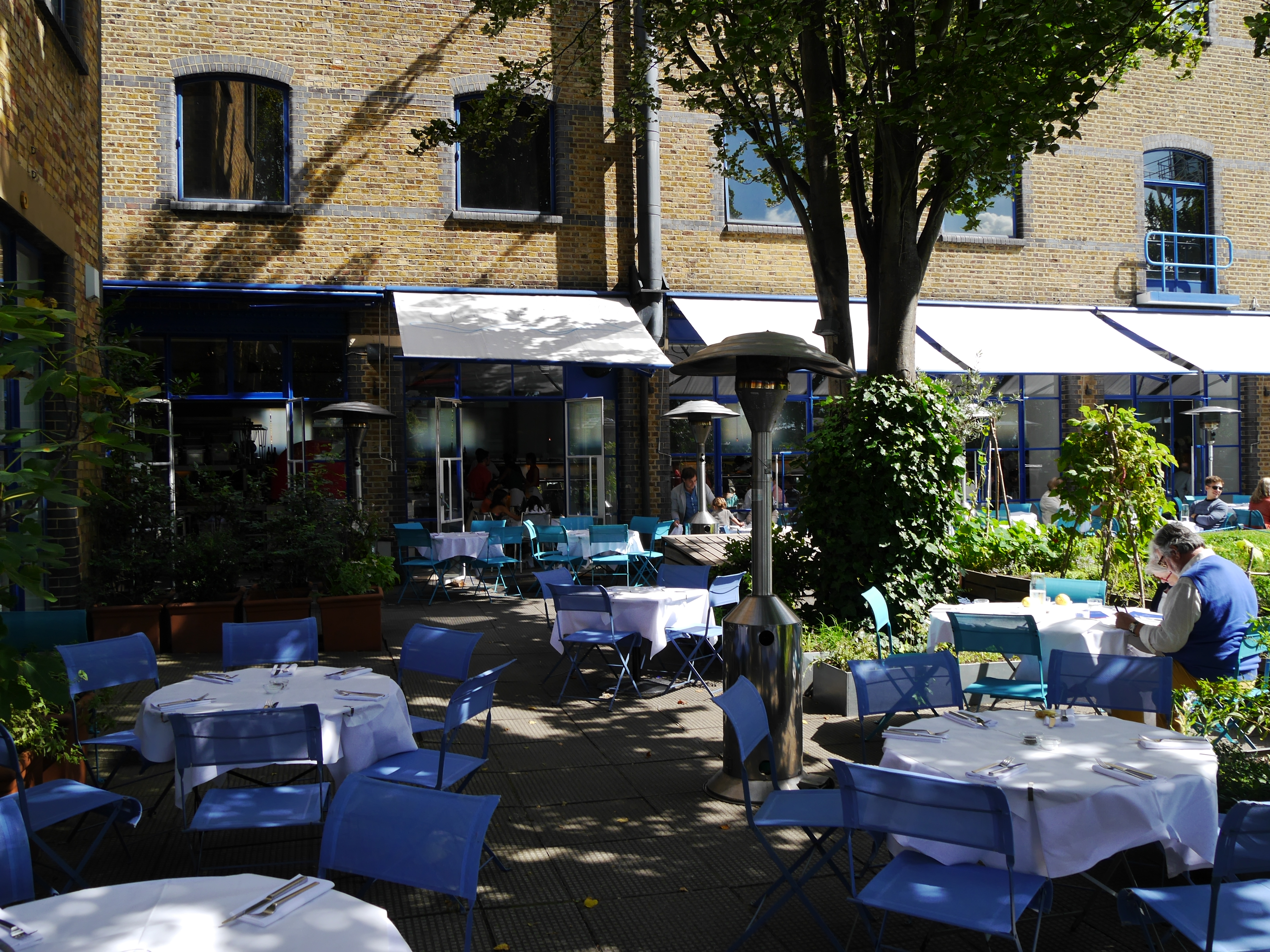
The restaurant's outside patio in 2014

Rogers and Gray have written six cookbooks, including Italian Easy and The London River Café Cook Book. Their first book, Italian Country Cookbook won the Glenfiddich Award for Food Book of the Year and the BCA Illustrated Book of the Year award. They have since presented a 12-part series for Channel 4, The Italian Kitchen. The River Cafe Cookbook, published in 1995, has been described as "iconic" for its photography.

== See also ==
- List of Italian restaurants
