= 22 Parkside =

Residential property in Wimbledon, London, England

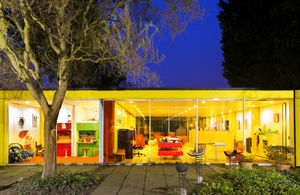
- Alternative names: Rogers House, Wimbledon House

General information
- Architectural style: Modernist architecture
- Location: 22 Parkside Wimbledon, London, England
- Coordinates: 51.4267°N 0.2221°W
- Construction started: 1968
- Construction stopped: 1969
- Client: Dr and Mrs Rogers
- Owner: Harvard Graduate School of Design

Technical details
- Floor count: 1
- Floor area: 257 m^{2} (2,770 sq ft)

Design and construction
- Architects: Project Architects: Richard Rogers, Su Rogers née Brumwell; Pierre Botschi; John Doggart; Ingrid Morris; Richard Russell; John Young
- Architecture firm: Richard and Su Rogers Architects
- Structural engineer: Anthony Hunt Associates
- Quantity surveyor: GA Hanscomb Partnership

Listed Building – Grade II*
- Official name: 22 Parkside
- Designated: 22 February 2013
- Reference no.: 1409979

22 Parkside (also known as the Rogers House or Wimbledon House) is a residential property in Wimbledon, London, designed in 1967 by British architect Richard Rogers and his then wife, Su Rogers, and built in 1968–70. The house is located at 22 Parkside, Wimbledon, south-west London, near Wimbledon Common. Since 22 February 2013, it has been a Grade II* listed building. In 2015 the building was renovated and donated to the Harvard Graduate School of Design, who operated it as a research base for international students under the Richard Rogers Fellowship until 2021 when ownership returned to the Richard Rogers Charitable Settlement. On 9 September 2026, it was announced that the property would be taken into the care of the National Trust.

== Introduction ==
22 Parkside on the A219 is a single-storey house designed in 1967 for Rogers' parents (Dr. William Nino and Dada Rogers) by Rogers and his then wife, Su. Set in a narrow plot of woodland just opposite Wimbledon Common, the house was built in 1968–70. It is a notable early example of Rogers' work. The house was adapted and extended by Rogers' son Ab, who moved into the house with his family in 1998. In 2015 Richard Rogers donated the house to the Harvard Graduate School of Design. It was renovated by architect Philip Gumuchdjian, who restored it to its original design. Harvard Graduate School of Design use the building as part of a residency programme that host students.

== Design ==
The single-storey modernist house is made from bright yellow-painted steel ribs with full-height glazing at each end, and is separated into two parts. The first part is a flat and pottery studio for Rogers' mother, with the main house set in trees behind. Day space includes a large open-plan kitchen, living room and dining room. There are a master bedroom, two small bedrooms, a bathroom and utility room. Two opposite sides of the house, north-east and south-west, have ceiling-to-wall glass with views onto the grounds, which consist of a courtyard and landscaped gardens. The roof is flat and covered in felt. Rogers himself believes this to be among the best example of his early work. Rogers said that the approach he used to design this early work, such as the use of prefabricated steel and glass modules, served as an inspiration for much of his future work, which includes the Centre Georges Pompidou, co-designed with Renzo Piano, and the Grade I listed Lloyd's building.

In listing it, English Heritage gave four reasons: its architectural and structural interest, historic interest, experimental use of materials and techniques and its intactness. Architecturally, they called it "an early, executed example of a High-Tech, steel-framed house in Britain" commenting on the significance of "prefabricated components" and "neoprene gaskets". Historically, they described it as "an important early work by a very significant architectural practice", and "a highly significant, surviving early British High-Tech building". With regard to material and techniques, English Heritage cited the use of "factory-finished components and dry construction", the "lightness and precision of steel", allowing "clear spans required for open-plan living and flexibility". As for intactness, it was noted that "the intention, structure and main built-in fittings are clearly legible, alongside later modifications, an endorsement of its versatility."

== Ownership ==
The house has been owned entirely by the Rogers' family since it was built. Since 1988 the house has been occupied by Rogers' son Ab and his family and the property was extended before being put up for sale in 2013 for £3.2 million. The property was never sold and the house was taken off the market. Rogers' charity, the Richard Rogers Charitable Settlement, donated it to the Harvard Graduate School of Design, providing a resource for students studying architecture. Rogers said "The house will be a gift to Harvard for training of doctorates in the field of architecture – my charity is giving it to them."

In 2021 ownership of the property returned to the Richard Rogers Charitable Settlement after Harvard Global UK ceased operations. The property was donated to the National Trust in September 2026.

== Sources ==
=== References ===
- Irving, Mark (2012). 1001 Houses You Must See Before You Die. London: Cassell Illustrated. ISBN 978-1-84403-738-4.
