= One-off housing =

Irish term for individual rural houses

One-off housing is a term used in Ireland to refer to the building of individual rural houses, outside of towns and villages. The term is used to contrast with housing developments where multiple units are constructed as part of a housing estate or city street. Less commonly, the term is used to refer to infill housing in suburban areas.

== Characteristics ==
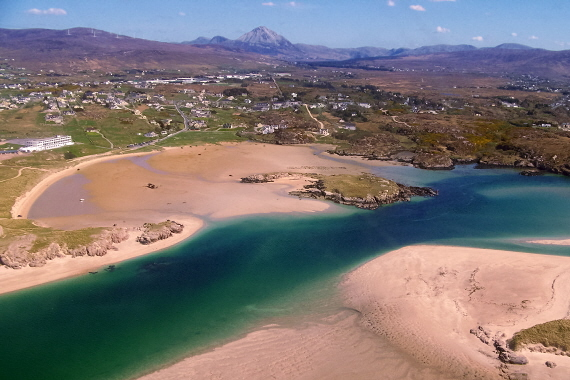
One-off houses in Gweedore, County Donegal

Other than being located outside any town or village, a typical one-off house built in the last twenty years is likely to be a bungalow of concrete block construction 1,500–2,500 square feet in floor area, with a rectangular footprint and a pitched roof.

One-off houses exist in many forms and the builder has autonomy over what design features to incorporate, in contrast to the uniform characteristics often found in more mass-produced forms of housing such as tract housing, prefabricated housing, and apartment buildings. Nevertheless, one-off construction does not guarantee any architectural merit or uniqueness as plans are readily available off the shelf.

A septic tank is used for sewage treatment, a well is drilled to provide freshwater, while a satellite dish provides television reception.

=== Provision of services ===
In remote areas provision of services to one-off houses using public utilities can be prohibitively expensive or simply unavailable and an alternative will need to be arranged

=== Sewerage ===
- Septic tank
- Cesspit
- Composting toilet

=== Electricity ===
- Photovoltaics
- Wind turbine
- Micro hydro

=== Communication ===
- Mobile broadband
- 5G
- Satellite internet
- Satellite phone

=== Water ===
- Rainwater harvesting
- Well

== Prevalence ==
=== Ireland ===
Government officials stated at a planning conference in 2001 that 36% of dwellings built in 2000 in Ireland were one-off houses. Recent years have seen a huge increase in the supply of all types of housing in Ireland with 547,000 houses, equivalent to a third of the total national housing stock, built in the period 1996–2006

A 2002 publication by the ESRI reported that one-third of Ireland's housing stock consists of one-off houses.

Of 11,604 houses granted planning permission in Ireland in 2010, 48% were for one-off houses.

== Debate ==
The debate centers around the presumed rights of Irish people to live where and how they like versus the presumed obligation of the Irish state to curtail development patterns that it considers detrimental to society as a whole. There is a spectrum of opinion ranging from those who would oppose or allow all isolated rural development to those who would allow for isolated rural development in various circumstances.

=== Right to build on one's own land ===
There are two versions of this argument: that people should have the right to either build on land they own or else that people should have the right to build a house near to where their families live.

Surely, if the culture of rural areas is to be preserved, then people from the countryside should not be routinely denied the opportunity to build a family home in their place of origin.

— Éamon Ó Cuív

=== Traditional land use patterns ===
Dr Séamus Caulfield, retired professor of archaeology at University College Dublin, has stated that Irish Stone Age rural settlements were dispersed throughout the countryside but that in recent years planners were using British Anglo-Saxon planning models that emphasise "settlement in urban areas – nucleation settlements".

Minister for the Environment, Dick Roche, has supported the view that one-off housing is a continuation of the traditional land use patterns in Ireland for millennia.

We have a dispersed pattern of settlement going back thousands of years.

In contrast, An Tasice has argued that early settlements were nucleated and communal, often surrounded by ringforts for protection. It also argues that the environmental effects of one-off housing in the Stone Age were different from those observed in a car-dependent modern lifestyle.

=== Tourism ===
Tourism is one of the most important sectors in the Irish economy contributing up to €6 billion to the Irish economy annually. 80% of all holidaymakers visiting Ireland in 2006 listed the 'beautiful scenery' and 74% cited 'unspoilt environment' as key motivating factors in visiting Ireland. The continued policy mandating the proliferation of one-off rural housing will result in an erosion of the rural and natural environment and directly threatens the future viability of the Irish tourism sector.

=== Health ===
Because the residents of one-off housing are more car-dependent than those living in towns and villages, organisations such as An Taisce have stated that these groups are more likely to suffer from obesity.

Senator Mary Henry has pointed out that one-off houses are often built without any footpath connection to a local town, thus discouraging walking.

=== Energy Use ===
Irish organisations such as FEASTA (The foundation for the economics of sustainability) and COMHAR (The national sustainable development partnership), have made the case that the increased demand for private car use that follows from one-off housing development will lead to a greater average carbon footprint for residents of this type of dwelling. Increased CO_{2} pollution will, they claim, have negative environmental implications and lead to possible fines under the Kyoto Protocol.

=== Lower quality and higher-priced services ===
By their dispersed nature, one-off houses are built further away from commercial, utility, social and emergency services than urban dwellings. As a result, the cost of providing these services is increased.

Even where services are sold at the same price as in urban areas, the quality is often poorer with, for example, frequent electricity power cuts, potholed roads, longer waits for emergency services, and poor quality of internet access.

=== Subsidies ===
The increased cost of service provision to one-off houses must be paid either by the householder or absorbed by the service provider. In the latter case, The Irish Planning Institute has referred to this cost transfer as a subsidy.

...in the postal service...all householders pay the same price for the service although deliveries to country homes cost 4 times more

— Dr Diarmuid O Grada, MIPI

The same report identified other subsidies to one-off housing as: school transport, rural road maintenance, increased costs when upgrading national roads, environmental costs from pollution due to septic tanks, and uneven application of social and affordable housing levies between urban and rural houses.

By contrast, supporters of one-off housing speculate that subsidies may be paid by rural taxpayers whenever large infrastructure projects are constructed by the state in Dublin from central exchequer funds.

Certain people in urban areas are concerned that it is their tax euro that are subventing those of us based outside the pale. Who has paid for the infrastructure projects on the east coast, such as Luas, the port tunnel and other large-scale multi-million pound projects?

— Senator Timmy Dooley

However, other commentators see one-off housing as actually undermining efforts to deliver national infrastructure, and unambiguously transferring costs to urban and suburban dwellers. Economist David McWilliams writes

Let us be very clear: if we have one-off housing, we cannot have a functioning public transport system, public health service, public education system or postal system, never mind universal access to broadband or cable. ...

So who pays? The worker who has abided by the laws, who has bought a place in a town or a village and who is not lucky enough to inherit land.

It has been argued by Éamon Ó Cuív, T.D., Minister for Community, Rural and Gaeltacht Affairs, that the marginal cost of supplying services to new one-off houses is low. Irish planning commentator James Nix says

The Minister's primary argument can be described as "the house at the end of the valley point". It posits the following: where utility lines, pipelines and post are already delivered to a house at the end of a valley, then there can be no argument against ribbon development on the road leading to that house. It must be said that this argument has an initial attractiveness to it. To some extent, however, it overlooks the fact that the "house at the end of the valley" is usually served at shoestring capacity. In other words a whole new infrastructure would be required to accommodate the addition of three or four houses on the road going into the valley.

Even where the services leading to the house at the end of the valley have untapped capacity, the previously expressed criticisms of urban-focused one-off housing are not displaced. The postal company still has to serve an additional three or four houses using a van or car. Household wastes are more expensive to collect or treat, and so on. Finally, the house at the end of the road into the valley is likely to be connected with a farming or forestry concern. It generates comparatively few traffic movements as compared with commuter-focused housing.

=== Rural depopulation ===
It is argued by Dick Roche that

The most important ingredient in rural development is population.

The implication of this argument is that permitting one-off housing sustains rural populations by making it economically feasible for people to live in rural areas.

There are two counter-arguments: that one-off housing draws people out of rural towns and villages, stifling the growth of these regions, or else that population growth is not desirable in 'ultra-rural' areas that ought rather to become natural recreational areas with land-owners employed in land-maintenance, forestry and tourism-related services.

=== Appeal to motive arguments ===
Opponents of one-off housing sometimes claim the motivation for this type of development is financial. Their argument is that due to the presumed Irish property bubble, it has become far cheaper to build rather than buy a house in Ireland and that one-off housing regulations allow for the conversion of inexpensive agricultural land into plots often worth more than €150,000 per site. They argue that farmers have become reliant on housing as a cash crop, while one-off builders are motivated by the capital gains they expect to make on their property.

By contrast, advocates of one-off housing may characterise those who would limit this type of development as Dublin 4 urbanites motivated by a desire to maintain the hegemony of cities and put country people in their place. Opponents of one-off housing are sometimes compared to colonial British landlords from the era before Irish independence.

There could have been 40 houses on one road in my area – and, of course, the British landlords evicted them. Now unfortunate people are trying to get planning permission in those areas today but there is a new British landlord, An Taisce, objecting to them.

— Johnny Brady TD, Chairman of the Joint Committee on Agriculture and Food

== Proponents and opponents ==
One-off housing development is broadly supported by the former Minister for the Environment, Heritage and Local Government, Dick Roche, and by the Minister for Community, Rural and Gaeltacht Affairs, Éamon Ó Cuív. In 2005, the Irish government (a coalition between Fianna Fáil and the Progressive Democrats) introduced policy guidelines that detailed the circumstances under which one-off housing should be promoted. These guidelines were supported by Sinn Féin and Fine Gael (the largest opposition party).

The Irish Farmers Association and the Irish Rural Dwellers Association also promote one-off housing.

An Taisce, an Irish conservation organisation, maintains a policy against the proliferation of one-off housing development. Frank McDonald, a journalist with The Irish Times coined the term 'Bungalow Blitz' in a series of articles condemning one-off housing in the 1980s. This was a pun on the title of a popular book named 'Bungalow Bliss' by Jack Fitzsimons, that contained architectural plans for bungalows intended to be used by those building their own homes. The Irish Green Party opposes the proliferation of one-off housing development.

The Stop Bungalow Chaos Campaign Group also actively lobbies against the current status quo policies favouring the proliferation of one-off housing in Ireland.

== Circumstances under which one-off housing may be encouraged ==
Local authorities often allow one-off developments where they meet some of the following criteria:

- The applicant intends to farm the surrounding land
- The applicant's parents own the land in question and are farmers
- The applicant commits not to sell the house for a number of years
- The applicant was born in the local area
- The local area is suffering from depopulation
- The applicant intends to work in the local area and not use the house as a base to commute to a city.

According to Minister Éamon Ó Cuív, 80% of applications for one-off housing in Ireland are approved.

== See also ==
- Farmhouse
- Townland
- Tract housing
