= Richard Rogers =

British architect (1933–2021)

The Right Honourable The Lord Rogers of Riverside CH FRIBA FCSD HonFREng RA
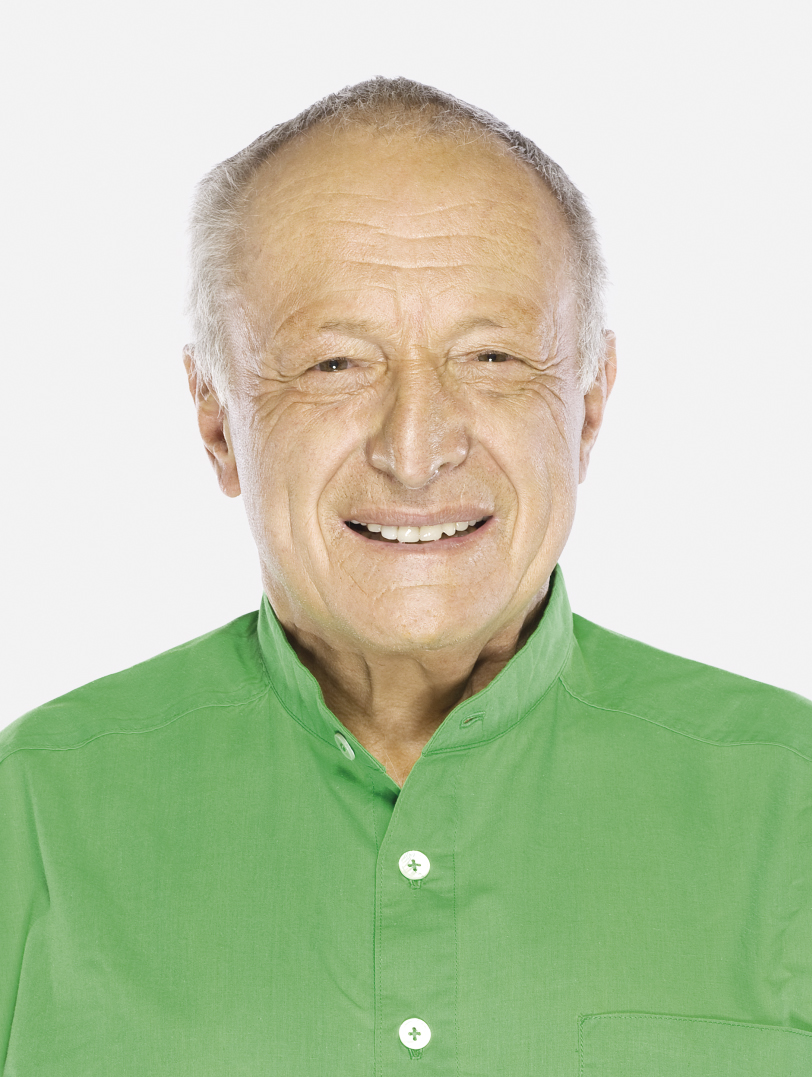
- Rogers in 2008
- Born: Richard George Rogers; 23 July 1933; Florence, Tuscany, Italy
- Died: 18 December 2021 (aged 88); London, England
- Education: Architectural Association; Yale School of Architecture
- Occupation: Architect
- Spouses: Su Brumwell (m. 1960, divorced) Ruth Elias (m. 1973)
- Children: 5, including Roo
- Awards: RIBA Gold Medal (1985); Knight Bachelor (1991); Thomas Jefferson Medal (1999); Praemium Imperiale (2000); Stirling Prize (2006, 2009); Minerva Medal (2007); Pritzker Prize (2007); HonFREng (2005)
- Practice: RSHP (2007–2020)
- Buildings: Centre Georges Pompidou; Lloyd's building (Grade I); Millennium Dome; European Court of Human Rights; Madrid–Barajas Airport terminal 4; Heathrow Terminal 5; Senedd, Cardiff
- Projects: Towards an Urban Renaissance; Grand Paris

Member of the House of Lords
- Lord Temporal
- Life peerage 17 October 1996 – 11 May 2021

Richard George Rogers, Baron Rogers of Riverside (23 July 1933 – 18 December 2021) was a British and Italian architect noted for his modernist and constructivist designs in high-tech architecture. He was the founder of RSHP, previously known as the Richard Rogers Partnership, until June 2020. After Rogers's retirement and death, the firm rebranded to simply RSHP on 30 June 2022.

Rogers was perhaps best known for his work on the Pompidou Centre in Paris, the Lloyd's building and Millennium Dome, both in London, the Senedd building, in Cardiff, and the European Court of Human Rights building, in Strasbourg. He was awarded the RIBA Gold Medal, the Thomas Jefferson Medal, the RIBA Stirling Prize, the Minerva Medal, and the 2007 Pritzker Prize.

== Early life and career ==
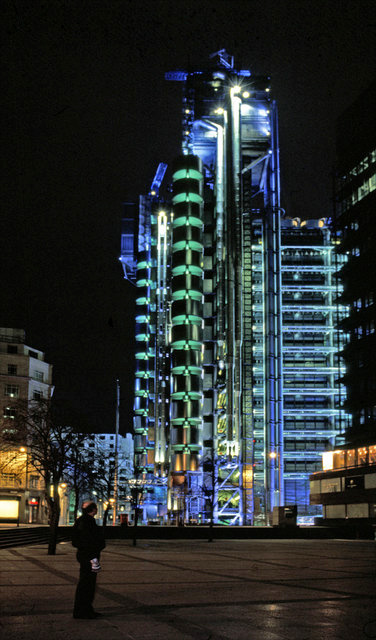
The Lloyd's Building in London at night

Richard Rogers was born in Florence, Tuscany, in 1933 into an Anglo-Italian family. His father, William Nino Rogers (1906–1993), was Jewish, and was the cousin of Italian Jewish architect Ernesto Nathan Rogers. His Jewish ancestors moved from Sunderland to Venice in about 1800, later settling in Trieste, Milan and Florence. In October 1938, William Nino Rogers came back to England, having fled Fascist Italy and anti-Jewish laws under Mussolini.

Upon moving to England, Richard Rogers went to St John's School, Leatherhead. Rogers did not excel academically, which made him believe that he was "stupid because he could not read or memorise his school work" and as a consequence, he said, he became "very depressed". He could not read until he was 11, and it was not until after he had his first child that Rogers realised he was dyslexic. After leaving St Johns School, he undertook a foundation course at Epsom School of Art (now the University for the Creative Arts) before going into National Service between 1951 and 1953.

He then attended the Architectural Association School of Architecture in London, where he gained the Architectural Association's Diploma (AA Dipl) from 1954 until 1959, subsequently graduating with a master's degree (M Arch) from the Yale School of Architecture in 1962 on a Fulbright Scholarship. While studying at Yale, Rogers met fellow architecture student Norman Foster and planning student Su Brumwell.

After leaving Yale he joined Skidmore, Owings & Merrill in New York City. On returning to England in 1963, he, Norman Foster and Brumwell set up architectural practice as Team 4 with Wendy Cheesman (Brumwell later married Rogers, Cheesman married Foster). Rogers and Foster earned a reputation for what was later termed by the media high-tech architecture.

By 1967, Team 4 had split up, but Rogers continued to collaborate with Su Rogers, along with John Young and Laurie Abbott. In early 1968 he was commissioned to design a house and studio for Humphrey Spender near Maldon, Essex, a glass cube framed with I-beams. He continued to develop his ideas of prefabrication and structural simplicity to design a Wimbledon house for his parents. This was based on ideas from his conceptual Zip-Up House.

Rogers subsequently joined forces with Italian architect Renzo Piano, a partnership that was to prove fruitful. His career leapt forward when he, Piano and Gianfranco Franchini won the design competition for the Pompidou Centre in July 1971, alongside a team from Ove Arup that included Irish engineer Peter Rice.

== Later career ==
After working with Piano, Rogers established the Richard Rogers Partnership along with Marco Goldschmied, Mike Davies, and John Young in 1977. This became Rogers Stirk Harbour + Partners in 2007. The firm maintains offices in London, Shanghai, and Sydney.

Rogers devoted much of his later career to wider issues surrounding architecture, urbanism, sustainability, and the ways in which cities are used. One early illustration of his thinking was an exhibition at the Royal Academy in 1986, entitled "London As It Could Be", which also featured the work of James Stirling and Rogers's former partner Norman Foster. This exhibition made public a series of proposals for transforming a large area of central London, subsequently dismissed as impractical by the city's authorities.

The Pompidou Centre in Paris

In 1995, he became the first architect to deliver the BBC's annual Reith Lectures. This series of five talks, titled Sustainable City, were later adapted into the book Cities for a Small Planet (Faber and Faber: London 1997, ISBN 0-571-17993-2). The BBC made these lectures available to the public for download in July 2011.

In 1998, he set up the Urban Task Force at the invitation of the British government, to help identify causes of urban decline and establish a vision of safety, vitality, and beauty for Britain's cities. This work resulted in a white paper, Towards an Urban Renaissance, outlining recommendations for future city designers. Rogers also served for several years as chair of the Greater London Authority panel for Architecture and Urbanism. He was chair of the board of Trustees of The Architecture Foundation.

From 2001 to 2008, he was chief advisor on architecture and urbanism to the then Mayor of London Ken Livingstone. In 2008, he was asked to continue on in his role as an advisor by the then new mayor Boris Johnson. He stood down from the post in October 2009. Rogers also served as an advisor to two mayors of Barcelona on urban strategies.

The Senedd building

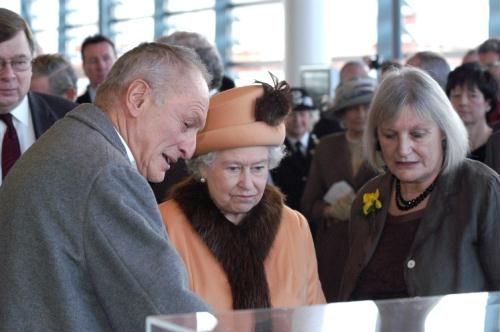
Rogers (left) with Queen Elizabeth II and Sue Essex AM (right), at the opening of the Senedd building

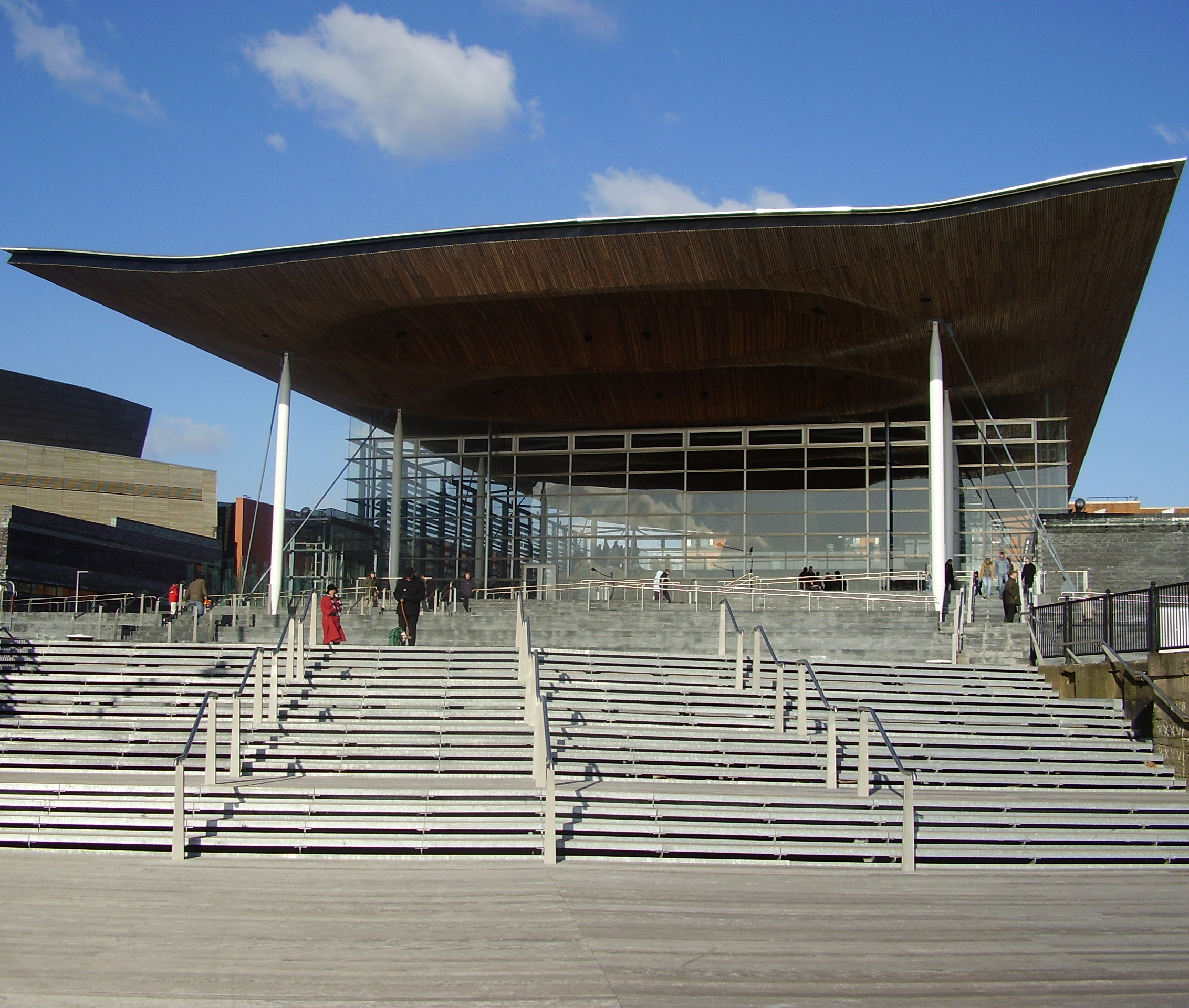
The steps leading up to the Senedd

Amidst this extra-curricular activity, Rogers continued to create controversial and iconic works. Perhaps the most famous of these, the Millennium Dome, was designed by the Rogers practice in conjunction with engineering firm Buro Happold and completed in 1999. It was the subject of fierce political and public debate over the cost and contents of the exhibition it contained; the building itself cost £43 million.

In May 2006, Rogers's practice was chosen as the architect of Tower 3 of the new World Trade Center in New York City, replacing the old World Trade Center which was destroyed in the September 11 attacks.

Rogers resigned his directorship of Rogers Stirk Harbour + Partners on 30 June 2020. The Rogers name was removed from the practice by 2022 as was required by the founding constitution, however the practice was renamed RSHP in June 2022, retaining Rogers's initial.

== Selected projects ==
=== Team 4 ===
- Creek Vean, Cornwall, UK (1963–1966)
- Reliance Controls electronics factory, Swindon, UK (1967)
- Jaffe House (also known as Skybreak House), Humphrey Spender's house, Radlett, Hertfordshire, UK (1965–1966)
- Wates Housing, Coulsdon, Surrey, UK (1965)
- Murray Mews, Camden, London, UK (1966)

=== Richard and Su Rogers Architects (with John Young and Laurie Abbott) ===
- 22 Parkside (Dr. Nino and Dada Rogers's house), Wimbledon, London, UK (1967)
- Zip-Up House (1967–69)
- The Studio, Ulting, Maldon, Essex, UK (1968–1969)

=== Piano + Rogers ===
- Universal Oil Products, Tadworth, UK (1969–1974)
- B&B Italia headquarters, Como, Italy (1972–1973)
- Pompidou Centre, Paris, France (1971–77)
- IRCAM, Paris, France (1971–1977)
- PA Consulting Group's Research Laboratory, Melbourn, UK (1976–1983)

=== The Richard Rogers Partnership ===
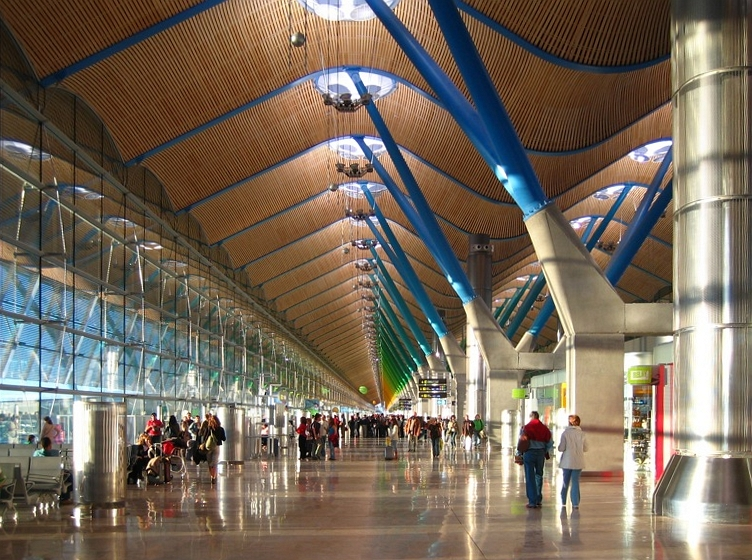
Madrid-Barajas Airport terminal 4

- Lloyd's building, London, UK (1978–84)
- Inmos microprocessor factory, Newport, Wales, UK (1980–1982)
- Old Billingsgate Market, London, UK (1985–1988)
- Paternoster Square, London, UK (1987)
- The River Café, London, UK (1987)
- Reuters Data Centre, London, UK (1987–1992)
- Kabuki-cho Tower, Tokyo, Japan (1987–1993)
- Linn Products, Waterfoot, Glasgow (1988)
- Antwerp Law Courts, Belgium (2000–2006)
- Marseille Provence Airport, Marignane, France (1989–1992)
- Channel 4 Headquarters, London, UK (1990–1994)
- European Court of Human Rights building, Strasbourg, France, 1995
- 88 Wood Street, London, UK (1990–1999)
- Palais de Justice de Bordeaux, Bordeaux, France (1993–1999)
- Lloyd's Register building, London, UK (1995–1999)
- Millennium Dome, London, UK (1996–1999)
- Broadwick House, London, UK (1996–2000)
- Paddington Waterside, London, UK (1999–2004)
- Mossbourne Community Academy, London, UK (2002–2004)
- Senedd building, Cardiff, Wales (1999–2005)
- Adolfo Suárez-Madrid Barajas Airport terminals 4 and 4S, Madrid, Spain (2004)
- Hesperia Tower, Barcelona, Spain (2005)

=== RSHP (previously Rogers Stirk Harbour + Partners) ===
- Heathrow Terminal 5, London, UK (1989–2008)
- Las Arenas, Barcelona, Spain (1999–2011)
- Maggie's Centre, London, UK (2001–2008)
- Central Park Station (R9), Kaohsiung Mass Rapid Transit system, Kaohsiung City, Taiwan (2003–2007)
- Three World Trade Center, New York City (2006–2018)
- British Museum, World Conservation and Exhibitions Centre, London, UK (2007–2014)
- One Hyde Park, London (2007–2010)
- Atrio Towers, Bogotá (2008–)
- Santa Maria del Pianto Underground Station, Naples, Italy (2006–)
- NEO Bankside, London, UK (2012)
- 33 Park Row, New York, USA (2021)
- 122 Leadenhall Street, also known as the Cheesegrater, London (2000–2014)
- Greater Paris / Grand Paris, France (2008–2013)
- Oxley Woods, Milton Keynes, UK (2004–2010)
- St. Lawrence Market North Revitalization, Toronto, Canada (2010–) with Adamson Associates
- Y:Cube, London (2013–2015)
- Stratford Cross, London (2014-ongoing)
- Taoyuan International Airport T3, Taipei, Taiwan (2015-ongoing)
- International Towers Sydney, Barangaroo, Sydney (2010–2016)
- 8 Chifley, Sydney, Australia (2005–2013)
- PLACE / Ladywell, London, UK (2014–2016)
- Parc1 Tower, Seoul, South Korea (2008–2020)
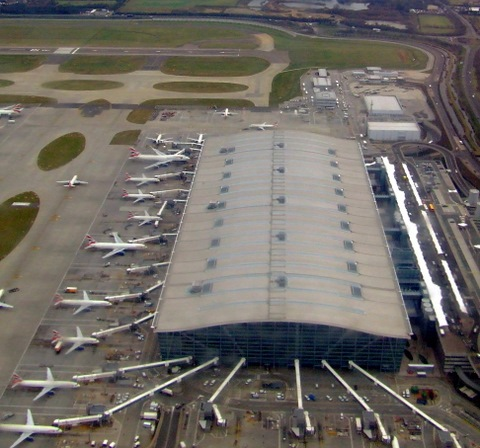
London Heathrow Terminal 5

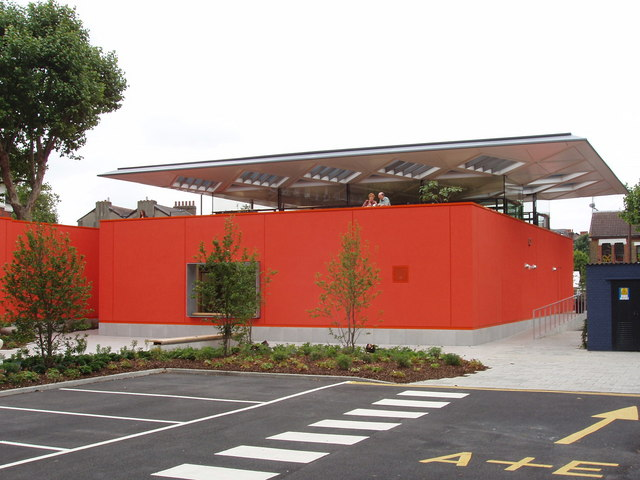
Maggie's Centre, London

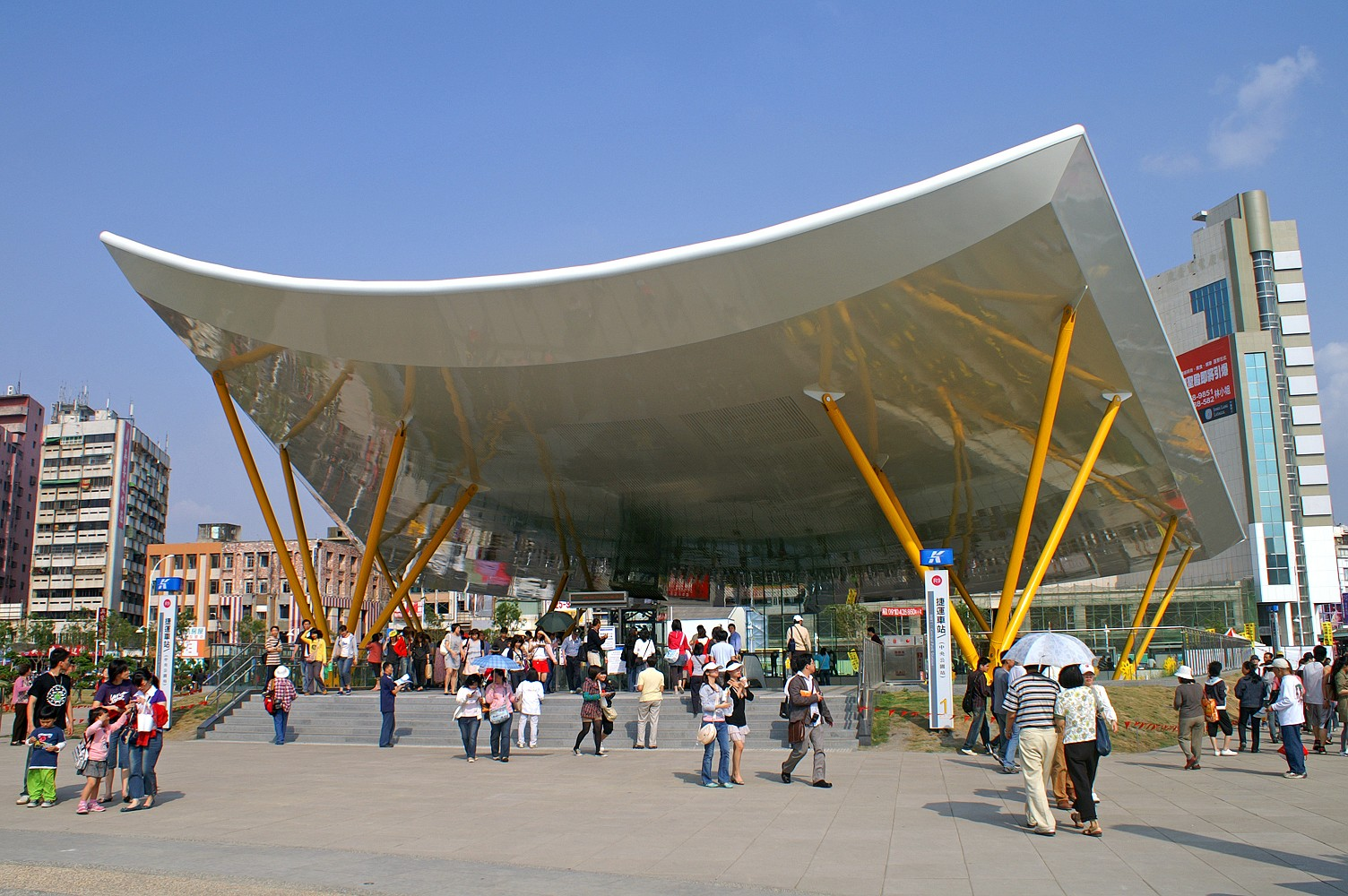
Central Park Station (R9), Kaohsiung City, Taiwan.

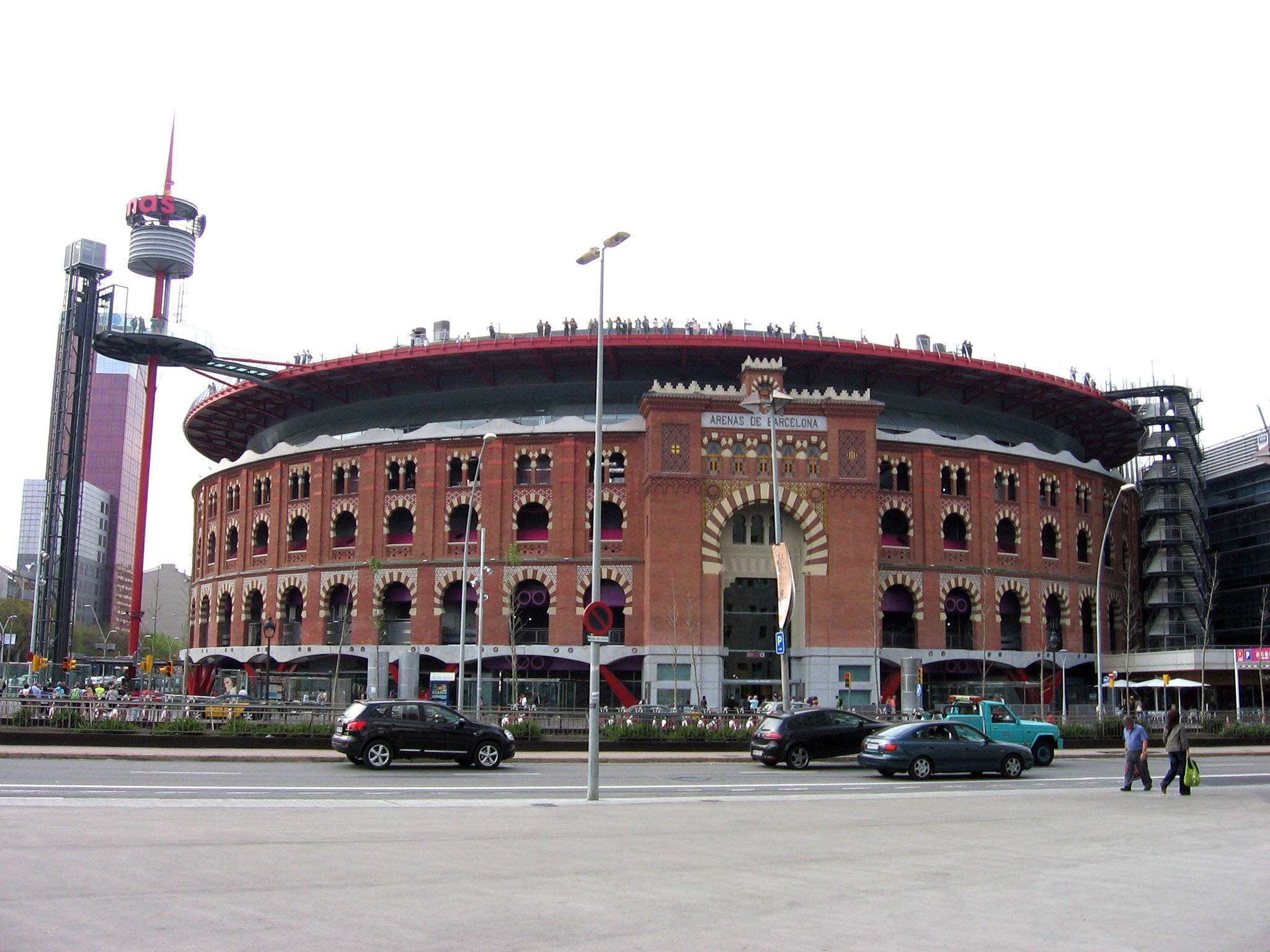
Las Arenas, Barcelona

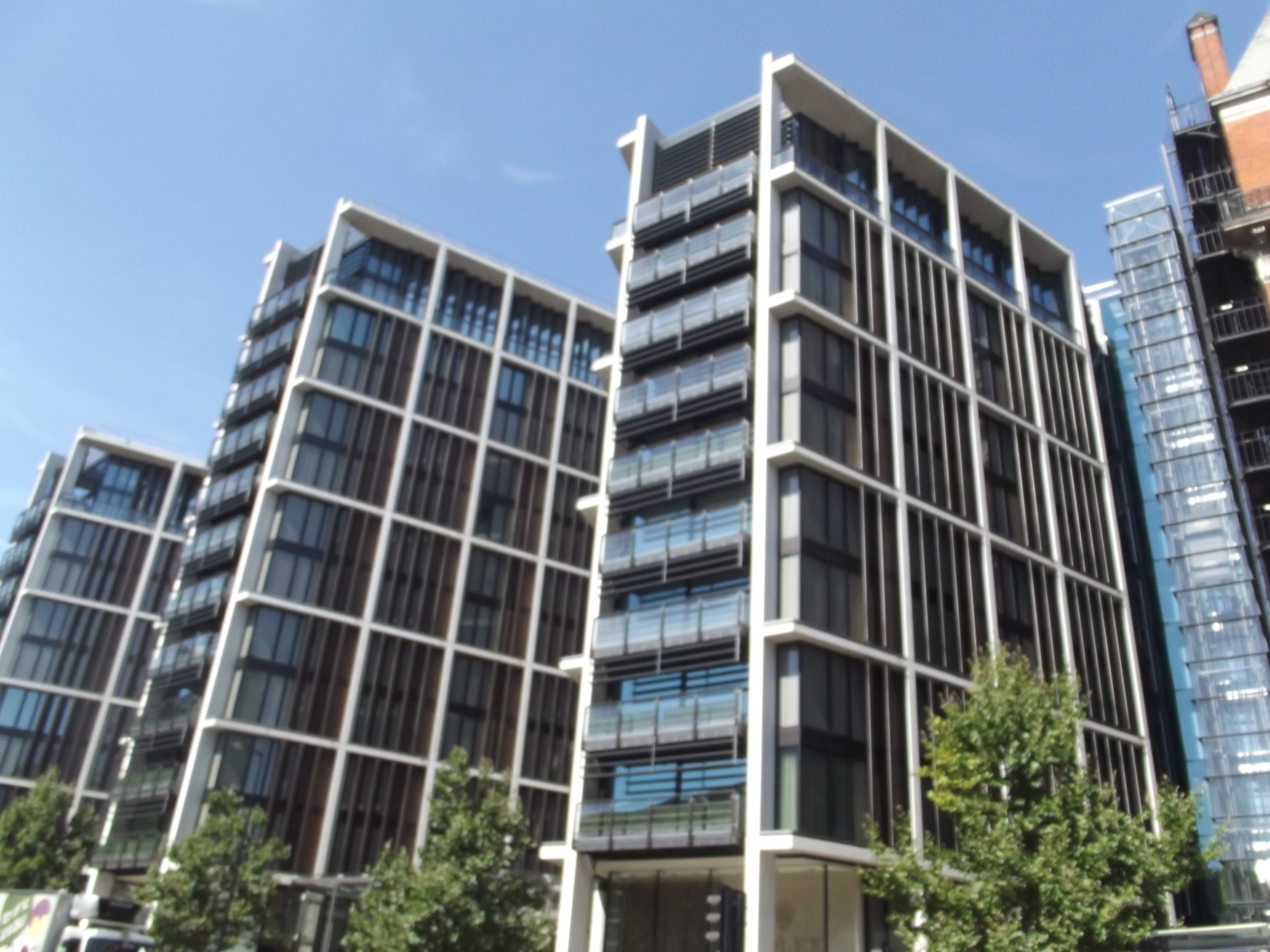
One Hyde Park, London

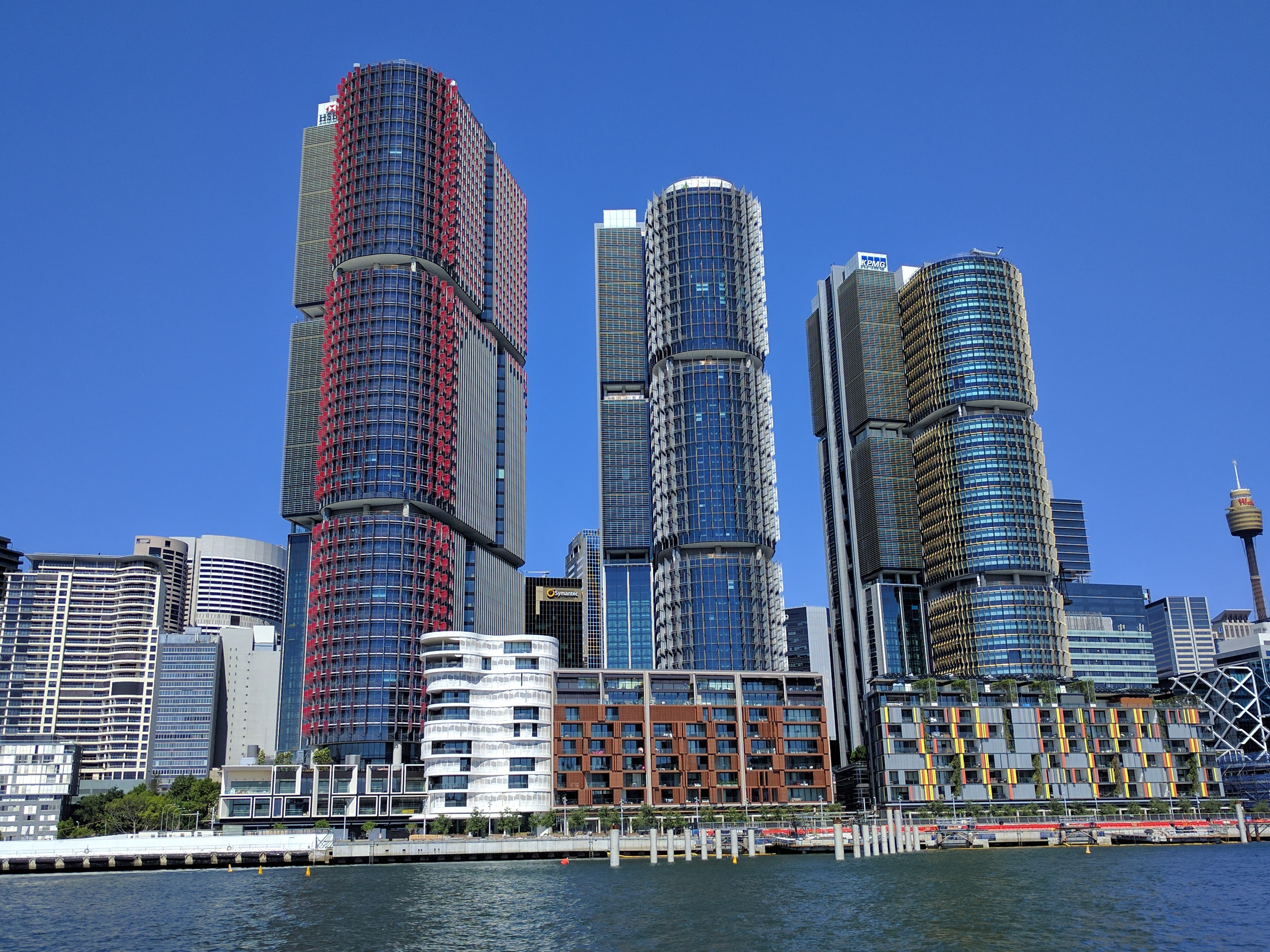
International Towers Sydney

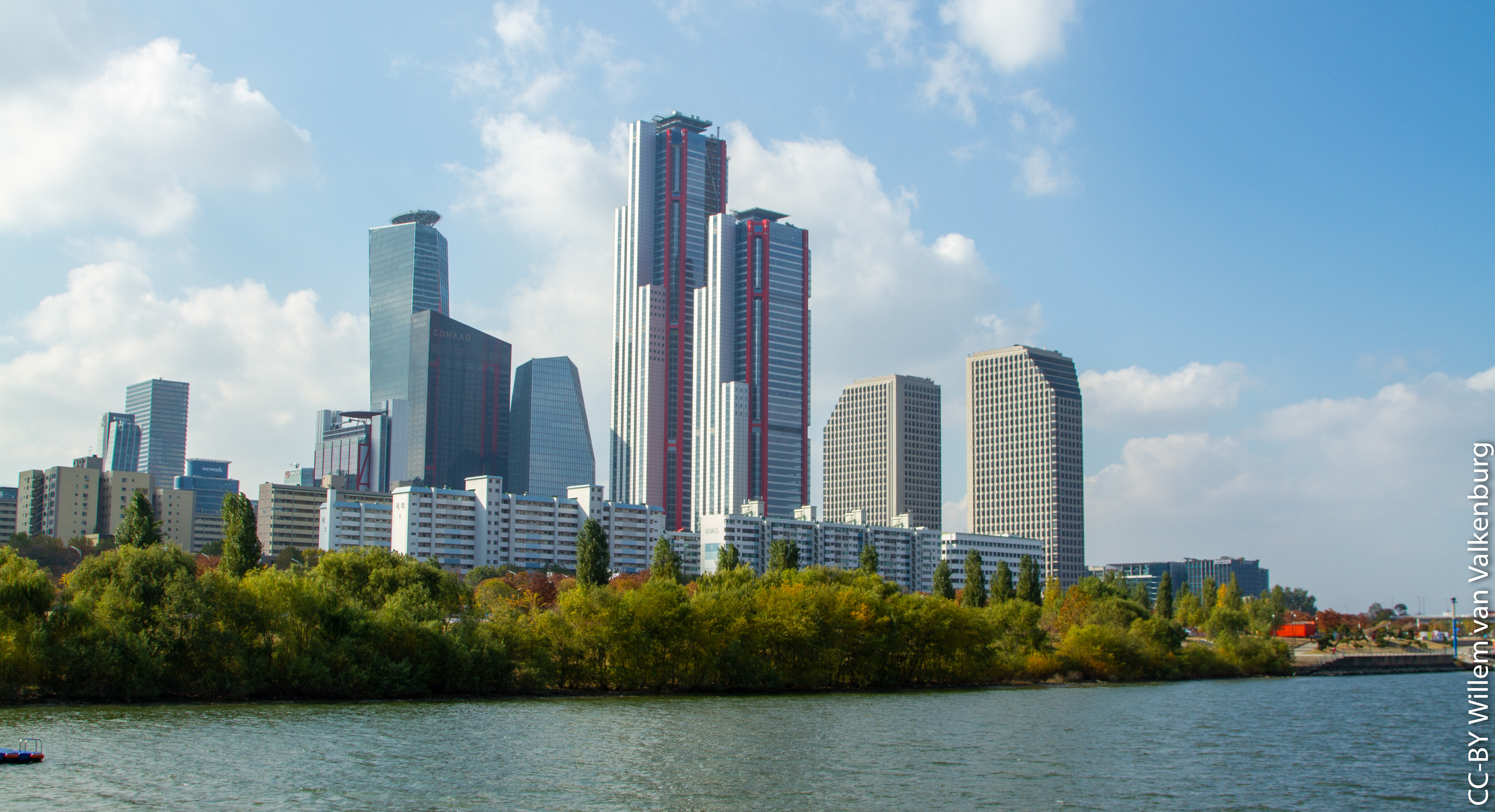
Parc1 Tower, Seoul

== Criticisms ==
Like Frank Lloyd Wright's and Le Corbusier's, some of Rogers's buildings have had problems resulting from their design. The Lloyds Buildings's much-vaunted design innovation of routing the service pipes outside the walls led to such costs related to weathering and maintenance that Lloyds considered vacating the building in 2014. Lloyds's former chief executive Richard Ward stated: "There is a fundamental problem with this building. Everything is exposed to the elements, and that makes it very costly."

In 2014 Rogers faced a £5 million legal claim over problems at the Oxley Woods estate designed by the firm. Residents complained of water seepage through cladding panels and windows on the prefabricated terraced housing.

== Palestine controversy ==
In February 2006, Rogers hosted the inaugural meeting of the campaigning organisation Architects and Planners for Justice in Palestine (APJP) in his London offices. At that time his practice had secured a number of projects in New York, including the redevelopment of the Silvercup Studios site, a masterplan for the East River Waterfront and a commission for a $1.7 billion expansion of the Jacob K. Javits Convention Centre in Manhattan. Rogers, however, publicly dissociated himself from the group within weeks, following an outcry from generally pro-Israel New York politicians, which threatened him with the loss of prestigious commissions including projects in New York and abroad. He announced his withdrawal with the statement, "I unequivocally renounce Architects and Planners for Justice in Palestine and have withdrawn my relationship with them."

== Personal life ==
Rogers was married to Ruth Rogers, chef and owner of The River Café restaurant in west London. They had two sons together, Roo and Bo (deceased 2011). Rogers also had three sons, Ben, Zad and Ab, from his first marriage to Su Brumwell. He had fourteen grandchildren and a younger brother, Peter William Rogers, a property developer and co-founder of Stanhope. In 2015, he was named one of the "50 best-dressed British men" by GQ magazine.

He died in London on 18 December 2021, at the age of 88.

== Honours and awards ==
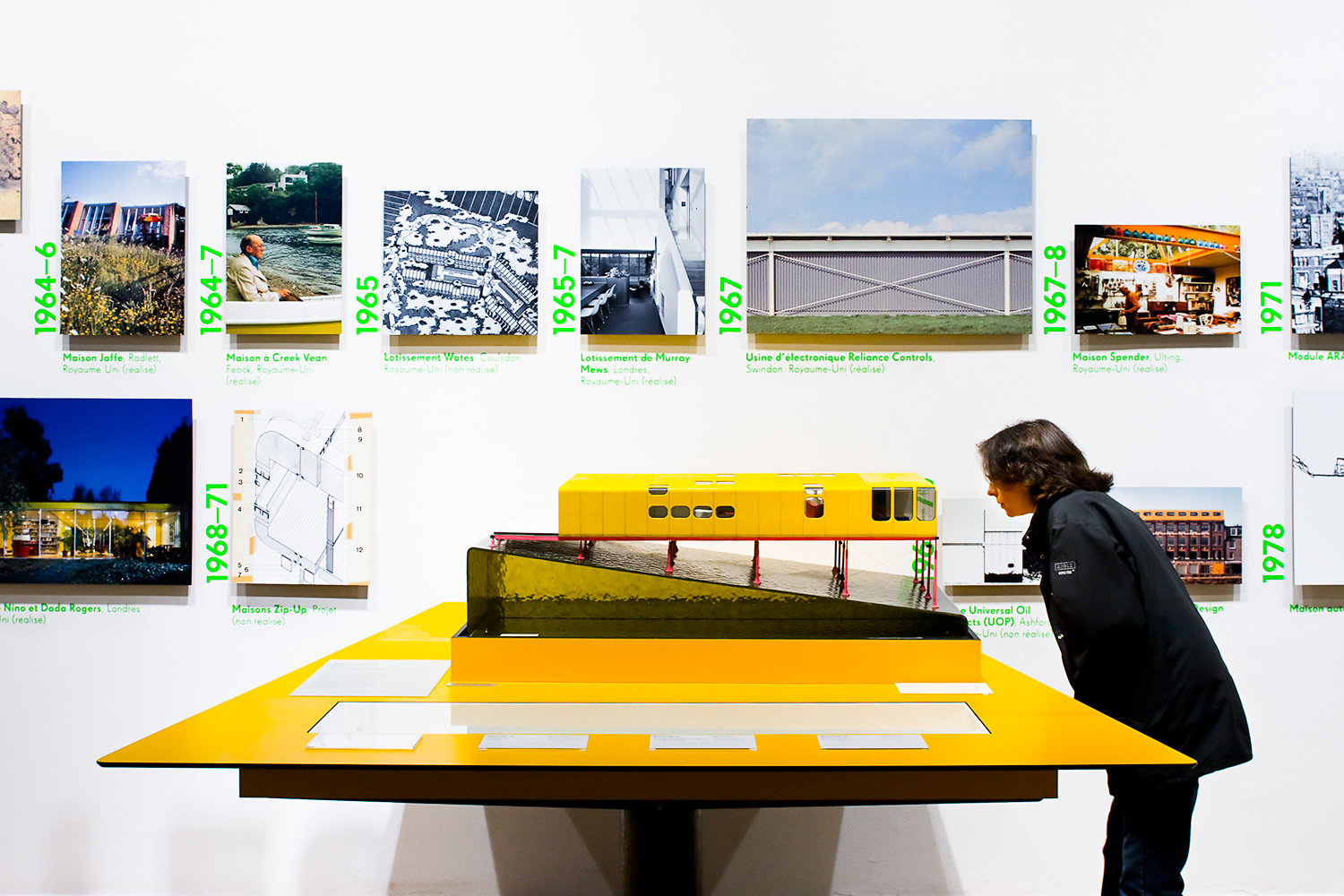
Exhibition on Richard Rogers at the Centre Beaubourg in Paris (2008). Zip Up House model.

Rogers was knighted by Queen Elizabeth II in the 1991 Birthday Honours for services to architecture. He was created Baron Rogers of Riverside, of Chelsea in the Royal Borough of Kensington and Chelsea on 17 October 1996. He sat as a Labour peer in the House of Lords; having not attended a proceeding in the 2019–21 session, his membership of the House of Lords expired on 11 May 2021. Rogers was appointed a Member of the Order of the Companions of Honour (CH) in the 2008 Birthday Honours list for services to architecture. However, he was a republican.

Rogers was awarded the RIBA Royal Gold Medal in 1985. He was twice honoured by France, first as a Chevalier, L'Ordre National de la Légion d'honneur in 1986, and later as an Officier de l'Ordre des Arts et des Lettres in 1995. He received a Golden Lion for Lifetime Achievement at the 10th Mostra di Architettura di Venezia. In 2006, the Richard Rogers Partnership was awarded the Stirling Prize for Terminal 4 of Barajas Airport, and again in 2009 for Maggie's Centre in London. Rogers won the Gold Medal for Architecture at the National Eisteddfod of Wales of 2006 for his work on the Senedd building of the Senedd (Welsh Parliament). He was also appointed an Honorary Fellow of the Royal Academy of Engineering in 2005. In 2007 Rogers was made Laureate of the Pritzker Architecture Prize – architecture's highest honour. He was awarded the Minerva Medal by the Chartered Society of Designers in the same year. In 2012, Rogers was among the British cultural icons selected by artist Sir Peter Blake to appear in a new version of his most famous artwork – the Beatles' Sgt. Pepper's Lonely Hearts Club Band album cover – to celebrate the British cultural figures of the last six decades.

Rogers was awarded honorary degrees from several universities, including Alfonso X El Sabio University in Madrid, Oxford Brookes University, the University of Kent, the Czech Technical University in Prague and the Open University. In 1994, he was awarded an Honorary Degree (Doctor of Science) by the University of Bath.

== In popular culture ==
Rogers is mentioned (along with fellow architect Philip Johnson) in the song "Thru These Architect's Eyes" on the album Outside (1995) by David Bowie.

Rogers is mentioned in the song "Anti-Everything" by British band Mansun, from the album Six (1998).

== Publications ==
Rogers wrote several books during his career, including:

- Architecture: A Modern View, Thames & Hudson (1991) ISBN 978-0-500-27651-8
- A New London (co-author Mark Fisher and the Labour Party), Penguin (1992) ISBN 978-0-14-015794-9
- Cities for a Small Planet, Faber and Faber (1997) ISBN 978-0-571-17993-0
- Towards an Urban Renaissance, Urban Task Force (1999) ISBN 978-1-85112-165-6
- Cities for a Small Country, Faber and Faber (2000) ISBN 978-0-571-20652-0
- Richard Rogers and Architects: From the House to the City, Fiell Publishing (2010) ISBN 978-1-906863-11-1
- Architecture: A Modern View, Thames & Hudson (2013) ISBN 978-0-500-34293-0
