= Theo Randall =

English chef (born 1967)

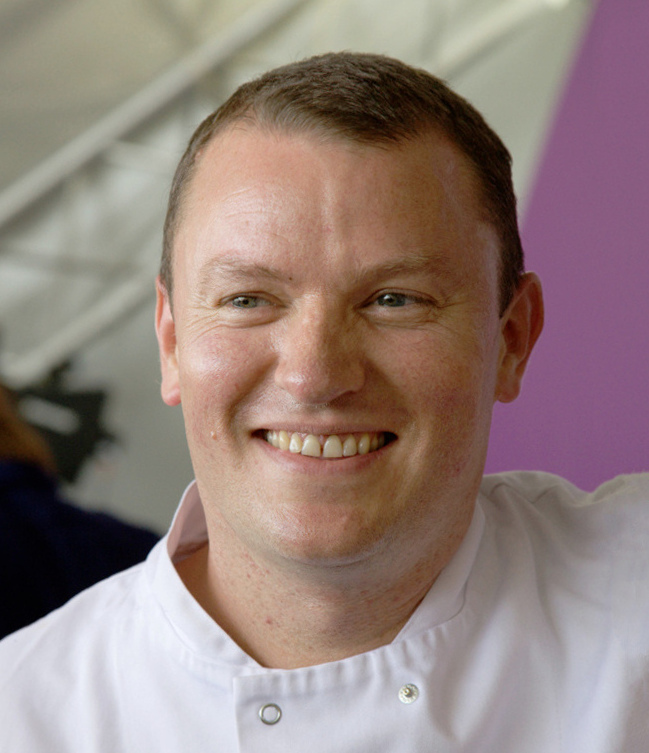
- Randall in 2009
- Born: 1967 (age 58–59); Kingston upon Thames, London, England
- Culinary career
- Rating: Michelin stars
- Current restaurant: Theo Randall at the InterContinental Hotel
- Previous restaurant: The River Café
- Website: theorandall.com

Theo Randall (born 1967) is an English chef who specialises in Italian cuisine. He is the proprietor of Theo Randall at the InterContinental Hotel London Park Lane, although he is perhaps best known for being awarded a Michelin star at The River Café in London.

== Career ==
Randall's career began at Chez Max in Surbiton, London, where he trained in classical cooking for four years. He joined the team at The River Café in 1989. After a year he moved to California to work at Chez Panisse under chef Alice Waters for 12 months. He then returned to the UK where he spent fifteen years, ten of which were as Head Chef and silent partner back at The River Café where he gained his Michelin star. Randall has been called the "unsung hero" of the restaurant, and has been credited with creating The River Café's signature dishes and making it an establishment that "changed Britain's restaurant culture for good".

He left The River Café to set up his own restaurant when a space became available at the InterContinental London. Theo Randall at the InterContinental London opened in February 2007 as part of a £60 million refurbishment of the hotel. In an interview he stated that he felt the need to prove to himself that he could do it. The new venture went on to be named "Italian Restaurant of the Year" at the London Restaurant Awards after it had been open for two years.

He collaborated with Pizza Express and created four pizzas for their autumn 2008 menu. It was the first time the chain had collaborated with a celebrity chef. Randall has also attended food festivals, including Taste of London held in Regent's Park, and has been involved in the London Restaurant Festival. On television, he has frequently appeared on BBC One's Saturday Kitchen.

In 2010, Randall started working with ASK Italian restaurants as their "expert friend", developing menus and coming up with new dishes. In June 2015, he became an investor in the Azzurri Group, which owns and runs the restaurant chain.

In 2015 he partnered with Gousto to bring them recipes from his latest book.

== Early and personal life ==
Randall was born in Kingston upon Thames in 1967. He is married to Natalie, and they have two children. They have lived in the Chalk Farm area of London since 2001 in a house that was built in the 1850s.

== Bibliography ==
- Pasta (2010)
- The ASK Italian Cookbook (2012)
- My Simple Italian (2015)
- The Italian Deli Cookbook (2022)
- The Italian Pantry (2022)
- Verdura: 10 Vegetables, 100 Italian Recipes (2024)
