= Towards an Urban Renaissance =

1999 UK government urban planning report

Cover of Towards an Urban Renaissance

Towards an Urban Renaissance was report by the United Kingdom's Urban Task Force, published by the Department of the Environment, Transport and the Regions on 29 June 1999. The report contained 105 recommendations for improving towns and cities in England. The Urban Task Force was chaired by Lord Rogers of Riverside.

It examined the question of how 4 million projected new homes over 25 years might be accommodated in the UK without further encroachment into the green belt or other areas of countryside.

== Background ==
The review leading to the published report was commissioned by the then Deputy Prime Minister John Prescott in 1998, to identify the causes of urban decline and establish a vision for Britain's cities based on the principles of design excellence, social well-being and environmental responsibility. Participants included Peter Hall.

== Key recommendations ==
- Design-led urban regeneration process and the designation of special urban policy areas.
- Reform of the planning system and involvement of local people in decision making and neighbourhood level.
- The building of 60% of new housing as schemes on brownfield land.
- Better use of existing housing stock.
- The relaxation of Local Planning Authority's standards relating to density and separation distances between dwellings
- The better integration of housing with highways (relaxation of parking standards and designing the roads around the housing rather than the housing around the roads).
- Improve non-car transport.
- Better quality design.

== Outcomes ==
Towards an Urban Renaissance resulted in the White Paper Our Towns and Cities – the Future, published in 2000. It was also influential in the revised Planning policy guidance note 3: Housing (PPG 3), also published in 2000. Rogers published an independent update titled Towards a Strong Urban Renaissance in 2005.
