= Bowellism =

Modern architectural style associated with Richard Rogers

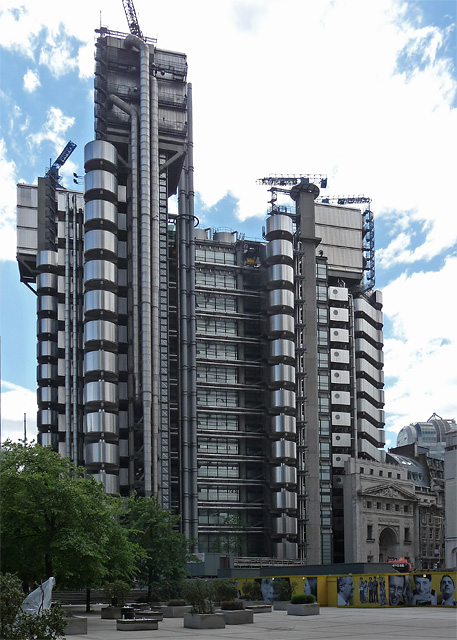
Lloyd's building, London

Bowellism is a modern architectural style heavily associated with Richard Rogers. It is described as a transient architectural and flippant style that was influenced by Le Corbusier and Antoni Gaudí. The style consists of services for the building, such as ducts, sewage pipes, and lifts, being located on the exterior to maximise space in the interior.

== Origin ==
The style originated with Michael Webb's 1957 student project for a Furniture Manufacturers Association building in High Wycombe. Webb coined the term in response to a comment on his design by Sir Nikolaus Pevsner in a 1961 lecture, in which he recalled hearing the words: "within the schools there are some disturbing trends; I saw the other day a design for a building that looked like a series of stomachs sitting on a plate. Or bowels, connected by bits of gristle". Thus this inside-out style was termed 'Bowellism' because of how it recalled the way the human body works. One of Webb's proposed structures based on bowellism was the Sin Centre for Leicester Square. The concept was a geodesic structure that supports a glass skin.

Some scholars cite Reyner Banham as the first to use bowellism for the new architectural fascination with visible circulation, one that focuses on a building's skeletal services as well as its "bloodstream" or the moving cars and crowd, cascading down from the top to the main foyers—all visible through the structure's geodesic skin. Banham is also credited for introducing the term "topological" to refer to an aspect of brutalism.

The Pompidou Centre, Paris

Richard Rogers and Renzo Piano continued the style with the design of the Pompidou Centre in Paris, described as a "vast exercise in Bowellism", so the floor space of the interior could be maximised to fully appreciate the exhibitions.

== Examples ==
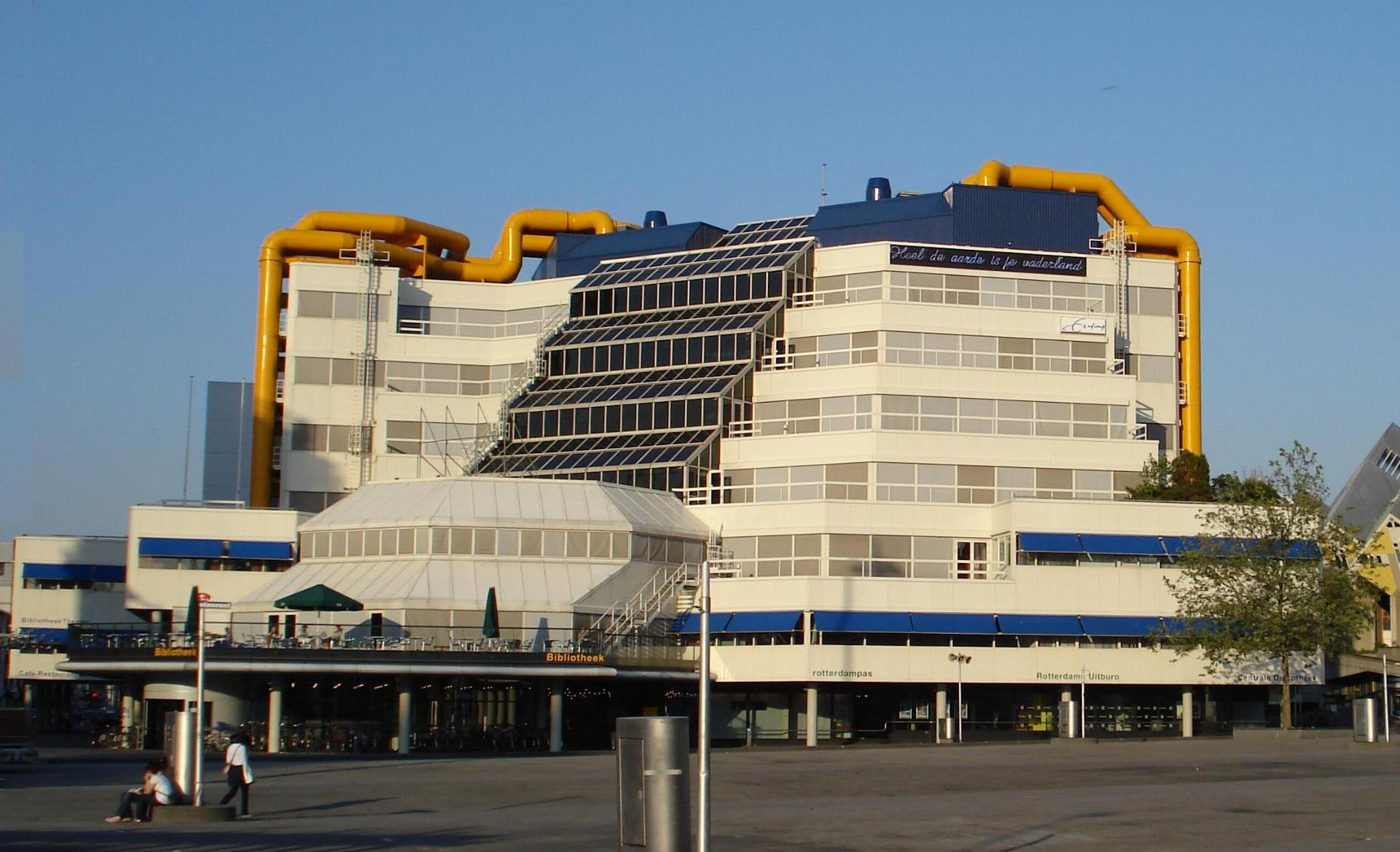
Rotterdam Library, Rotterdam

- The Pompidou Centre in Paris (1977) by Richard Rogers and Renzo Piano.
- The Central Library of Rotterdam (1983) by Jaap Bakema.
- The Uniklinikum Aachen (1985) by Weber & Brand.
- The Lloyd's building in London (1986) by Richard Rogers.
- The Channel 4 headquarters at 124 Horseferry Road, London (1994), by Richard Rogers.
- Westminster tube station (1999) by Michael Hopkins & Partners

== See also ==
- High-tech architecture
  - British high-tech architecture
