= British high-tech architecture =

Form of high-tech architecture

British high-tech architecture is a form of high-tech architecture, also known as structural expressionism, a type of late modern architectural style that emerged in the 1970s, incorporating elements of high tech industry and technology into building design. High-tech architecture grew from the modernist style, using new advances in technology and building materials.

== Clarification ==
British high-tech architecture is a term applied principally to the work of a group of London-based architects, British High-Tech Architects, who, by following the teachings of the Architectural Association's futuristic programmes, created an architectural style best characterised by cultural and design ideals of: component-based, light weight, easily transportable, factory-finished using standardised interchangeable highly engineered parts, fun, popular and spontaneous Pop-up buildings.

Within the Architectural Association were a number of overlapping spheres of influence – the most notable being Archigram, a loosely arranged group including Peter Cook (responsible for Plug-in City and Instant City), Mike Webb (Sin Centre) and Ron Herron (Walking City). Alongside Archigram were the mechanistic schemes of Cedric Price, who, with engineer Frank Newby, designed a number of unbuilt projects, most notably Fun Palace, a community theatre to the brief of Joan Littlewood, and Potteries Think-belt, a scheme which would re-use decommissioned railway routes to create a university on wheels. Price also promoted the idea of architecture having a fourth dimension: Time. In addition to the aforementioned was the Independent Group (art movement), which influenced the British side of the pop art movement, through architectural luminaries Peter Smithson a Head of the Architectural Association and Colin St John Wilson.

The British high-tech movement remained in the ascendency from the 1960s until 1984, when an intervention by HRH Charles Prince of Wales over a competition-winning design by ABK Architects (previously Ahrends, Burton and Koralek) for an extension to the National Gallery in London signalled an end to High Tech architecture in the UK. More, from that date, the group of leading proponents of British High Tech architecture distanced themselves from the High Tech style to endear themselves to sponsors. By such action, they would continue to design buildings of national and international significance. In satisfying the demands of conservative clients, planners, conservationists and funding organisations, the essence of High Tech was lost.

This article, British high-tech architecture, traces the development of technological advances and industrial innovations that went hand-in-hand with the emergence of the High Tech style, and without which British high-tech architecture would have remained where it started – as the pop art imagery of Archigram, the most influential of the Architectural Association visionary groups.

== Background ==
The history of light-weight, mass-produced, component-based dry construction, which, as a means of assembly differentiates system building from traditional building methods, dates back to the 19th C. It started in the UK with Sir Joseph Paxton's newly created building methods at Chatsworth House's conservatory completed in 1840, and later at The Great Exhibition of 1851, when he used steam-powered woodworking machines to manufacture batches of identical components. At the same time (1829), Henry Robinson Palmer patented corrugated iron, using his invention to construct a shed roof for the London Dock Company the following year.

Progress continued in another industry entirely, the lattice framed trusses required for airships developed by Barnes Wallis at Howden, Yorkshire during his work in the 1920s on the R100 Airship resulted in the development of lightweight tubes made from spiral-wound duralumin strip in a helical fashion.

Later, solutions to housing shortage and replacement of other war-decimated facilities required fresh thinking about factory rather than site based building, such as the post-war building of Arcon prefabs in the United Kingdom in large numbers, and of system-built schools such as Consortium of Local Authorities Special Programme CLASP, filtered through to building design in the form of High Tech System Building. Generally, it has been an engineering innovation that has given rise to architectural opportunity.

Between 1961 and 1967 in California, the SCSD (School Construction Systems Development ) project offered architects and educationalists more options than had been available previously - providing greater column-free floor space by using longer spans, and flexible room layouts below. A deep structural zone into which power, H&V, lighting and concertina partition tracks could be accommodated reduced the need for the rigid restrictive planning grids that had hampered the earlier systems.

Further innovations: space frame roof structures derived from WWII aircraft hangar roofs, Rectangular Hollow Section (RHS) (to include Square Hollow Section) steel, known in the US as Hollow Structural Section (HSS) developed in the UK by Stewarts & Lloyds Ltd in the late 1950s and early 1960s, and advances in 'Patent Glazing' during the same period of time, which allowed greater freedom in both wall and roof glazing – presented architects and their clients with near-unlimited flexibility in a building's planning, layout of accommodation and use patterns.

The trend for light weight dry construction also had its roots in military fast-response use, when administration, storage or workshop buildings might be required at short notice. The Nissen hut from WWI, and later the Quonset hut (a derivative of the Nissen design) developed during WWII were both produced in large quantities. However, notwithstanding its origins for military use, light weight design principles were seized upon by American architect and philosopher Richard Buckminster Fuller, who advocated the use of slender or tensile structural components as they would be less wasteful of Earth's scarce resources than would be their bulkier traditional counterparts. His message became something of a creed for the generation of High tech architects. Fuller's designs used well-engineered batch produced components in designs for his renowned Geodesic Domes, although the term 'geodesic' is attributed to Barnes Wallis in his fuselage design for the WWII Lancaster bomber aircraft. German-born Konrad Wachsmann also taught the principles of this type of component-based building design at USC School of Architecture-SAFA.

== Proponents of British high-tech architecture ==
Most architects associated with British high-tech emerged from the Architectural Association; others worked in London at the offices of those that had. Some, like-minded, had come through the offices of modernists such as Ove Arup and Felix Samuely, who believed in 'total design' an earlier term for 'multi-disciplinary' design. In addition, a small group of sympathetic structural engineers, including Frank Newby, Anthony Hunt, Ted Happold, Mark Whitby and Peter Rice, became essential to the development of the movement. As a result of the symbiotic association between architects and engineers, a freedom of design evolved away from the constraints of the everyday. Aside from the architectural and engineering impetus, there was a wider cultural involvement as the principal proponents shared friendships centred upon art, writing and industrial design. Most operated as freelancers working in small studio home offices which became their calling-cards identifying with the High Tech style.

- Michael Aukett (1938-2020)
- Reyner Banham (1922-1988) Writer and critic
- John Batchelor (illustrator) (1936–2019) Technical Illustrator – aircraft and other – Subjects include work by Foster
- Misha Black (1910–1977) Contributor to patronage of 1951 Festival of Britain and to Design Research Unit (DRU)
- Hugh Broughton (architect) (b. 1965) Formed Hugh Broughton Architects in 1995
- Cuno Brullmann (b. 1945) Worked in association with Piano + Rogers and Ove Arup and Partners
- Marcus Brumwell (1901–1977), a founder of Design Research Unit (DRU)
- Richard Buckminster Fuller (1895–1983)
- Hugh Casson (1910–1999) Director of Architecture for the 1951 Festival of Britain
- Warren Chalk (1927–1988) Founding member of Archigram
- Peter Cook (architect) (b. 1936) founding member of Archigram
- Dennis Crompton (b. 1935) founding member and archivist of Archigram
- Charles and Ray Eames (1907–1978, 1912–1988)
- Ezra Ehrenkrantz (1932–2001) architect of the SCSD (School Construction Systems Development) project
- Norman Foster (b. 1935) co-founder (1963) of Team 4
- Wendy Foster (1937–1989) co-founder (1963) of Team 4
- David Greene (architect) (b. 1937) Founding member of Archigram
- Nicholas Grimshaw (b. 1939) Grimshaw Architects founded in 1980
- Fritz Haller USM Modular Furniture
- Ted Happold (1930–1996) Founded Buro Happold in 1976
- Ron Herron (1930–1994) Founding member of Archigram
- Andrew Holmes (b. 1947)
- Michael Hopkins (architect) (1935-2023) Former partner at Foster Associates, set up Michael Hopkins Architects in 1976
- Patty Hopkins (b. 1942) Cofounder of Michael Hopkins Architects in 1976, completed Hopkins House, Hampstead in the same year
- Richard Horden (1944–2018)
- John Howard (architect)
- Anthony Hunt (1932-2022) Formed Anthony Hunt Associates in 1962
- Ben Johnson (artist) (b. 1946) Subjects include architectural works by Foster and Rogers
- Jan Kaplický (1937–2009) Drawings of Neo futuristic Architecture
- Ian Liddell (b. 1938)
- Syd Mead (1933–2019) Artist specialising in Neo futuristic imagery – subjects include concept work for1982 movie Blade Runner
- Max Mengeringenhausen, Founder (1948) of Mero Structures now named Mero-Schmidlin
- John Miller (b. c1930) Formed partnership with Alan Colquhoun in 1961
- Hidalgo Moya (1920–1994) Formed partnership with Philip Powell (architect) in 1948
- Edric Neel (1914–1952) Through Arcon sought better links between architects and industry
- Brendan Neiland (artist) (b. 1941) Subjects include architectural works by Grimshaw and Rogers
- Frank Newby (1926–2001)
- Constant Nieuwenhuys (1920–2005)
- David Nixon (architect) (b. 1947) Future Systems 1979 founded by Kaplický and Nixon while working at Foster Associates
- Frei Otto (1925-2015)
- Renzo Piano (b.1937) Formed partnership Piano + Rogers in 1971
- Jean Prouvé (1901-1984)
- Cedric Price (1934–2003) "Unconventional and visionary architect best-known for buildings which never saw the light of day"
- Peter Rice (1935–1992) Joined Ove Arup & Partners in 1956
- Ian Ritchie (architect) (b. 1947) Worked for Foster Associates and with Hopkins/Hunt on SSSALU (short span structures in aluminium)
- Richard Rogers (1933–2021) Co-founder (1963) of Team 4 Partnership with Piano before founding Richard Rogers
- Su Rogers (b. 1939) Co-founder (1963) of Team 4 Partner in Miller & Colquhoun Architects later John Miller & Partners
- Walter Segal (1907–1985) Pioneer of self-build housing to the Segal self-build method
- Rod Sheard (b. 1951) In 1998 Sheard's firm LOBB Sports Architecture (formerly Howard V Lobb & Partners) merged with HOK Sport.
- Alison and Peter Smithson (1928-1993) and (1923-2003) Pioneers of Industrial Aesthetic
- Basil Spence (1907-1976) Designer of bolt-together pavilion for Festival of Britain
- Colin Stansfield Smith (1932-2013) Hampshire County Architect and Patron
- Ralph Tubbs (1912–1996) Designer of bolt-together pavilion for Festival of Britain
- Konrad Wachsmann (1901–1980)
- Derek Walker (1929–2015) Architect and Patron for Milton Keynes Development Corporation
- Michael Webb (architect) (b. 1937) Co-founder of Archigram
- Mark Whitby (b. 1950) Worked, early in his career, for Anthony Hunt Associates and Buro Happold
- John Winter (architect) (1930–2012) Writer and critic
- Georgina Wolton (−2021)

Noteworthy architectural practices

- Powell & Moya (architectural practice formed 1948)
- Howard V Lobb & Partners (architectural practice formed 1950) merged with HOK (firm) (architectural practice founded 1955) renamed Populous (architectural practice renamed 2009)
- Building Design Partnership (BDP) (architectural practice founded 1961)
- Williamson Faulkner Brown (architectural practice) now named FaulknerBrowns Architects (architectural practice from 2013)
- Gillinson Barnett & Partners (architectural practice formed 1970) now named Barnett & Partners (architectural practice)

== Contemporary imagery ==
In the austere post World War II Britain, illustrations associated with the comic-book heroes, science fiction writing, aircraft and aerospace industries and military hardware such as the Bailey Bridge provided inspirational imagery for the British High Tech architects.

Furthermore, in 1951, the Festival of Britain intended to lift the spirits of the nation following the austerity of WWII, brought together under the architectural Directorship of Hugh Casson a group of leading architects and engineers to create a series of mainly temporary exhibition buildings located primarily on South Bank area of London.

Most of all in 1969, Apollo 11 and its Lunar Module pointed the way towards light weight exoskeletal transient structures free from conventional building limitations. Science Fiction images from Paolo Soleri, Georgii Krutikov, Buckminster Fuller, Robert McCall, Syd Mead, and, of significance, British author Arthur C. Clarke, (who in 1948 wrote the short story, first published in 1951, "Sentinel of Eternity", which was used as a starting point for the 1968 novel and film 2001: A Space Odyssey), provided a rich source of inspiration for the High Tech movement.

== High Tech Buildings for leisure ==
Wide span column-free dome, cuboid and pyramid-shaped building envelopes provided flexibility for internal layout and use patterns. Dutch architect Constant Nieuwenhuys in New Babylon, his work including drawings and writings of 1959–1974 (not yet called High Tech), foresaw a fictitious world in which the pursuit of pleasure and play, rather than work, had become the mainstay of everyday life for the élite of society.

UK Local Authorities in the 1970s, both at seaside locations and as a part of urban regeneration initiatives, sought to recreate the fun attractions of sun-bathing and swimming in artificially-created waves. Out-of-London UK architects Gillinson Barnett & Partners (Leeds), and Williamson Faulkner Brown Architects (Newcastle upon Tyne) were leaders in this form of design with schemes including Summerland in the Isle of Man (destroyed by fire two years after opening), Sun Centre Rhyl North Wales (now demolished), Oasis Leisure Centre Swindon, and Bletchley Leisure Centre in Milton Keynes (now demolished). Only the Oasis Leisure Centre remains as an example of this building type, although it is itself presently under threat of demolition.

== Industrial aesthetic ==
Factory-finished components, brought to site and bolted together, provided uniformity in appearance and standardisation which would allow components to be replaced or reconfigured. Typical of this design trend was the use of a Braithwaite water tank by the Smithsons in their designs for Hunstanton Secondary Modern School in Norfolk UK.

== Industrialisation ==
Industrial components, batch-produced in factories using newly invented materials or new manufacturing processes allowed the construction/assembly of High Tech buildings to move forward.

Milestones in technological advance
Description of Advancement	How, Why and Where	Importance to British High Tech Architecture
Mass-produced identical timber components	Chatsworth House conservatory UK Joseph Paxton 1836–40	First example of system building
Corrugate Iron patented	London Dock Company UK Henry Robinson Palmer 1840	Introduction of versatile standard-sized sheeting material
Nissen hut	Primarily for military use UK Major Peter Norman Nissen 1916	Easily transportable, could be erected rapidly, providing versatile buildings
Plywood sheets marketed	8 ft x 4 ft (2.4m x 1.2m) standard sized sheets manufactured USA 1928	Introduction of easily worked versatile standard-sized sheeting material for general use
Light weight space frame	R100 airship Howden, Yorkshire UK Barnes Wallis 1929	Light weight lattice beams to form space frame
Synthetic Rubber/Neoprene marketed	DuPont Company USA Trademark 1937	UV stable dry application weathering strips for glazing and panel jointing
Quonset hut	Based upon Nissen hut design, primarily for military use during WWII USA named after Quonset Point 1941	Easily transportable, could be erected rapidly, providing versatile buildings
Geodesic space frame design	Lancaster Bomber aircraft fuselage UK Barnes Wallis 1942	Geodesic design used later by Buckminster Fuller
Aluminium Patent Glazing bar	From WWII aircraft technology USA/UK/Germany	Light weight corrosion-resistant standardised glazing system
Large span space frame design	Atlas Aircraft Corporation USA Konrad Wachsmann Before end of WWII, Max Mengeringenhausen Mero Structures Germany 1948	Near-limitless options for planning and layout
Prefabricated Bungalow	Arcon UK Edric Neel, Ove Arup and others post WWII	Factory produced in large numbers dry bolt-together construction
Prefabricated House	Lustron house USA Carl Strandlund and others post WWII	Built from factory-made mass-produced enamelled steel components
Prefabricated House	Dymaxion house USA Richard Buckminster Fuller post WWII	Factory-made with fitted interior and 'oast house' ventilation
Case Study Houses California	Eames House Case Study 8 USA Charles Eames, Eero Saarinen 1945-1949	Manufacturers' catalogue sourced mass-produced steel components
Prefabricated house	Maison Tropicale prefabricated house France Jean Prouvé	Ultra light weight aluminium components suitable for air freight
Aluminium roof structure	Dome of Discovery Festival of Britain UK Ralph Freeman and others 1951	Fully systemised aluminium roof structure
Consortia-led School Building system	Hertfordshire Schools, CLASP*, SCOLA and others UK Charles Herbert Aslin and others 1955	Building systems with extensive instruction manuals *designed for use in areas of mining subsidence
Float glass marketed	Pilkington Glass company UK Alistair Pilkington 1952	Inexpensive viable alternative to polished plate glass
Prototyping and launch of RHS (in USA – HSS) steel tubes	Stewarts and Lloyds Ltd UK Clydesdale steel mill and others 1959	SHS and RHS widespread use
Pre-painted profiled sheet steel	British Steel Shotton Works UK late 1970s	Profiled, pre-finished steel cladding provided industrial aesthetic
Californian Schools System Building SCSD	SCSD (School Construction Systems Development) USA Ezra Ehrenkrantz 1961–67	Much copied vision of High Tech Building System
Development of Geodesic Domes	Geodesic Dome USA/Canada Buckminster Fuller 1967	Unlimited column-free space allowing flexibility of use
Pre-finished Glass Reinforced Plastic (GRP)	Pill Creek House Feock Cornwall Miller/Hunt UK late 1970s	Alternative light weight cladding provided industrial aesthetic
Development of Gridshells	Manheim Exhibition Frei Otto Germany 1974	Unlimited column-free space allowing flexibility of use
Composite primary structure	IBM Travelling Exhibition Renzo Piano/Ove Arup 1982–84 UK and other locations	Steel/wood/acrylic components in dry bolt-together construction

== Technology transfer ==
Using 'component-based, light weight, factory-finished using standardised interchangeable highly engineered parts' as a template for High Tech Building, in due course technologies developed in allied industries such as boatbuilding, vehicle manufacture or cold storage were transferred to British High Tech architecture.

Transfer of Technology
Technology type	Detail of transferred use	Example of subsequent use
Boatbuilding	Use of ocean yacht stainless steel rigging as structural cross-bracing	Michael Hopkins (architect)/Anthony Hunt Patera Building, Stoke-on-Trent UK 1982
Boatbuilding	Use of ocean yacht aluminium mast extrusions for primary structural elements	Richard Horden Horden House[16], Woodgreen Hampshire UK 1984
Cold Storage	Use of panels designed for refrigerated cold storage rooms	Richard Rogers Rogers Wimbledon House, London UK late 1960s
Vehicle manufacture	Use of vehicle body panel hydraulic presses to form building panels	Michael Hopkins/Anthony Hunt Patera Building, Stoke-on-Trent UK 1982
Vehicle manufacture	Use of synthetic rubber vehicle gaskets for weather-sealing	Foster Associates/Anthony Hunt Sainsbury Centre for Visual Arts, UEA Norwich UK 1978
Furniture manufacture	Use of scaled up furniture components for building use	Fritz Haller Stahlbausystem designed alongside USM Mobel-bausystem Switzerland from 1962
Early bi-plane aircraft design	Use of lightweight struts and tension cables	Patty Hopkins/Buro Happold Fleet Velmead School UK 1984–1986
Light-engineering	Use of die-cast alloy castings for structural components	Konrad Wachsmann hangar space frame node joints USA Atlas Aircraft Corporation before end of WWII
Heavy-engineering	Use of heavy-engineering steel sandbox castings for primary structure	Renzo Piano + Richard Rogers Pompidou Centre France 1977

== Selected works and projects ==
Selected Works and Projects
Works or Project	Date and Location	Architect/Engineer/Patron	Notability of work
Dome of Discovery	1951 London UK	Ralph Tubbs/Ralph Freeman/Festival of Britain	Exhibition building demolished 1952
Fun Palace	1961-65 Lea Valley East London UK	Cedric Price/Frank Newby/Joan Littlewood	Unbuilt
Reliance Controls	1966 Swindon UK	Team 4/Norman Foster/Anthony Hunt/Reliance Controls	Winner of the first Financial Times Industrial Architecture Award demolished 1991
Zip-Up House	1968	Richard and Su Rogers/Anthony Hunt/Dupont, for ‘The House of Today’	Unbuilt
22 Parkside	1968	Richard and Su Rogers/Anthony Hunt	Family home on the Zip-Up house model
Pillwood House	1973–1974 Feock Cornwall UK	John Miller/Su Rogers/Anthony Hunt/Marcus Brumwell	Grade II* listed holiday house
B&B Italia Offices	1973 Lombardy, Italy	Studio Piano & Rogers/F. Marano/B&B Italia	Headquarters Building light weight and extendable
Hopkins House, Hampstead	1976 London UK	Michael Hopkins Architects/Anthony Hunt/Michael and Patricia Hopkins	Grade II* listed ultra light weight family home and studio
UOP Fragrances Factory	1978 Tadworth Surrey UK	Piano + Rogers/Anthony Hunt Associates/Universal Oil Products	Purpose-built perfume laboratory and manufacturing site for Universal Oil Products Demolished 2021
SSSALU (short span structures in aluminium) building system with aluminium primary structure	1979	Michael Hopkins/Ian Ritchie/Anthony Hunt/High Duty Alloys Ltd (HDA)	Unbuilt
Brewery Racking Plant	1980 Bury St Edmunds UK	Michael Hopkins Associates/Anthony Hunt Associates/Greene King Brewery	Financial Times Industrial Architecture Award Winner 1980 Brewery process production facility
Patera Building	1982 Stoke-on-Trent UK	Michael Hopkins Architects/John Pringle/Anthony Hunt Associates/Mark Whitby/Longton Industrial Holdings Plc	Structural Steel Design Award 1983 commendation Original prototype moved to London Docklands in 1984 and moved again c1989 to Albert Island in the Royal Docks area of East London
Eden Project	2000 St Blazey, Cornwall, England, UK	Grimshaw Architects/Anthony Hunt Associates/Tim Smit	Visitor attraction and performance venue

== Use of computer-aided design ==
The use of computer-aided design (CAD) for 3D modelling, and therefore as a basic tool for architectural design, emerged during the 1990s Prior to that date, CAD had been used to a limited extent in structural analysis and as a means of managing and recording traditional drawings. 1983 saw the first 2D Autocad software designed for PC use. Earlier (c1975), "the architects (Gillinson Barnett & Partners) had to devise a computer programme to deal with the large number of components (in the Oasis Leisure Centre Dome roof, Swindon), and the ‘frame analysis’ was reportedly handled by a NASA computer at Houston". In c.1984, Ove Arup and Partners produced computer-generated 3D modelling of the Schlumberger Gould Research Centre, Cambridge, roof membrane.

With the widespread advance of IT, (the use of computers to store or retrieve data) CAD quickly became the essential tool of architectural and engineering design. Anthony Hunt is on record as saying: "... that it was only possible to design and construct the huge biodomes of the Eden Project... because of advances made in computer modelling techniques".

== Equality of opportunity ==
In the Sex Discrimination Act 1975, which led the way to establishment of the Equal Opportunities Commission (United Kingdom), parity between men and women in pay and opportunity became enshrined in law. This coincided with a group of women such as Alison Smithson, Wendy Foster, Su Rogers, Georgina Wolton and Patty Hopkins establishing themselves as equals in what had been up until then a predominately male-oriented profession.

== The post mid 1980s reversion to technological modernism ==
The mid 1980s saw not only the damning "is like a monstrous carbuncle on the face of a much-loved and elegant friend" speech by HRH Charles Prince of Wales, but also the death of several key proponents of British High Tech architecture – among which were Buckminster Fuller (1983), Jean Prouvé (1984), Walter Segal (1985) and Reyner Banham (1988), each of whom were significant for their teachings as well as for their building designs.

== Use of high-tech methodology for sports stadia ==
Following the Taylor Report, a Home Office report, the result of a public inquiry into "The Hillsborough Stadium Disaster 15 April 1989", recommendations were such that a new generation of all-seater football stadia became the norm for top division football clubs in the UK. Architects the Lobb Partnership (formerly Howard V Lobb & Partners) in conjunction with The Sports Council promoted designs for "A Stadium for the Nineties" giving rise to a new generation of UK football grounds, the first of which was Kirklees Stadium Huddersfield. Rod Sheard, Principal of Lobb Partnership (later known as Lobb Sports Architecture) designed a series of sports venues using High Tech methodology such as retractable roofs and flamboyant exposed steel structures.

== Sustainability ==
As an adjunct to Richard Buckminster Fuller's question "How much does your building weigh?", that expressed his philosophy of lightweight building which in turn reduced wastefulness and therefore conserved Earth's precious resources, he backed up this concept with his Dymaxion Map launched as "World Game: a unique experiment to develop a computer coordinated model of planet earth to research world resources and develop ways of running the future for the benefit of mankind".

== The Legacy of British High Tech ==
In both the worlds of science fiction, space travel and in areas of extreme climatic conditions on Earth, the imagery of British High Tech architecture endures in real projects as well as those imagined. A series of buildings and design competition entries for the Halley Research Station at Halley Bay, Antarctica and Ski Haus by Richard Horden/Anthony Hunt derive solutions for extremes of climate from High Tech imagery. David Nixon promotes similar interests "Design, Construction and Operation of Buildings and Habitats in Extreme Environments" and in "a book entitled 'Architecture of the International Space Station' – the first book to examine the Station from an architectural viewpoint" Hugh Broughton, one of the world's leading designers of polar research facilities including Halley VI, takes the High Tech concept further with designs for 'Building a Martian House' – an exhibition in Bristol led by local artists Ella Good and Nicki Kent.

In 2015 Foster + Partners were shortlisted finalists for the 3D Printed Habitat Challenge, organized by America Makes and NASA – submitting designs for a Mars settlement. Concept art for The Martian (2015) Steve Burg supposes accommodation modules on supporting legs (stilts) reminiscent of their light weight component-based bolt-together counterparts of the 1970s and 1980s such as the Rogers' Zip-Up House designed between 1967 and 1969 for The House of Today competition, and the aforementioned Hugh Broughton polar research station designs.

Archigram were awarded RIBA Royal Gold Medal in 2002. Other recipients of this prestigious award relevant to this article are (in reverse date order): Sir Nicholas Grimshaw (2019), Frei Otto (2005), Michael and Patricia Hopkins (1994), Peter Rice (1992), Colin Stansfield Smith (1991), Renzo Piano (1989), Sir Richard Rogers (1985), Sir Norman Foster (1983), Charles and Ray Eames (1979), Powell and Moya (1974) and Buckminster Fuller (1968), demonstrating that the legacy of Proponents of British high-tech architecture has remained at the forefront of architectural pioneering work well into the twenty-first century.
