= Volker Schumpelick =

German surgeon and researcher (1944–2022)

Volker Schumpelick (October 12, 1944 – January 17, 2022) was a German professor and researcher.

== Early life and education ==
Schumpelick born in Jena, Germany. He was the third of five children born to a family of physicians. He spent his childhood in Hamburg and began his medical studies in 1965 at universities in Munich and Berlin. He completed his medical degree in 1970 after training in Hamburg, Göttingen, and New York. Schumpelick started his surgical training at the University Medical Center Hamburg-Eppendorf under Hans Wilhelm Schreiber.

== Career ==
In his early academic career, Schumpelick received the Kurt-Hartwig-Siemers Scholarship (1976) and the Martini Award (1978) for his scientific work. His habilitation thesis was on the surgical treatment of gastro-duodenal stress ulcers. In 1985, he became the head of the Department of Surgery at the University Hospital (RWTH) in Aachen, making him the youngest professor to hold this position.

Although initially not focused on hernia, Schumpelick later made significant contributions to its study. He popularized the Shouldice technique in Germany and wrote a textbook on hernia in 1987. His work led to the Schumpelick classification for inguinal hernias, which influenced the European Hernia Society (EHS) classification system. In 1994, he initiated the first international hernia meeting in St. Moritz, which eventually led to the formation of the World Hernia Society.

During the 1990s, Schumpelick focused on the use of synthetic meshes in hernia repair and pioneered the "Light Weight Mesh Concept."

In 2001, Schumpelick founded the German Hernia Society, which became the largest national chapter of the EHS under his guidance. He served as the president of the EHS from 2013 to 2016 and organized the 4th International Hernia Congress in Berlin in 2009.
