= Anthony Hunt =

British engineer (1932–2022)

- Born: 22 June 1932; Streatham Hill, London, England
- Died: 16 August 2022 (aged 90); Painswick, Gloucestershire, England
- Education: Salesian College; Northampton Polytechnic; Westminster Technical College
- Spouses: Patricia Daniels (divorced); Diana Collett (divorced); Helene Moore
- Children: 2
- Engineering career
- Discipline: Structural engineer
- Institutions: Institution of Structural Engineers
- Practice name: Anthony Hunt Associates
- Projects: (Willis Faber Dumas HQ) (Sainsbury Centre) (Waterloo International) (Eden project)

Anthony James Hunt (22 June 1932 – 16 August 2022), familiarly known as Tony Hunt, was a British structural engineer of numerous buildings, with a career spanning from the 1950s until his retirement in 2002. As a leading proponent of British High Tech architecture and with a strong interest in both engineering and industrial design, Hunt was a major player in creating the High Tech movement of Norman Foster and Richard Rogers. He formed Anthony Hunt Associates in 1962. He worked with Rogers and Foster on Reliance Controls building in Swindon (1966) which was the first building of the British High Tech architecture, or more generally the High Tech architecture style. He was also a structural engineer on the Waterloo International railway station in London (1993).

== Early life ==
Hunt was the eldest child of a solicitor's clerk in Streatham Hill in London. He moved away from London with his mother and brother in order to avoid the Blitz, and finally settled in Farnborough, Hampshire. After leaving Salesian College at 16 he attended Northampton Polytechnic 1947 - 1948, but didn't complete the course. He then attended Westminster Technical College in London and studied civil engineering on a day release course. He first worked for Wheeler & Jupp, a small civil engineering firm in London, and later obtained a professional qualification in structural engineering.

== Career ==
Hunt was impressed by the Festival of Britain's Skylon, engineered by Frank Newby and Felix Samuely of FJ Samuely & Partners, two of the most influential engineers at the time. This inspired him to seek employment with the firm, which he achieved. It was with FJ Samuely & Partners that Hunt really developed his passion for structural engineering, working on projects such as Eero Saarinen's American Embassy in London.

Following a spell working for Terence Conran and for Hancock Associates, Hunt founded Anthony Hunt Associates in 1962. He worked extensively with a new generation of British Architects, including Norman Foster, Richard Rogers, Michael Hopkins and Nicholas Grimshaw and played a large role in developing the lightweight, component-based style known as British high tech architecture. Throughout his career, Hunt maintained a keen interest in the wider aspects of industrial design.

In 1994 he received the Gold Medal from the Institution of Structural Engineers.

== Death ==
Hunt died from heart failure at his home in Painswick, Gloucestershire, on 16 August 2022, aged 90.

== Selected projects ==
- 1962 Leicester University Library, Structair system, Leicester (architects: Castle and Park)
- 1971 New Parliamentary Extension, Westminster, London. Unbuilt design (architects: Spence and Webster)
- 1975 Willis Faber Dumas building Ipswich (architect: Foster Associates)
- 1976 van den Bossche house, Fluy, France (architect: Ian Ritchie)
- 1978 Sainsbury Centre for Visual Arts phase 1 Norwich UK (architects: Foster Associates)
- 1982 Inmos microprocessor factory, Newport (architects: Richard Rogers and Partners)
- 1991 Waterloo International railway station, London (architects: Nicholas Grimshaw and Partners)
- 1994 Hauer King House, Canonbury, London (architects: Future Systems)
- 1996 West India Quay Footbridge, Docklands London (architects: Future Systems)
- 1997 Kirklees Stadium, Huddersfield, Yorkshire (architects: Lobb Partnership)
- 1998 Dyson Factory, Malmesbury, Wiltshire (architects: Wilkinson Eyre)
- 2001 Mount Stuart visitor centre, Isle of Bute, Scotland (architects: Munkenbeck and Marshall)
