= Mark Whitby =

British canoeist and engineer (born 1950)

Mark Whitby (born 29 January 1950) is a British engineer, President of the Institution of Civil Engineers (2001–2002) and former Olympic canoeist. He co-founded the multi-disciplinary engineering practices Whitby & Bird (later known as whitbybird), Whitby & Mohajer Engineers (WME) in the UAE, and Whitby Wood in the UK.

== Early life and education ==
Whitby was born in Ealing, West London, the third of the six children of architect George Whitby (1916-1973, McMorran & Whitby). He was educated at Ealing Grammar School for Boys (1961-1968), followed by undergraduate studies in engineering at King's College London (1969-1972).

He was a British sprint canoeist, representing Great Britain at the 1968 Summer Olympics in Mexico City, where he was eliminated in the semifinals of the K-2 1000 m event.

== Career ==
After graduation, Whitby worked for consulting engineer Harris & Sutherland for a year, followed by four years on site for Sir Lindsay Parkinson/Sir John Fairclough (AMEC) and a period on site for civil engineering contractor John Howard and Co. Ltd. He then joined consulting engineer Buro Happold. A year or two later, he took up a position with Anthony Hunt & Associates. While there, he worked on a series of diverse projects, including the high tech Patera Building designed by a proponent of British High Tech architecture Michael Hopkins, Halley IV research station for the British Antarctic Survey, and a timber dome at Crestone, Colorado, USA, with architect Keith Critchlow. In 1982, he set up a London office for Leeds-based Robert T Horne & Partners.

In 1983, Whitby co-founded engineering partnership Whitby & Bird with Bryn Bird, who had also worked at Harris & Sutherland. Mike Crane joined as a partner in 1985. The practice later changed its name to Whitby Bird & Partners, then whitbybird. Whitby was a director of the company. Notable projects include several bridges in the UK and the British Embassies in Dublin and Berlin. He developed a media profile and started to be consulted on engineering issues for TV and radio. In this period, he also co-founded energy consultant Element Energy, sold to ERM in 2021.

In August 2007, whitbybird merged with Danish engineering group Ramboll, and was rebranded Ramboll Whitbybird. Whitby remained with the company, and when in April 2009 it became Ramboll UK, he was named Chairman, a position he retained until he left later the same year. Before he left, he was director responsible for the company’s commission to undertake engineering services for the extension to Tate Modern (architect: Herzog & de Meuron).

Between 2010 and 2016, Whitby was a director of structural engineering consultancy Davies Maguire + Whitby, which he co-founded in 2010. In that period, he also co-founded Whitby & Mohajer Engineers (later WME, sold to Egis Group in 2022) in Dubai in 2011 with structural engineer Peyman Mohajer. In 2016, he set up the London office of WME with co-director Sebastian Wood, and this London practice changed its name to Whitby Wood in 2017.

Whitby served as a Member of Council at the Institution of Civil Engineers (ICE) from 1993 to 1996. In 1998, he became the ICE’s Vice President (Education), then served as President from 2001 to 2002.

In 2006, he co-authored the Report of the First Enquiry 2006, All Party Parliamentary Climate Change Group: Is a Cross-Party Consensus on Climate Change Possible — or Desirable?, with Dr Helen Clayton and Prof Nick Pidgeon.

Whitby appeared with archaeologist Julian Richards in the BBC TV series, Secrets of Lost Empires: Stonehenge (1994, broadcast 1997), in which the team tried (and succeeded) to move and erect simulated standing stones using only the technologies available to prehistoric builders.

== Engineering projects ==
Structural engineering projects, and projects for which Whitby was instrumental in the construction, include:

- Halley IV, British Antarctic Survey (architect: Angus Jamieson, structural engineering: Anthony Hunt & Associates)
- Patera Building System (architect: Michael Hopkins & Partners, structural engineering: Anthony Hunt & Associates)
- British Embassy Dublin (1995, architect: Allies and Morrison, structural engineering: Whitby Bird & Partners)
- Sadler's Wells Theatre (rebuild) (1998, architect: Arts Team@RHWL, structural engineering: Whitby Bird & Partners)
- British Embassy Berlin (2000, architect: Michael Wilford & Partners, structural engineering: Whitby Bird & Partners)
- York Millennium Bridge (2001, design: Whitby Bird & Partners)
- Lancaster Millennium Bridge (2001, design: Whitby Bird & Partners)
- 30 Finsbury Square (2003, architect: Eric Parry Architects, structural engineering: whitbybird)
- British Embassy Sana’a (2006, architect: Design Engine Architects, structural engineering: whitbybird)
- The Hepworth Wakefield (2003-2011, architect: David Chipperfield Architects, structural engineering: whitbybird, then Ramboll Whitbybird)
- Ferrari World Abu Dhabi (2010, architect: Benoy, structural engineering: Ramboll Whitbybird, then Ramboll UK)
- River Island Bridge, Canning Town (2015, Mark Whitby)
- Tate Modern extension (2016, architect: Herzog & de Meuron, structural engineering: Ramboll Whitbybird, then Ramboll UK)
- Anthony Timberlands Center, University of Arkansas (architect: Grafton Architects, Modus Studio, structural engineering: Whitby Wood, TSW Engineers)
- The Dunard Centre, Edinburgh (completion 2028, architect: David Chipperfield Architects, structural engineering: Whitby Wood)

== Teaching ==
Throughout his career, Whitby has taught engineering and architecture students at tertiary level, and delivered public and private lectures. He has taught at Oxford Brookes University (1982-1998) (lecturer, tutor, examiner), the University of Cambridge (part time) (structural philosophy) and the Architectural Association (1984-1998) (lecturer, tutor). In 2007, he was appointed Special Professor of Sustainable Construction Professor at Nottingham University, and in March 2014, Visiting Professor in Structural Engineering at the Bartlett School of Architecture.

Among the subjects of his public lectures are the Fukushima Daiichi nuclear disaster, the work of engineer Peter Rice (1935-1992), how Stonehenge might have been built, and the work and professional practice of whitbybird.

== Philanthropy ==
Whitby has been instrumental in the formation of a number of organisations that cover the broad culture of engineering. In the 1980s, he founded the Engineering Club, which is an association of engineering practices that hosts events in central London (ongoing). He also founded Engineering Timelines, an education charity that runs a website on the history of engineering. In the late 1990s, he co-founded the multidisciplinary built environment think tank, The Edge. He is President of the Trustees of CODEP (Construction and Development Partnership), a construction industry-led charity working in London and Sierra Leone, and a founding trustee of the Whitbybird Foundation.

Professional and academic associations
Preceded by Joseph Dwyer	President of the Institution of Civil Engineers; November 2001 – November 2002	Succeeded by Adrian Long
