= High-tech architecture =

Architectural style that emerged in the 1970s

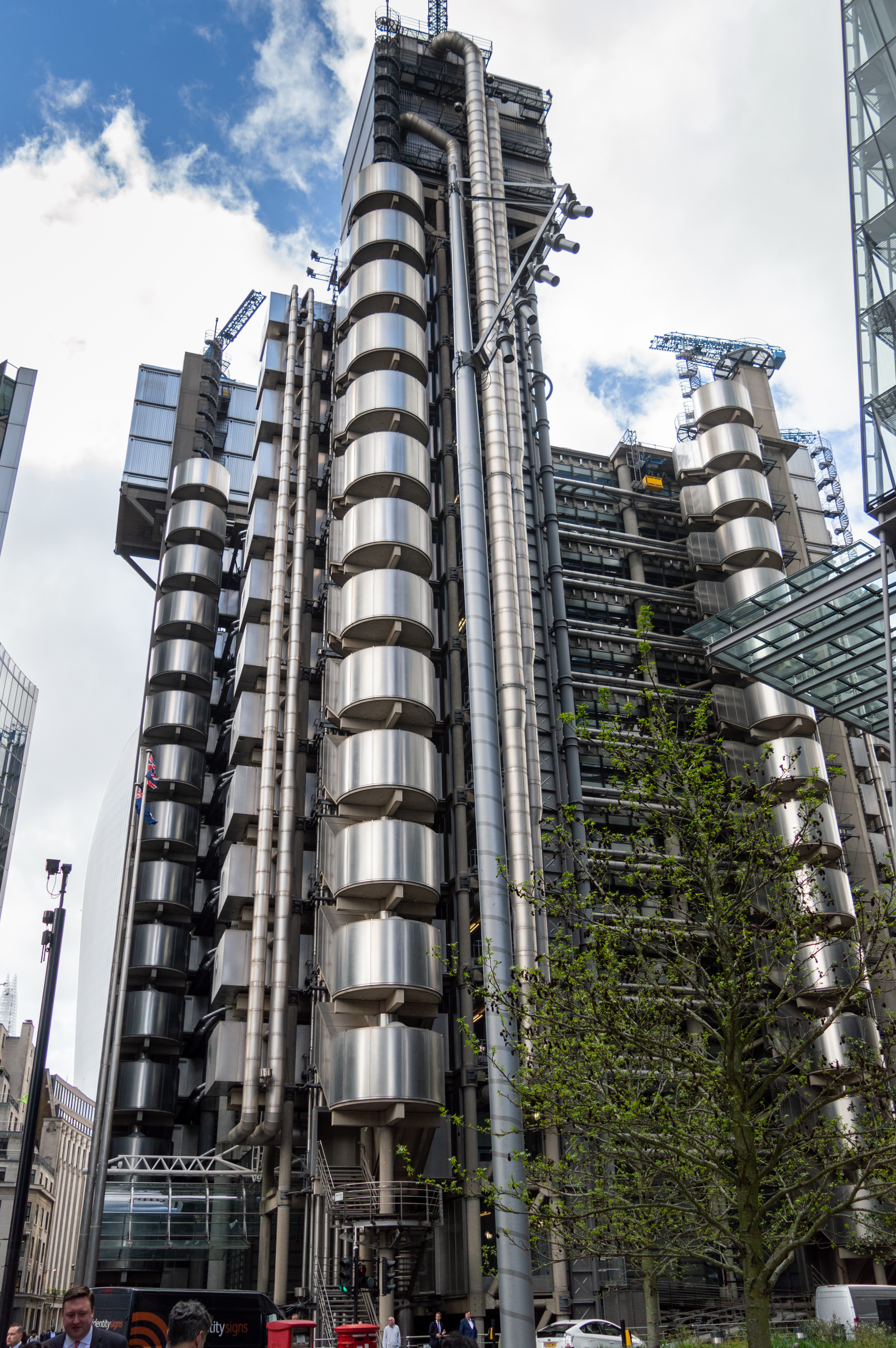
- The Lloyd's building in London, by Richard Rogers
- Years active: 1960–present
- Location: International

High-tech architecture, also known as structural expressionism, is a type of late modernist architecture that emerged in the 1970s, incorporating elements of high tech industry and technology into building design. High-tech architecture grew from the modernist style, utilizing new advances in technology and building materials. It emphasizes transparency in design and construction, seeking to communicate the underlying structure and function of a building throughout its interior and exterior. High-tech architecture makes extensive use of aluminium, steel, glass, and to a lesser extent concrete (the technology for which had developed earlier), as these materials were becoming more advanced and available in a wider variety of forms at the time the style was developing – generally, advancements in a trend towards lightness of weight.

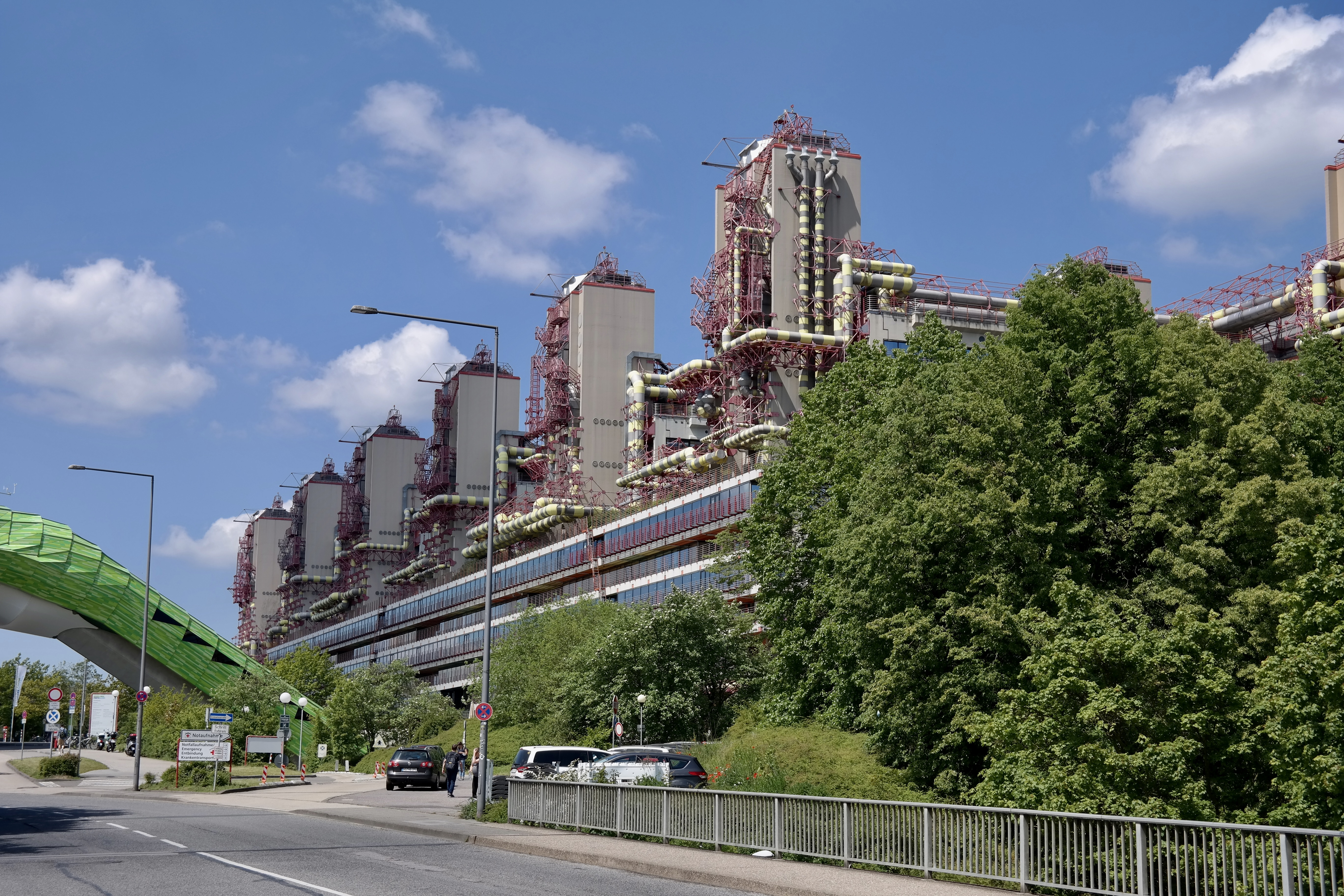
Uniklinikum Aachen (NRW, Germany), completed in 1985

High-tech architecture focuses on creating adaptable buildings through choice of materials, internal structural elements, and programmatic design. It seeks to avoid links to the past, and as such eschews building materials commonly used in older styles of architecture. Common elements include hanging or overhanging floors, a lack of internal load-bearing walls, and reconfigurable spaces. Some buildings incorporate prominent, bright colors in an attempt to evoke the sense of a drawing or diagram. High-tech utilizes a focus on factory aesthetics and a large central space serviced by many smaller maintenance areas to evoke a feeling of openness, honesty, and transparency.

Early high-tech buildings were referred to by historian Reyner Banham as "serviced sheds" due to their exposure of mechanical services in addition to the structure. Most of these early examples used exposed structural steel as their material of choice. As hollow structural sections, (developed by Stewarts and Lloyds and known in the UK as Rectangular Hollow Section (RHS)) had only become widely available in the early 1970s, high-tech architecture saw much experimentation with this material.

The style's premier practitioners include the following: Sir Michael Hopkins, Bruce Graham, Fazlur Rahman Khan, Minoru Yamasaki, Sir Norman Foster, Sir Richard Rogers, Renzo Piano, and Santiago Calatrava.

== Background ==
High-tech architecture was originally developed in Britain, with many of its most famous early proponents being British. However, the movement has roots in a number of earlier styles and draws inspiration from a number of architects from earlier periods. Many of the ideals communicated through high-tech architecture were derived from the early modernists of the 1920s. The concepts of transparency, honesty in materials, and a fascination with the aesthetics of industry can all be traced to modern architects. High-tech architecture, much like modernism, shares a belief in a "spirit of the age" that should be incorporated and applied throughout each building. The influence of Le Corbusier, Walter Gropius, and Mies van de Rohe is extensive throughout many of the principles and designs of high-tech architecture.

Some of the earliest practitioners of high-tech architecture included the British architecture group Archigram, whose members frequently designed advanced futuristic buildings and cities. On the most influential of these was Peter Cook's Plug-in City, a theoretical mega structure designed around the detach-ability and replacement of each of its individual units. The concept of removable and interchangeable elements of buildings would later become a widespread characteristic within the high-tech style. Less direct precursors included Buckminster Fuller and Frei Otto, whose focus on minimizing construction resources generated an emphasis on tensile structures, another important element in many high-tech designs. Louis Kahn's concept of "served" and "servant" spaces, particularly when implemented in the form of service towers, later became a widespread feature of high-tech architecture.

Other projects and designs that contained or inspired elements common across the high-tech style include the Archigram member Mike Webb's concept of bowellism, the Fun Palace by Cedric Price, and the Walking City by Ron Herron, also a member of Archigram. These theoretical designs, along with many others, were circulated widely in British and American architectural circles due to their examination by Reyner Banham. These conceptual plans laid out the ideas and elements that would later go on to be hugely influential in the works of prominent high-tech architects like Norman Foster and Nicholas Grimshaw.

== Characteristics ==
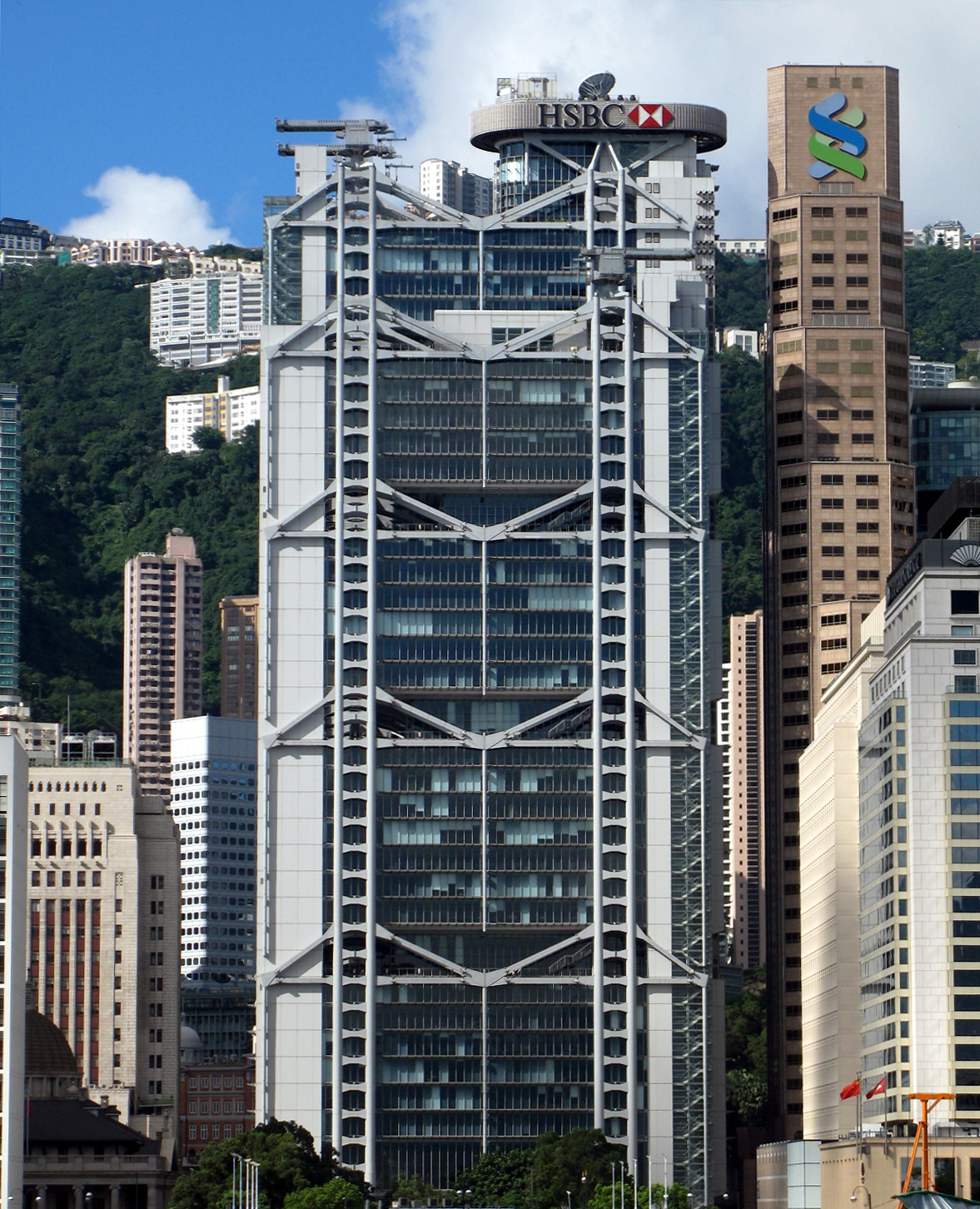
The HSBC Hong Kong headquarters, completed in 1985

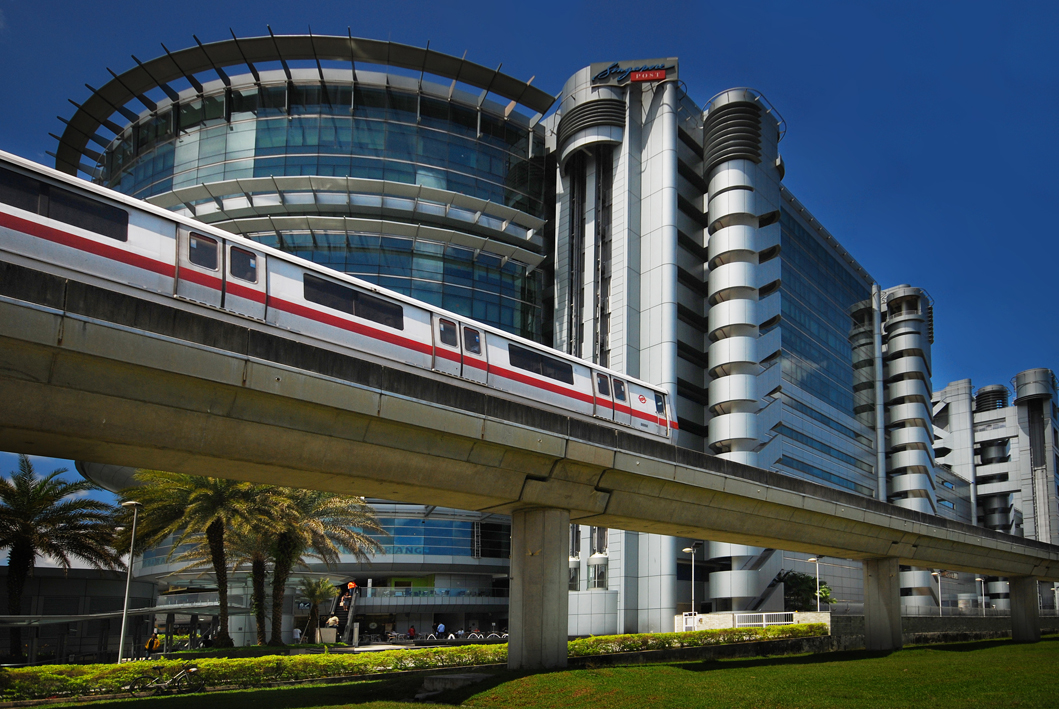
SingPost Centre, completed in 1999 by RDC Architects, houses 138,000 sqm of mail and parcel sorting area, commercial space and office accommodation.

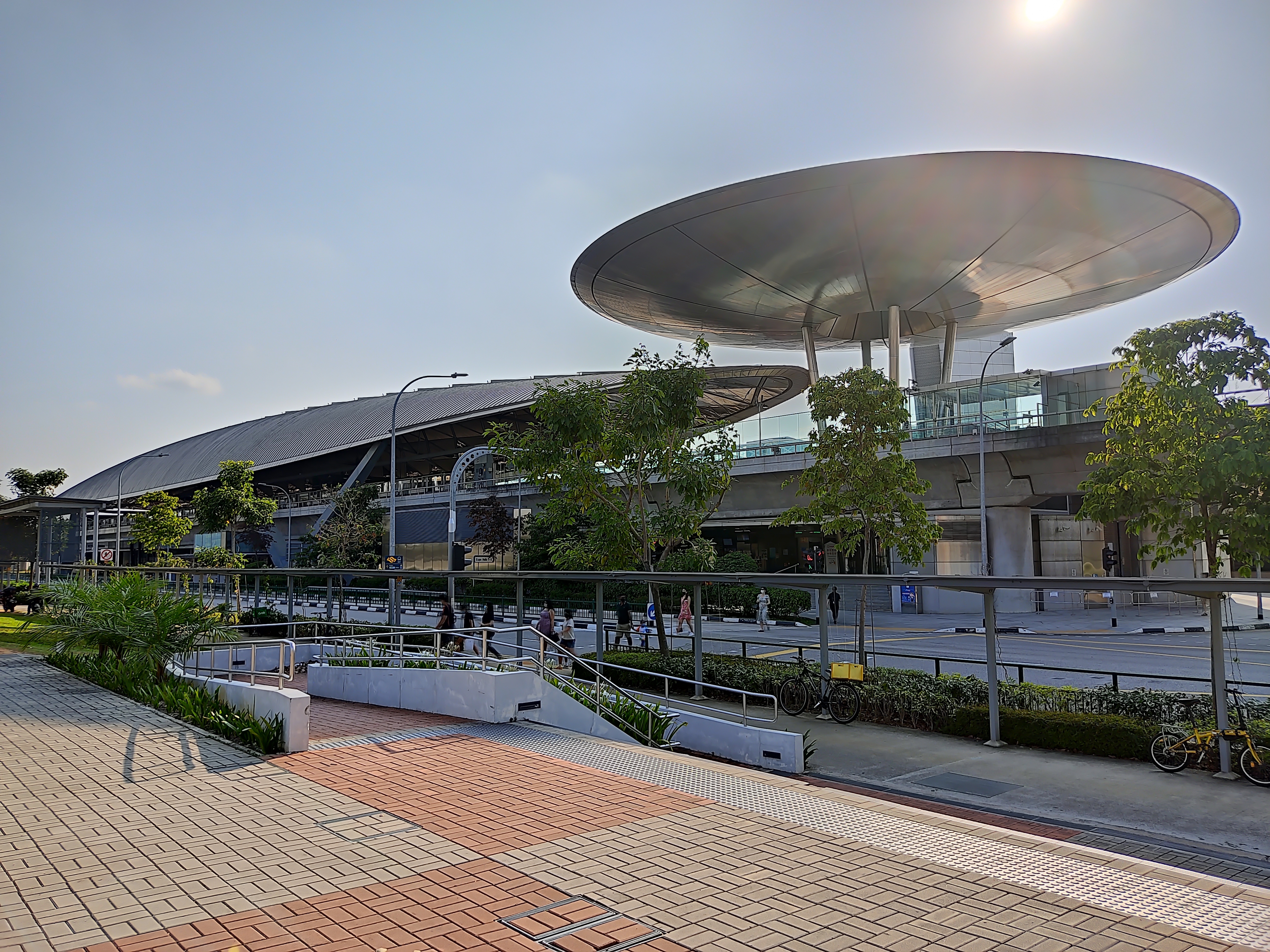
The Expo MRT Station in Singapore is designed with a distinctive 40-metre-diameter disc, clad in stainless steel, which shelters the ticket hall and marks the station entrance. It is designed to blend in with the neighboring Singapore Expo complex.

High-tech buildings often incorporate a range of materials reminiscent of industrial production. Steel, aluminium, glass, and concrete are all commonly found in high-tech structures, as these elements evoke a feeling of being mass-produced and widely available. Not all high-tech designs are made to accommodate truly mass-produced materials, but nonetheless seek to convey a sense of factory creation and broad distribution. Tensile structures, cross beams, and exposed support and maintenance elements are all important components found in high-tech designs. A focus on strong, simplistic, and transparent elements all connect high-tech as a style to the principles of engineering. The engineer Anthony Hunt was hugely influential in both the design, choice of materials, and ultimate expression of many of the earliest high-tech buildings in Britain, and as such many of these designs are suffused with a focus on the aesthetics of engineering and construction.

Buildings built in the high-tech style often share a number of characteristic layout elements. These include an open floor plan, a large central area serviced by many smaller maintenance spaces, and repeated elements which either can be or appear to be able to be detached and replaced as needed. Spaces or elements dedicated to service and mechanical components like air conditioners, water processors, and electrical equipment are left exposed and visible to the viewer. Often these spaces are placed in large service towers external to the building, as in the Lloyd's building in London by Richard Rogers. The Lloyd's building also has offices designed to be changed and configured as needed by the shifting and removal of partitions – creating a flexible and adaptable interior environment that can be changed to meet the needs of the building's occupants. This theme of reconfigurable spaces is an important component of high-tech buildings. The HSBC Building in Hong Kong, designed by Norman Foster, is another excellent example of a high-tech building designed to be changed over time according to the needs of its users. Its use of suspended floor panels and the design of its social spaces as individual towers both place emphasis on the new approach to creating and servicing an office building.

The high-tech style is often interpreted as glorifying technology and emphasizing the functional purpose of each element of the building. These designs incorporate elements that obviously display the technical nature of the components within them, creating a sense of honest, open transparency. The Centre Pompidou in Paris, by Renzo Piano and Richard Rogers, exemplifies the technicality and focus on the exposure of service elements. The externalization of functional components is a key concept of high-tech architecture, though this technique may also be applied to generate an aesthetic of dynamic light and shadow across the facade of a building. Color also plays an important role in the decoration of high-tech buildings, as various colors can be used to represent different service elements or to give the building the appearance of a set of architectural diagrams.

As of 2016, recent Structural Impressionism has two major trends: braced systems and diagrid systems. Both structural systems have the structural support elements visible from the outside, unlike many postmodern architecture buildings where most structural elements are hidden in the interior. The braced systems have strong exterior columns connected by "heavy" cross bracing elements. The diagrid system consists of a lattice of "light" diagonal elements and horizontal rings forming triangles, without vertical columns.

== Goals ==
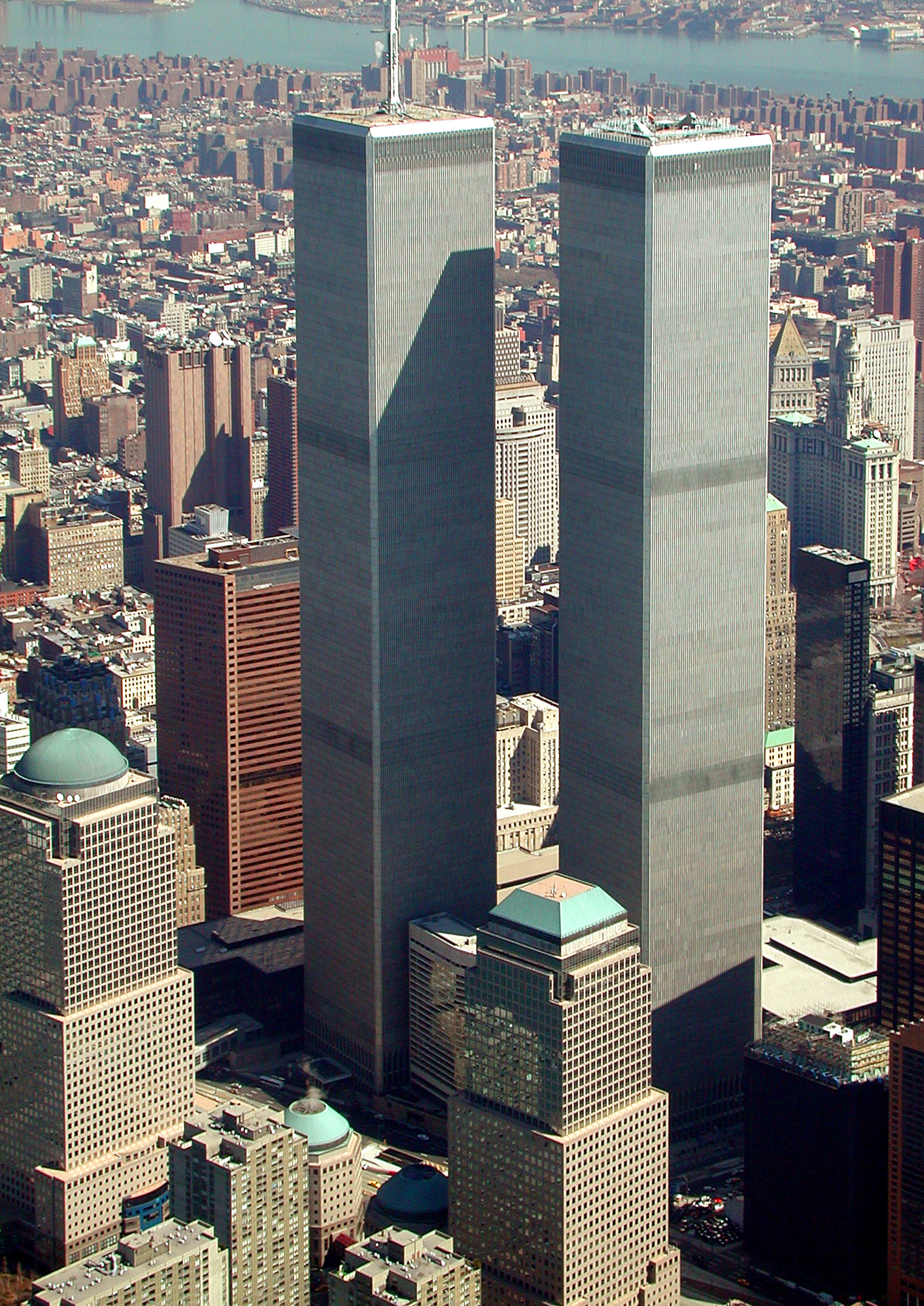
The Original World Trade Center in New York City, by Minoru Yamasaki. The Twin Towers had completely open floor plans, with zero internal columns.

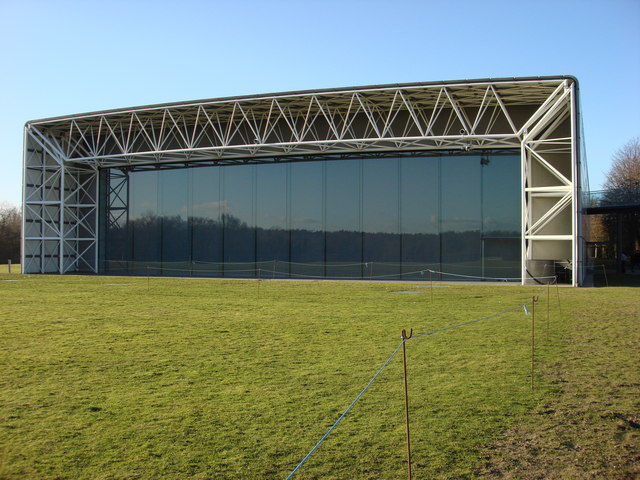
Sainsbury Centre in Norwich, by Foster and Associates

High-tech architecture attempts to embody a series of ideals that its practitioners felt were reflective of the "spirit of the age". Concerns over adaptability, sustainability, and the changing industrial world drove a shift in the way that many architects around the world approached the challenge of designing buildings. Norman Foster's HSBC Building was specifically designed to be built over a public plaza, so as not to take up more land in space-conscious Hong Kong. Minoru Yamasaki's World Trade Center had centered around a five-acre, raised public plaza, completely devoid of cars, so pedestrians could walk freely through the complex. Additionally, the World Trade Center had led to the construction of a brand new PATH station, serving the rail commuters coming from New Jersey into New York. This approach to building, with the architect having just as much responsibility to the city surrounding their building as the building itself, was a key theme of many structures designed in the high-tech style. The appropriate utilization and distribution of space is often an integral component of high-tech theory, and as such these ideals are often found in concert with practical concerns over habitability and practicality of design.

At the core of many high-tech buildings is the concept of the "omniplatz". This is the idea that a building and the spaces within it should not necessarily be absolutely defined, but rather perform a range of desired functions. As such, a room in a high-tech building could be used as a factory floor, a storage room, or a financial trading center all with minimal re-distribution of structural elements. The external services of a high-tech building, in this understanding of the style, exist solely to make the central space habitable and do not define its function. This can lead to an effect wherein the maintenance elements of a building can be understood and interpreted without issue, but the function of the interior space is difficult to guess. The Lloyd's building is an excellent example of this, wherein its service towers quite clearly communicate their function but the usage of the central atrium is difficult to determine from the exterior.

While the goal of many high-tech buildings is to honestly and transparently communicate their form and function, practical considerations may prevent the absolute expression of this principle. The Centre Pompidou, for example, has several elements that are built up or covered over due to concerns over fire safety and structural soundness. In many cases high-tech buildings exhibit compromises between radical honesty in design and considerations of safety in implementation. High-tech architecture balances art and engineering as its primary themes, and as such incurs trade-offs between the aesthetics of the two disciplines.

High-tech architecture has generated some criticism for its forays into home building and design, an issue it shares in common with Modernism. Many of the houses designed by high-tech architects were never inhabited by anyone other than themselves or their close relatives. Many outside observers found the high-tech style's focus on industry and expression of services to be antithetical to comfort and home living. Norman Foster's housing at Milton Keynes was never particularly popular, and other high-tech designs were seen as uncomfortable or awkward to live in.

High-tech architecture was most commonly employed in the construction of factories, corporate offices, or art galleries, all spaces that could effectively leverage the aesthetic of industry and find good use for the flexible spaces the style created. The application of technological themes throughout high-tech buildings intends to convey an ethos of science and progress. While transparency and honesty of materials is heavily valued, high-tech designs strive to evoke an ever dynamic sense of movement and change. Adaptability, flexibility, and openness are all key aims of the high-tech style. To obviously and creatively display the functional nature of service elements and to clearly communicate the changeable nature of the spaces created inside them are important goals of the vast majority of high-tech buildings.

== Examples ==
Name of building	Place	Country	Architect	Year
BMA Tower	Kansas City, Missouri	United States	Bruce Graham	1961
Riverplace Tower	Jacksonville, Florida	United States	Welton Becket	1967
Irvine Company headquarters	Newport Beach, California	United States	William Pereira	1968
Mercy Hospital and Medical Center	Chicago, Illinois	United States	C.F. Murphy & Associates	1968
John Hancock Center	Chicago, Illinois	United States	Bruce Graham	1969
Istra High Voltage Research Center	Moscow	Soviet Union	Moscow Power Engineering Institute	1970
World Trade Center	New York City	United States	Minoru Yamasaki	1971
Willis Tower	Chicago, Illinois	United States	Bruce Graham	1973
Marquette Plaza	Minneapolis, Minnesota	United States	Gunnar Birkerts	1973
Hopkins House	London	United Kingdom	Michael Hopkins and Partners	1976
One US Bank Plaza	St. Louis, Missouri	United States	Thompson, Ventulett, Stainback & Associates	1976
Bielefeld University	Bielefeld	Germany	Klaus Köpke, Wolf Siepmann, Helmut Herzog, Katte Töpper	1976
Centre Georges Pompidou	Paris	France	Renzo Piano and Richard Rogers	1977
Internationales Congress Centrum Berlin	Berlin	Germany	Ralf Schüler, Ursulina Schüler-Witte	1979
Sport- und Erholungszentrum (SEZ)	Berlin	Germany	Erhardt Gißke	1981
Aon Centre	Wellington	New Zealand	Stephenson & Turner	1983
ARK Dental Clinic Building	Kyoto	Japan	Shin Takamatsu	1983
PHARAOH Dental Clinic Building	Kyoto	Japan	Shin Takamatsu	1984
HSBC Hong Kong headquarters building	Hong Kong	Hong Kong SAR	Norman Foster	1985
Uniklinikum Aachen	Aachen	Germany	Weber & Brand	1985
Lloyd's Building	London	United Kingdom	Richard Rogers	1986
San Diego Convention Center	San Diego	United States	Arthur Erickson	1989
Bank of China Tower	Hong Kong	Hong Kong SAR	I.M. Pei	1989
Hotel Arts	Barcelona	Spain	Bruce Graham	1992
Žižkov TV Tower	Prague	Czech Republic	Václav Aulický, Jiří Kozák	1992
Mesiniaga Tower	Subang Jaya, Selangor	Malaysia	Ken Yeang	1992
Petronas Towers	Kuala Lumpur	Malaysia	César Pelli	1993
Lord's Media Centre	London	United Kingdom	Future Systems	1999
Burj Al Arab	Dubai	United Arab Emirates	Tom Wright	1999
Singapore Post Centre	Singapore	Singapore	RDC Architects Pte Ltd	1999
Singapore Expo	Singapore	Singapore	Cox Richardson Rayner	1999
Expo MRT station	Singapore	Singapore	Norman Foster	2001
National Stadium	Singapore	Singapore	Arup	2014
City of Manchester Stadium	Manchester	United Kingdom	Arup	2002
30 St. Mary Axe	London	United Kingdom	Norman Foster	2003
Turning Torso	Malmö	Sweden	Santiago Calatrava	2004
Hearst Tower	New York City	United States	Norman Foster	2004
Torre Glòries	Barcelona	Spain	Jean Nouvel	2005
National Library	Singapore	Singapore	T. R. Hamzah and Yeang	2005
Wembley Stadium	London	United Kingdom	Norman Foster	2006
Leslie L. Dan Pharmacy Building	Toronto, Ontario	Canada	Norman Foster	2006
Marina Bay Sands	Singapore	Singapore	Moshe Safdie	2010
Diagonal Zero Zero	Barcelona	Spain	Enric Massip-Bosch	2011
Mercury City Tower	Moscow IBC	Russia	Frank Williams	2013
The Leadenhall Building	London	United Kingdom	Rogers + Stirk + Harbour	2013
Raffles City Chongqing	Chongqing	China	Moshe Safdie	2019
270 Park Avenue	New York City	United States	Foster and Partners	2025

== See also ==
- Bowellism
- British high-tech architecture
- Catherine gardens
