= Waterloo International railway station =

Former Eurostar terminus in London

Waterloo International
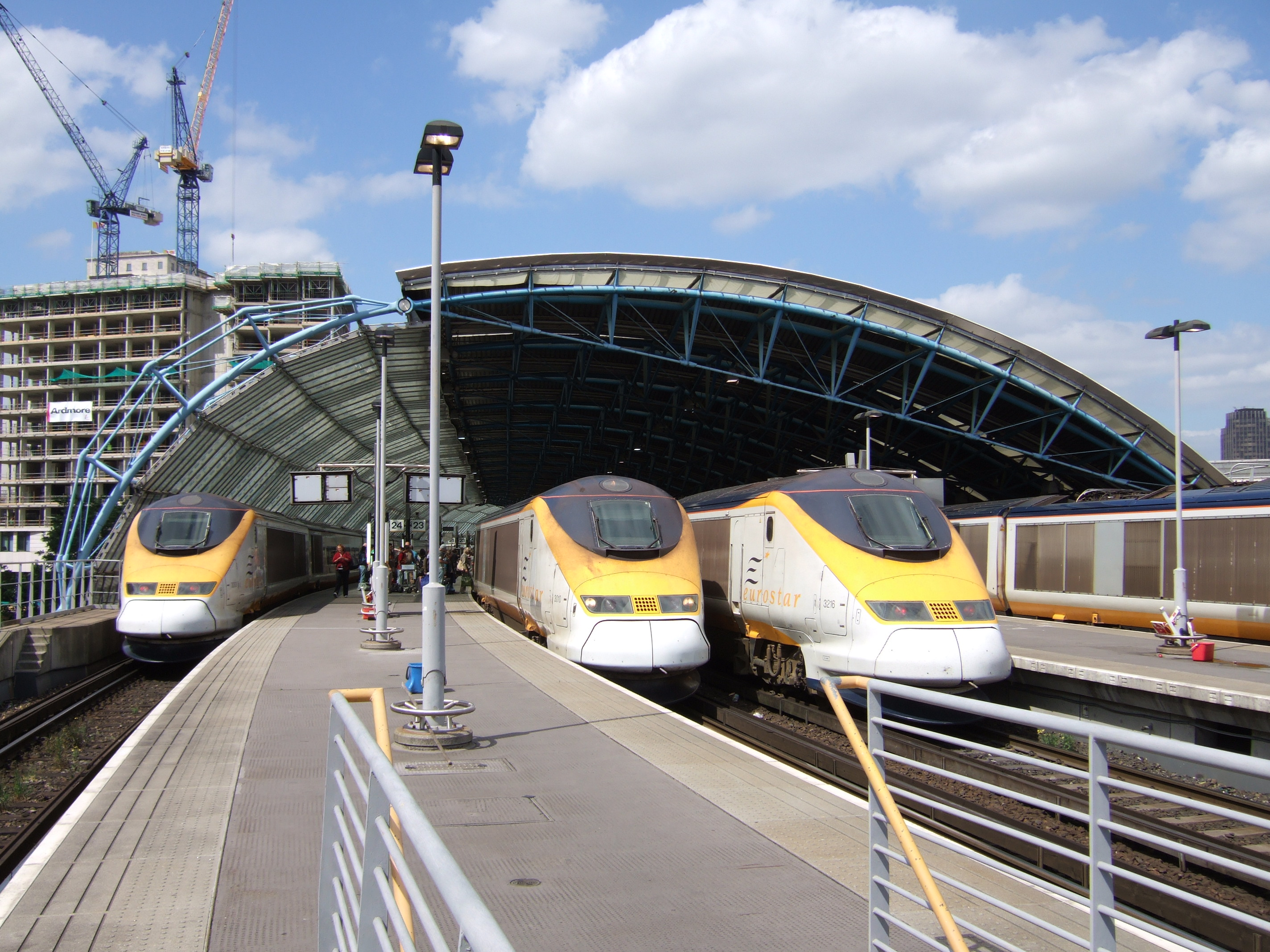
- Four Eurostar Class 373s at Waterloo International in June 2006
- Interactive map of Waterloo International

General information
- Location: South Bank
- Local authority: London Borough of Lambeth
- Managed by: Network Rail
- Owner: Network Rail
- Station code: WIT
- Number of platforms: 5

Key dates
- 14 November 1994: Opened
- 13 November 2007: Closed
- 10 December 2018: Platforms 20–22 reopened as part of London Waterloo
- 19 May 2019: Platforms 23–24 reopened as part of London Waterloo
- Replaced by: London St Pancras International (international services); London Waterloo (physical station)

Other information
- External links: Departures; Facilities
- Coordinates: 51°30′11″N 0°06′53″W

Waterloo International station was the London terminus of the Eurostar international rail service from its opening on 14 November 1994 to its closure on 13 November 2007, when it was replaced by London St Pancras International as the terminal for international rail services following the opening of High Speed 1 (HS1). It was on the western side of London Waterloo mainline station but was managed and branded separately.

In August 2017, the buildings and platforms were reopened for one month while platforms within the main station were rebuilt. After a period of redevelopment, platforms 20–22 reopened as part of the main station in December 2018, followed by platforms 23 and 24 in May 2019.

== History ==
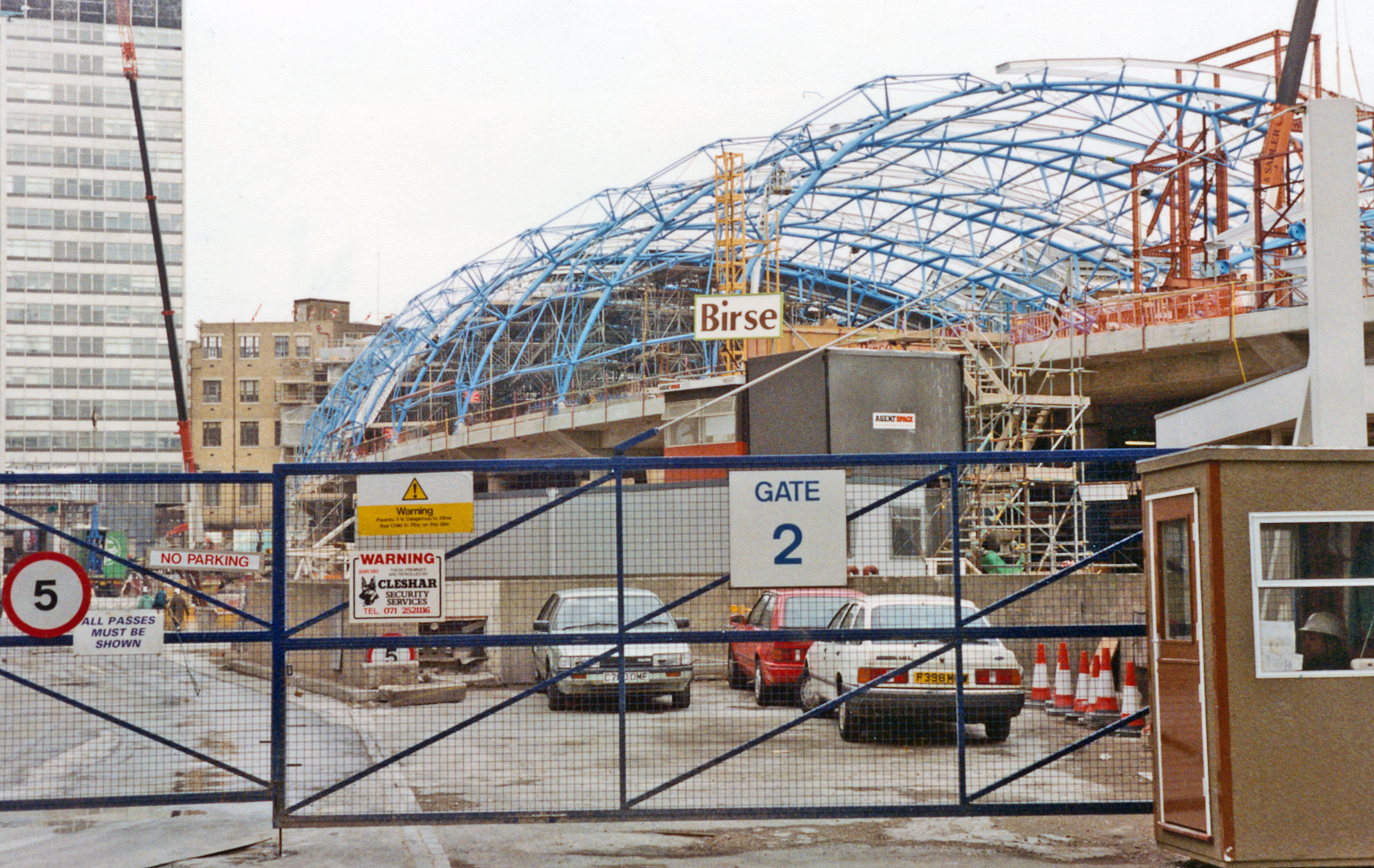
Waterloo International during construction in 1992

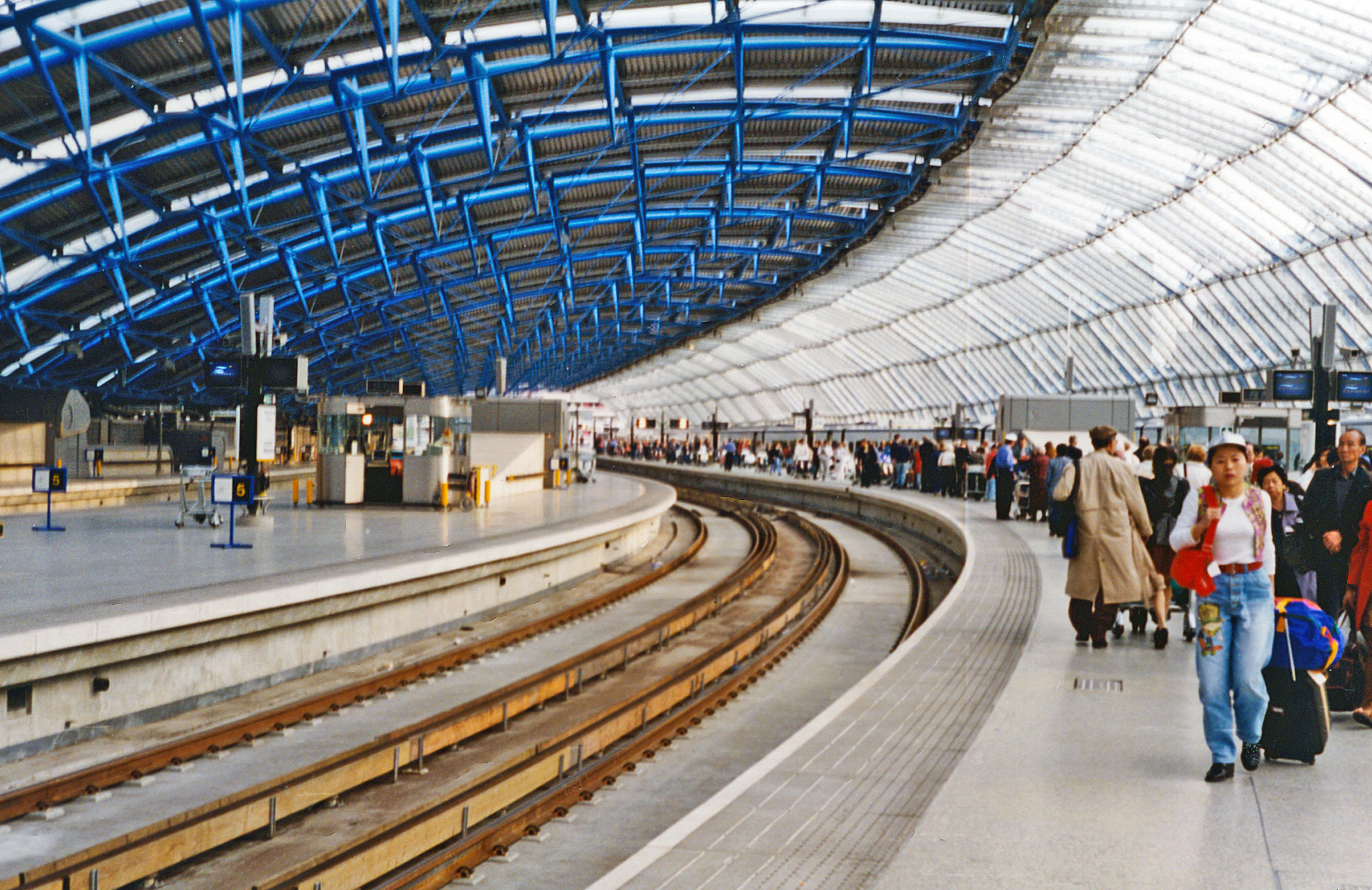
Waterloo International arch

The station was designed by Grimshaw Architects with Sir Alexander Gibb & Partners appointed consultant engineers. In October 1990, Bovis Construction was awarded the construction contract. It was completed in May 1993, in time for the scheduled completion of the Channel Tunnel. Construction of the tunnel was delayed however, and the station did not open until November 1994, when it won the European Union Prize for Contemporary Architecture as well as the Royal Institute of British Architects' Building of the Year Award.

Waterloo International had five platforms, numbered 20 to 24, one (20) taken from the mainline station, and four new ones. Unlike the platforms at the main station, they were long enough to accommodate trains of up to 20 coaches (total length 394 metres (1,293 ft)). The platforms were all covered by a 400 metres (1,300 ft) long glass and steel vault of 36 arches forming a prismatic structure, conceived by Anthony Hunt Associates. The five vaults are supported by a grid of cylindrical concrete columns that rise up from the carpark level, through the circulation levels to the platforms. A structural glass wall separated the existing Waterloo station from the International station.

A two-level reception area fronted the main station concourse. The curvature of the roof is steeper on the western side and here the trains passed close to the structure. The roof arches are made up of two dissimilar curved trusses, triangular in section, with compression booms of tubular steel (CFS) and tension booms of solid steel. Both compression and tension members are curved – structural engineer Anthony Hunt described the trusses as "banana shaped". Curved, tapering trusses were later used to great effect at Kirklees Stadium in Huddersfield.

The first Eurostar departure was on 14 November 1994, and the last service left on 13 November 2007. From the next day Eurostar services used their new London terminus of St Pancras International.

=== Post-Eurostar ===
Ownership of Waterloo International station passed from London & Continental Railways to BRB (Residuary) Limited, with no clear plans for the future use of the Eurostar platforms. Some reports had suggested that they might be used for shops, but a parliamentary written answer of 4 June 2008 stated platform 20 was to be used by some South West Trains services from December 2008. At the time of closure, Network Rail had no immediate plans to use the other four former international platforms for domestic use and they were disused from November 2007.

From 4 July 2010 to 2 January 2011 two of the disused platforms hosted theatrical performances of Edith Nesbit's The Railway Children. The audience was seated either side of the actual railway track. The show includes the use of a steam engine, coupled to one of the original carriages from the 1970 film being shunted in and out of the theatre area as required by a Class 08 shunter.

All the former international platforms were temporarily used for regional services during the refurbishment of the main station from Christmas 2013. Platform 20 came back into regular use for timetabled services in May 2014.

In March 2016, it was announced that the platforms and terminal building were to be incorporated into the main station as part of an £800 million refurbishment. In August 2017, the platforms were used temporarily while other platforms were upgraded, and after a further period of closure for redevelopment, they were permanently brought back into use in December 2018 (20, 21 and 22) and May 2019 (23 and 24). The terminal building started a new life as a shopping centre called "The Sidings" in late 2022.

Preceding station	National Rail	Following station
Terminus	South Western Railway; South West Main Line	Vauxhall
	Disused Railways	
Terminus	Eurostar; London to Paris/Brussels	Ashford; International
