= Catherine gardens =

Catherine gardens is an architectural concept where large ecosystems are enclosed in huge shells around buildings to protect them from pollution. This is also referred to as "floating ecosystems" that can be retrofitted on high rise buildings or "hollow ecosystems" because of the empty spaces predicted in the design.

== Etymology ==
The Catherine garden gets its name from circular growth pattern of the ivy plants as a projection of the architect's thought, similar to the Catherine wheel.

== Aim ==
The concept is aimed at providing an isolated and protective environment for the bird species amidst the disturbing activities of densely built cities. Concept adopts vulcanized rubber tubes with growing plants running spirally downwards to facilitate the water flow which gets collected at the bottom. The experiment was done as an attempt to blend high tech architecture and nature together but turned out only to be an utopian concept as the concern of materials were not paid importance to. More over, economic constrictions were not considered assuming humankind must come together to produce something that benefits all using all what it can offer.

== Development ==
The circular structure with plants was conceived together by Amartya Deb and Nidhi Tekwani in 2010 with mentoring and support from Nagendra Manikya, professor of architecture at Bangalore University. It was originally conceptualized to create layers and pockets of green on high rise buildings through a network of tubes and shells. In 2012, it was showcased in the International Conference on Conservation of Sparrows held at Bangalore. Adapted through a collaborative effort between zoologist Jayashankar and Deb it was argued to provide a safe haven to bird species shielding them from pollution, noise and continuous human interference.

== See also ==
- Timothy Beatley
- Urban ecology
- Biophilic design
- Ecological design
- High-tech architecture
