= Rod Sheard =

Rod Sheard is a British / Australian architect and Senior Principal at Populous.

== Early life ==
Sheard was born in Brisbane, Australia in 1951 and attended Graceville State School and Indooroopilly High School. Originally intending to pursue a career in professional tennis (he was a ball boy at the 1969 Australian Open), Sheard settled instead on working as an architect, and studied architecture at the Queensland Institute of Technology (now Queensland University of Technology).

== Career ==
His experience in sport architecture began in 1975 when he completed his studies in Australia and travelled to England, joining Howard V. Lobb and Partners, a long-established architectural practice. In 1981, after working on a number of sports projects in Nigeria and India, Sheard became a partner in the firm, and in 1993 became chairman, and changed the name of the firm to LOBB Sports Architecture.

He was responsible for a number of successful sports stadia projects throughout this period including: Galpharm Stadium in Huddersfield; the first sports stadium to win the Royal Institute of British Architect's ‘Building of the Year Award’ now known as the Stirling Prize, the Reebok Stadium in Bolton for Bolton Wanderers Football Club, and the Millennium Stadium in Cardiff (Europe's first opening roof stadium) for the Welsh Rugby Football Union. Projects abroad included: the design the ANZ stadium for the Sydney Olympic Games in 2000, Melbourne's Etihad Stadium (the first moving roof stadium in Australia) and the Westpac Stadium in Wellington, New Zealand, in collaboration with Warren and Mahoney.

In 1998 Sheard's firm- LOBB Sports Architecture- merged with HOK Sport. In 1999 he led Populous to win the competition to design the new Wembley Stadium, in collaboration with Foster + Partners. The redesign removed the stadiums two iconic towers, replacing them with the present arch. Throughout the following years Sheard led the London studio through projects such as Ascot Racecourse and the redevelopment of the All England Lawn Tennis Club at Wimbledon, including the new Centre Court's closing fabric roof.

Sheard's latest project is London's Olympic Stadium, making him the only architect to have designed two Olympic Stadiums in the modern era.

In 2002, the University of Luton conferred on Sheard the distinction of an honorary degree of Doctor of Science. He is a member of the Royal Institute of British Architects, the Royal Australian Institute of Architects and a fellow of the Royal Society of Arts.
