= USM Modular Furniture =

Swiss furniture company

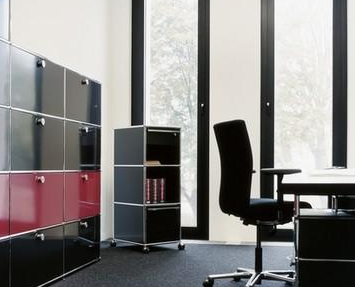
Office furniture by USM.

USM Modular Furniture is a Swiss manufacturer of modular furniture for the home and office. The company’s signature product line, USM Haller, is celebrated as a design classic and included in the permanent collection of the Museum of Modern Art and the Cooper-Hewitt National Design Museum. USM Modular Furniture employs a staff of 460 throughout Europe and the United States and is represented by more than 410 sales partners in 40 countries worldwide. USM has an international presence with furniture showrooms in Bern, Berlin, Hamburg, Düsseldorf, Munich, Paris, Stuttgart, Tokyo, and New York City. The company’s New York showroom and corporate offices are located at 28 Greene Street in SoHo.

== History ==
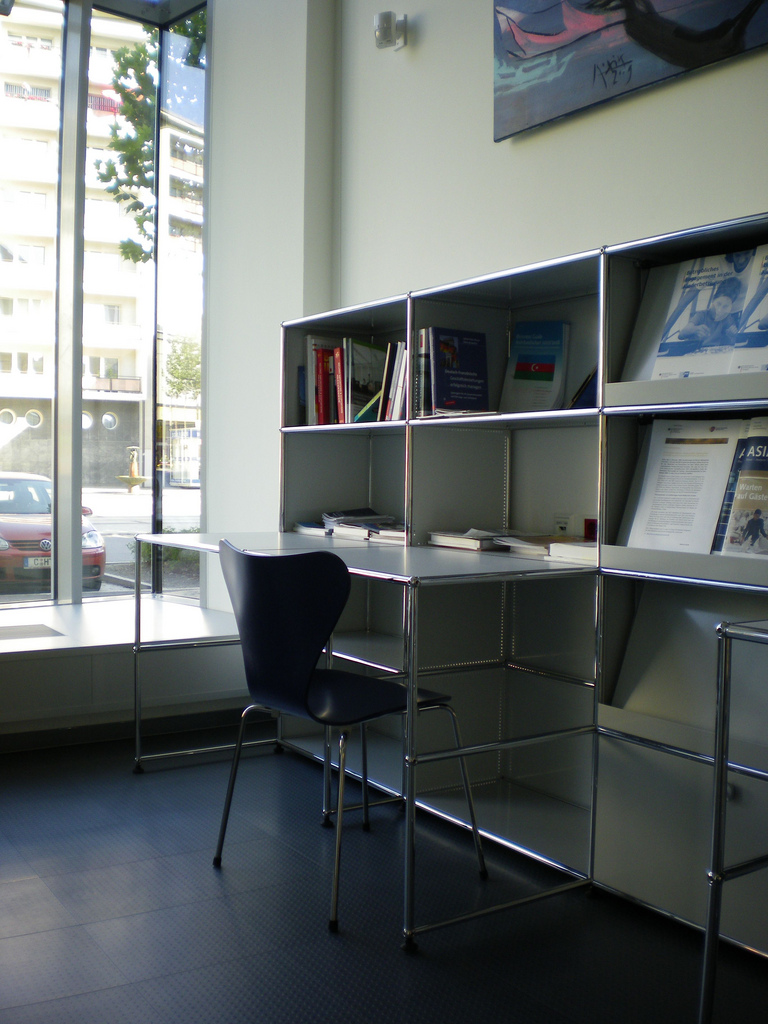
USM Haller Workstation

USM was founded in Switzerland by Ulrich Schaerer in 1885 as a producer of iron works and window fittings. In the late 1940s, USM increased its product lines with metal and sheet-metal work to respond to the post-war economy. In 1961, Paul Schaerer, grandson of USM founder Ulrich Schaerer, chose to take the company in a new direction by transforming the factory from a large, manually-oriented metal production plant into a modern, industrial enterprise. To achieve this goal, Schaerer commissioned Swiss architect Fritz Haller to design a building that would accommodate the Munsingen-based company’s factory and provide ample space for administrative offices. The building collaboration with Haller proved so successful that, in 1963, Schaerer, together with Haller, created the pioneering furniture product known today as USM Haller Systems for the company’s open-plan offices. Since the establishment of the USM Haller System, the classic furniture line has been utilized in homes and offices around the world.

== Products ==
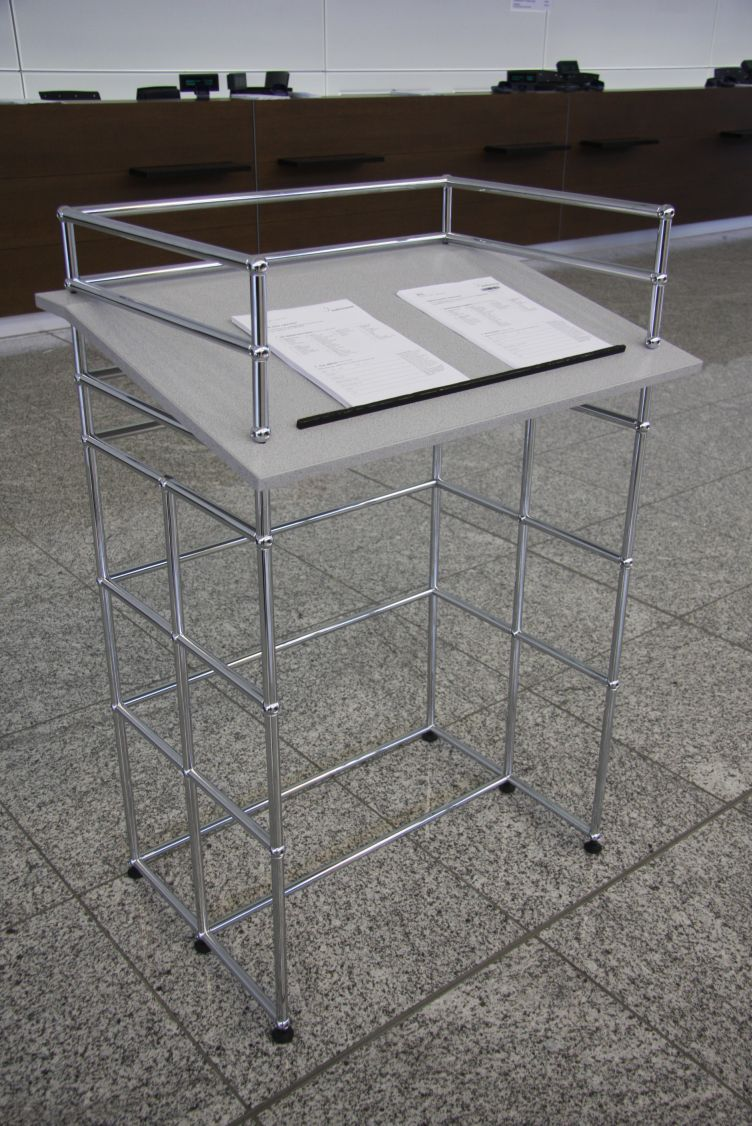
USM Haller Infostand

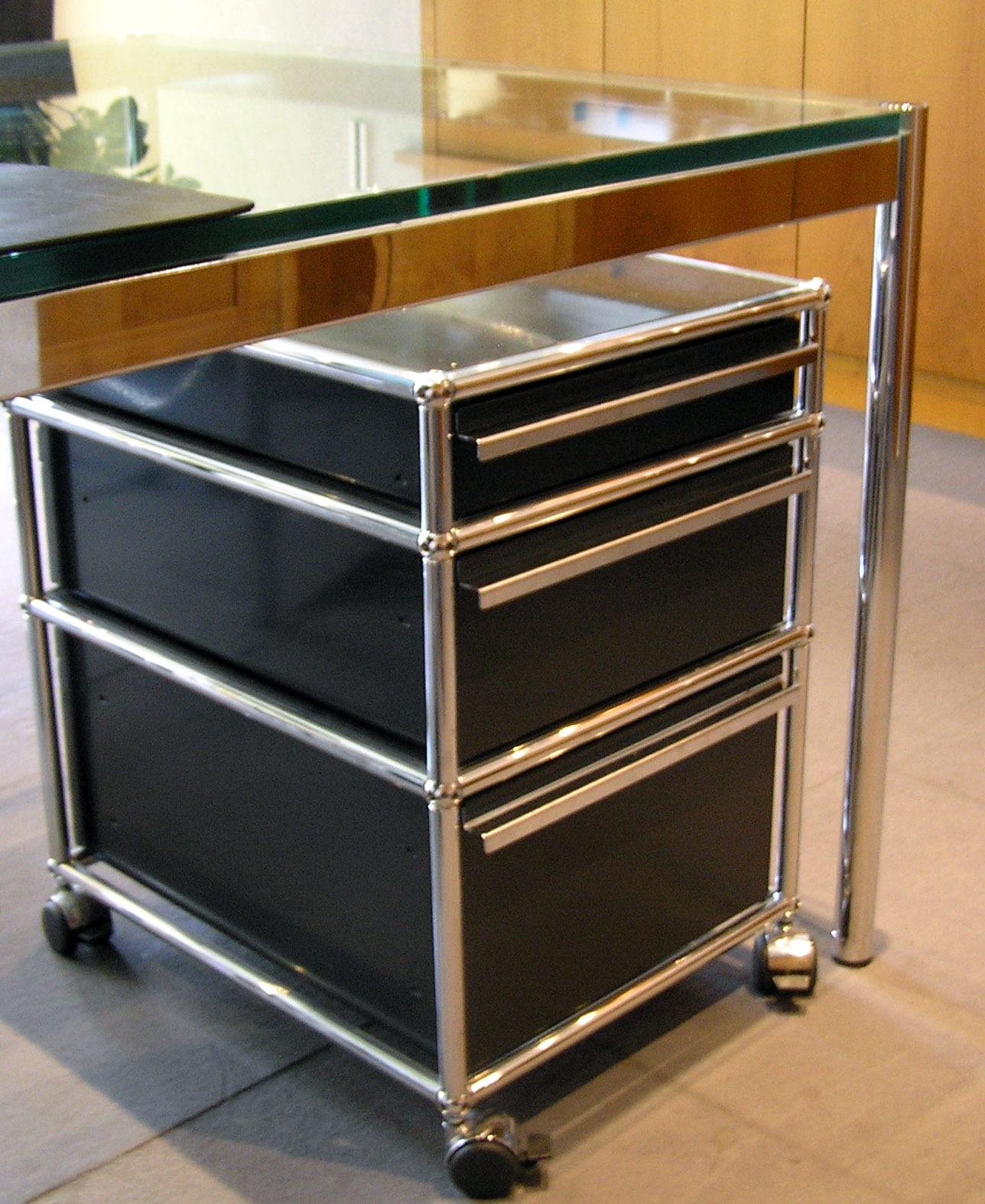
Rollcontainer by USM Modular Furniture.

USM Haller furniture systems and product lines include the USM Display presentation system (developed in 1989), the USM Kitos modular table system (1990), and the USM Inos internal organization system (1996). In 2010, USM launched its Quick Ship program to respond to increased demand for classic modern furniture pieces from the USM Haller modular system by making them available for delivery within 2–3 weeks in the Continental United States. Quick Ship represents a large selection USM pieces for the home and office, such as credenzas, shelving, tables, storage, and nightstands. These selections are in stock, pre-built, and available in seven colors.

=== USM Haller ===
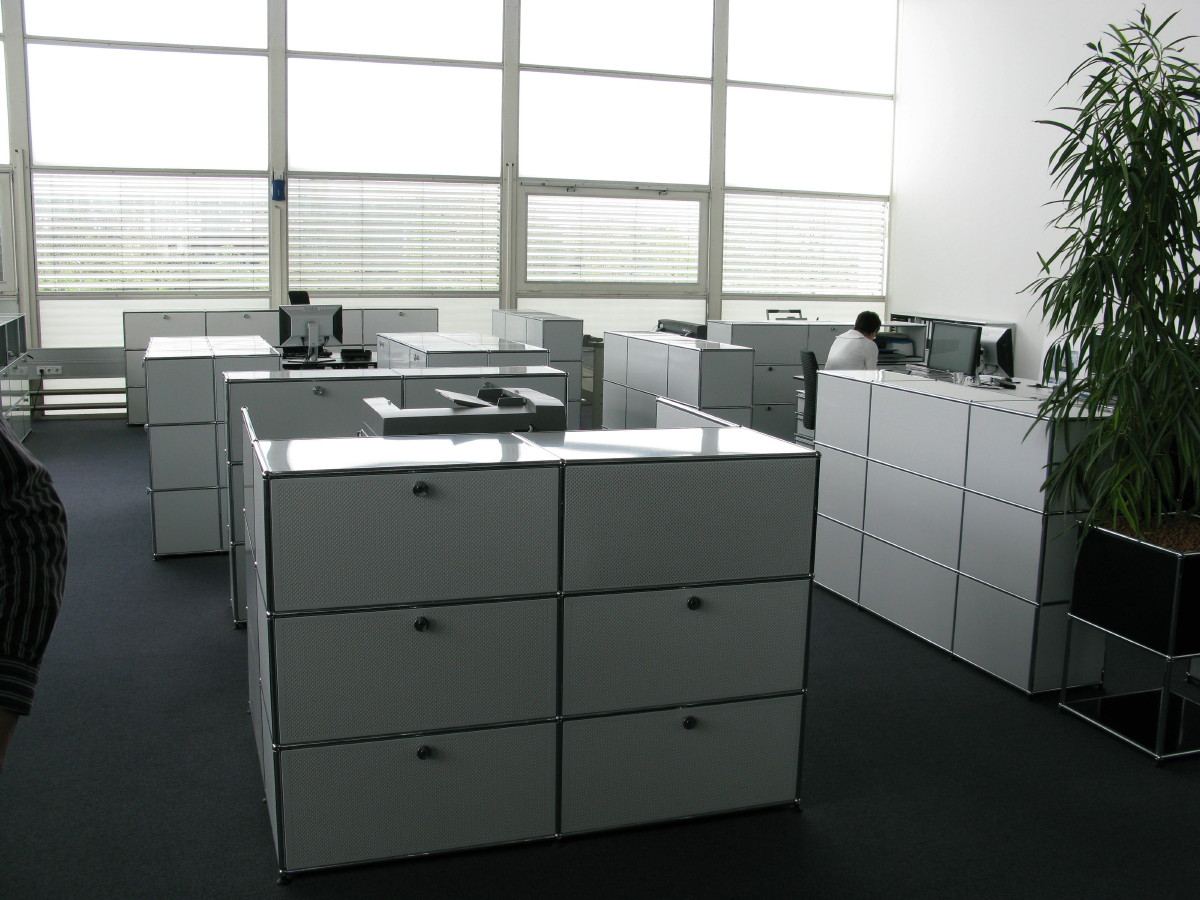
The main administration from USM Haller in Brühl, 2009

USM Haller’s elegant proportions and minimalist design is characterized by high-quality construction and simplicity that gives the modern furniture flexibility as to how it can be configured and adapt to changing needs over time. The underlying impetus behind USM Haller modular furniture is that form follows function. Each furniture system is designed to be appropriate for both home and office environments and assimilates with any architectural or interior design.

The concept of the USM Haller system is a modular freestanding desk and storage solution for the office or home. The tables are offered in standard shapes, sizes and finishes that can be accessorized with equipment for modern technology including: swing arms for telephones, monitors and computers, paper, and wire management organizers.

The USM Haller system frame is based on and constructed with three basic elements: the ball, connecting tubes and panels. The system can be built in any direction, taken apart and reconfigured for changing requirements. The furniture units can be further customized per application by adding doors, drawers and a variety of internal organizational accessories.

=== USM Kitos ===
Introduced in 1990, Kitos (Complex Integrated Table Organization System) is a highly functional modular table system that responds to the challenges of a fast paced work environment. Kitos can be transformed from a meeting table into a workstation. Its features include an adjustable column support, height and tilting work surfaces. Kitos offers a wide array of accessories: swing arms for monitors, telephones and computers, a “third level” shelf that can hold more equipment or increase a work surface and cable management. Like Haller, Kitos may be arranged in a variety of configurations.

=== USM Display ===
USM Display was introduced in 1989 and is a multi-functional partition and presentation system. The vertical supports provide the base for a variety of paneling options and organizational accessories. The system is ideal for reception, conferencing and retail purposes. Display accessories include angled or horizontal shelving, white boards and acoustic panels.
