= Reliance Controls =

American electrical equipment manufacturer based in Wisconsin

Reliance Controls Corporation
- Company type: Private
- Industry: Electrical equipment manufacturing
- Founded: 1909 in Warren, Ohio, United States
- Founder: Benjamin F. Flegel
- Headquarters: Racine, Wisconsin, United States
- Products: Time switches, transfer switches, generator accessories, power cords, plugs and connectors

Reliance Controls Corporation is an electrical products company based in Racine, Wisconsin, founded as Reliance Automatic Lighting Company in 1909 with the invention of the heavy-duty commercial time switch. The company's products include heavy duty time clocks and controls, transfer switches and transfer panels for portable generators and inverters, and generator accessories. Reliance also sells heavy duty outdoor generator power cords, outdoor remote power inlet boxes, home monitoring systems, and NEMA-style plugs and connectors.

== History ==
Reliance Automatic Lighting Company was organized in Warren, Ohio, in 1909 before moving to Racine in 1911. It was owned and operated by Benjamin F. Flegel and manufactured automatic time switches (clock apparatus for turning lights on and off at prearranged times). The automatic switches were used for store signs and windows and apartment lights; utilizing two or three circuits.

During the 1980s, Reliance shifted its focus from time switches to manual transfer switches for portable generators, which have since become its principal product line.
