= Uniklinikum Aachen =

Coordinates: 50°46′35″N 6°02′37″E

University Hospital Aachen
- RWTH Aachen University

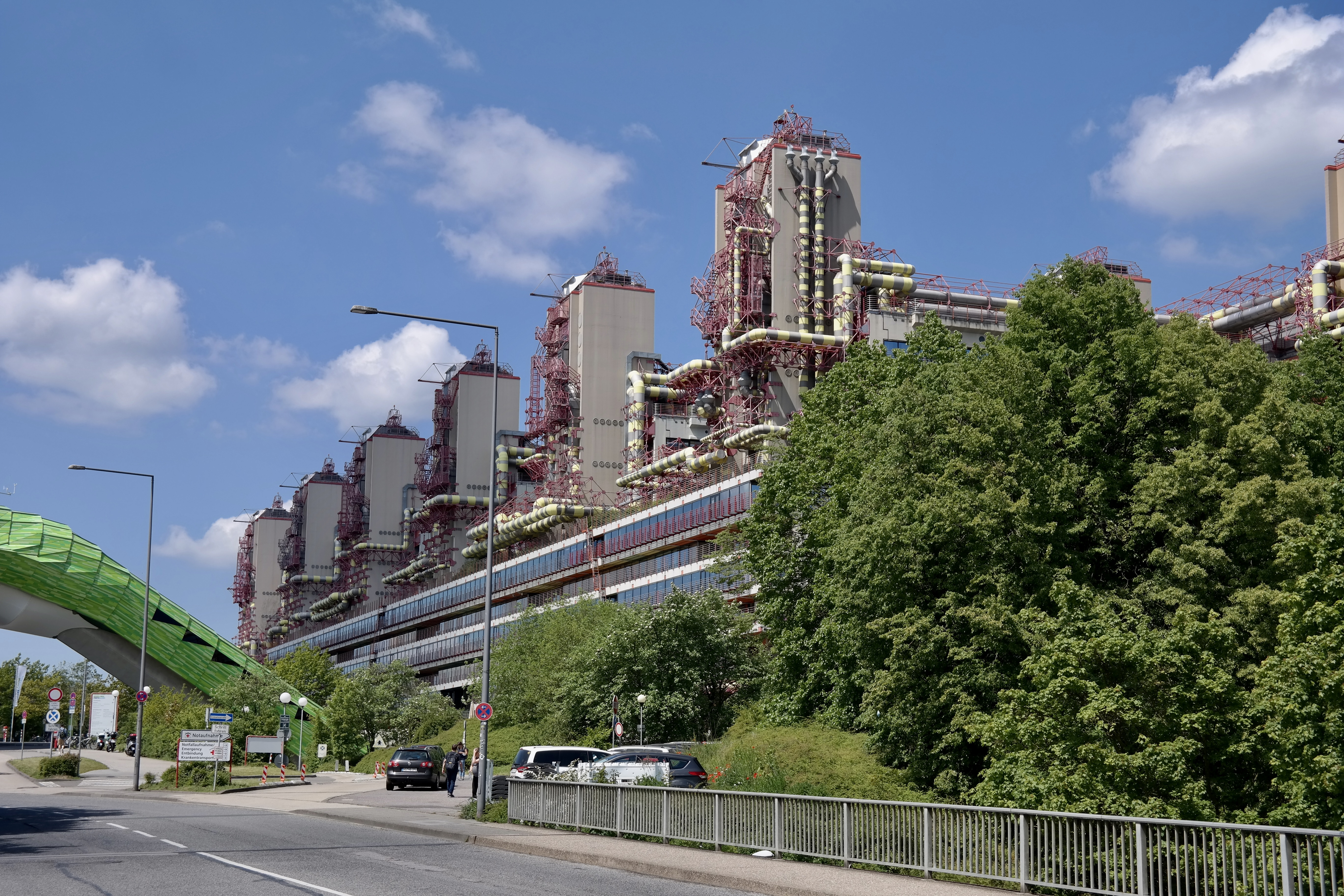
- Universitätsklinikum Aachen

Geography
- Location: Aachen, North Rhine-Westphalia, Germany

Organisation
- Type: Teaching
- Affiliated university: RWTH Aachen University

Services
- Emergency department: Yes
- Beds: 1,488

Helipads
- Helipad: Yes

History
- Founded: 1966

Links
- Website: www.ukaachen.de
- Lists: Hospitals in Germany

thumb|none|University hospital Aachen

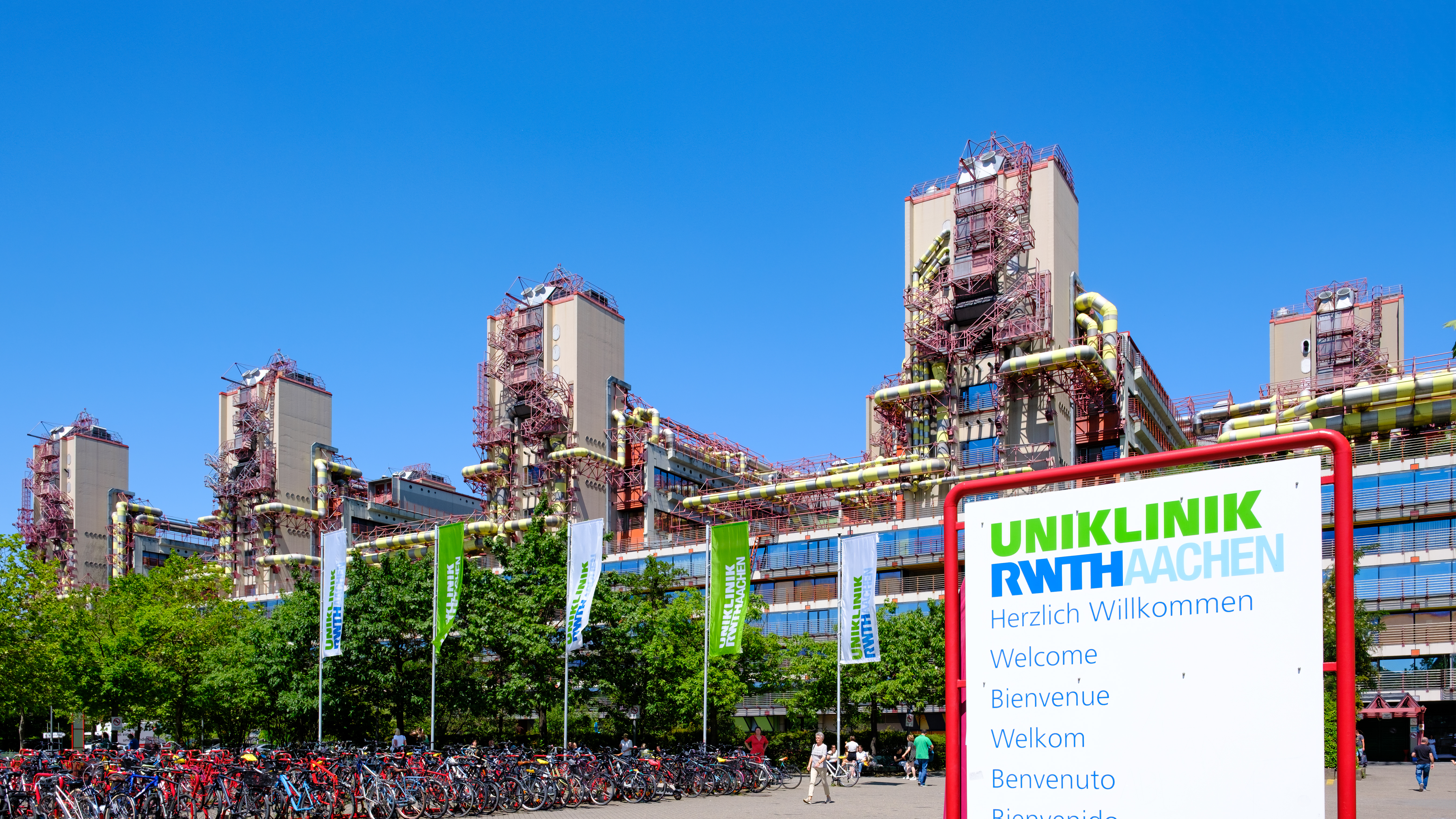
University hospital Aachen, front view

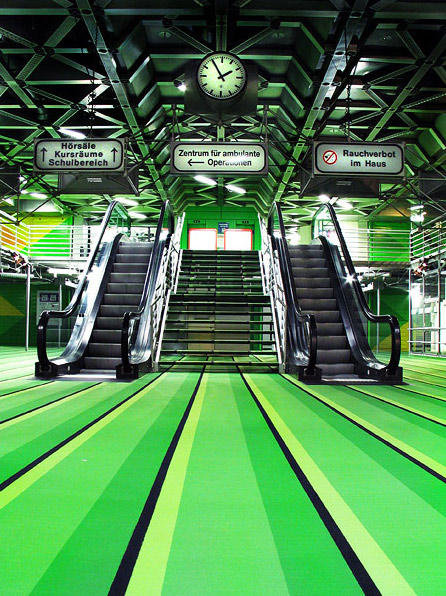
University hospital Aachen, lobby

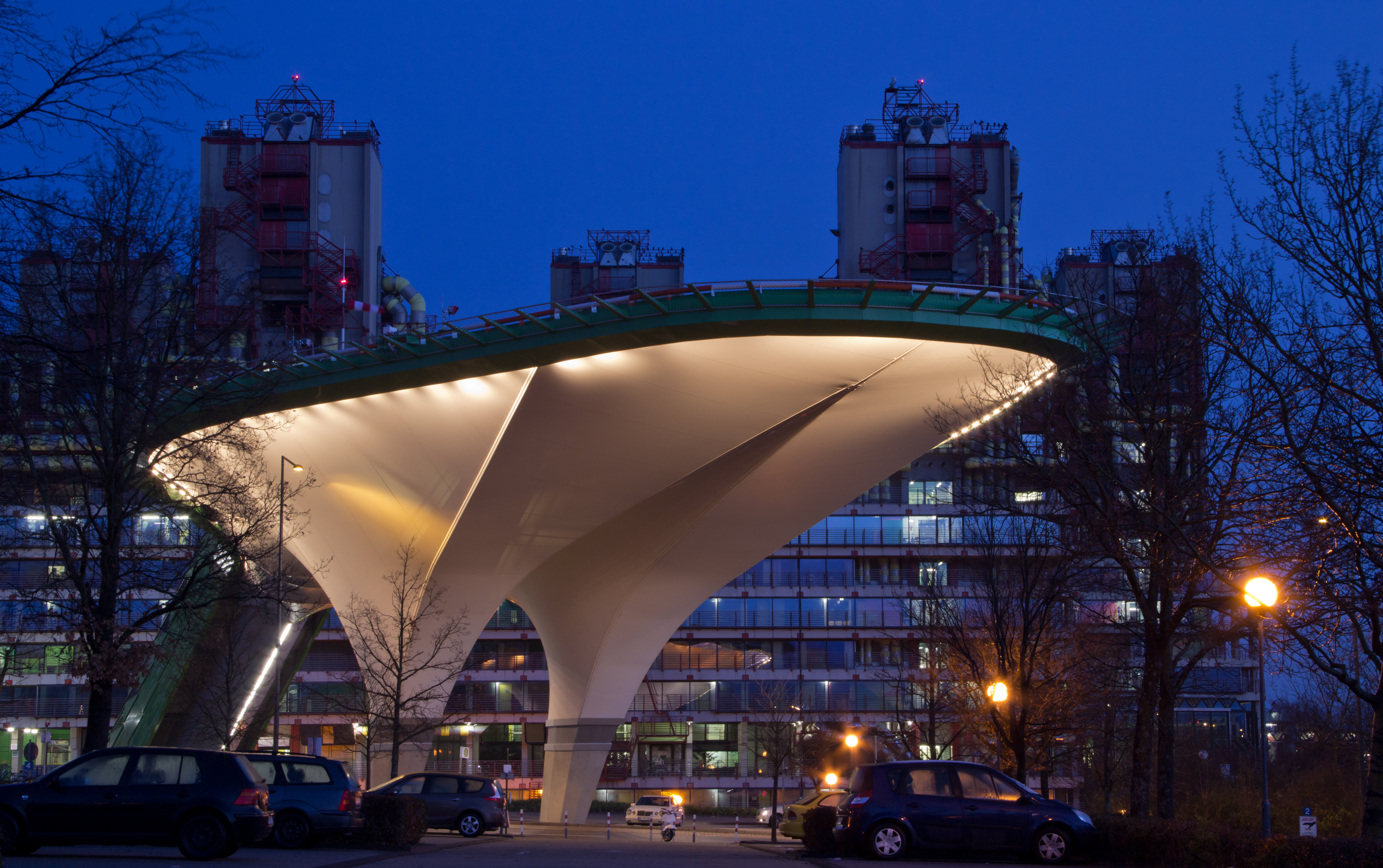
New heliport, constructed from 2010 to 2011

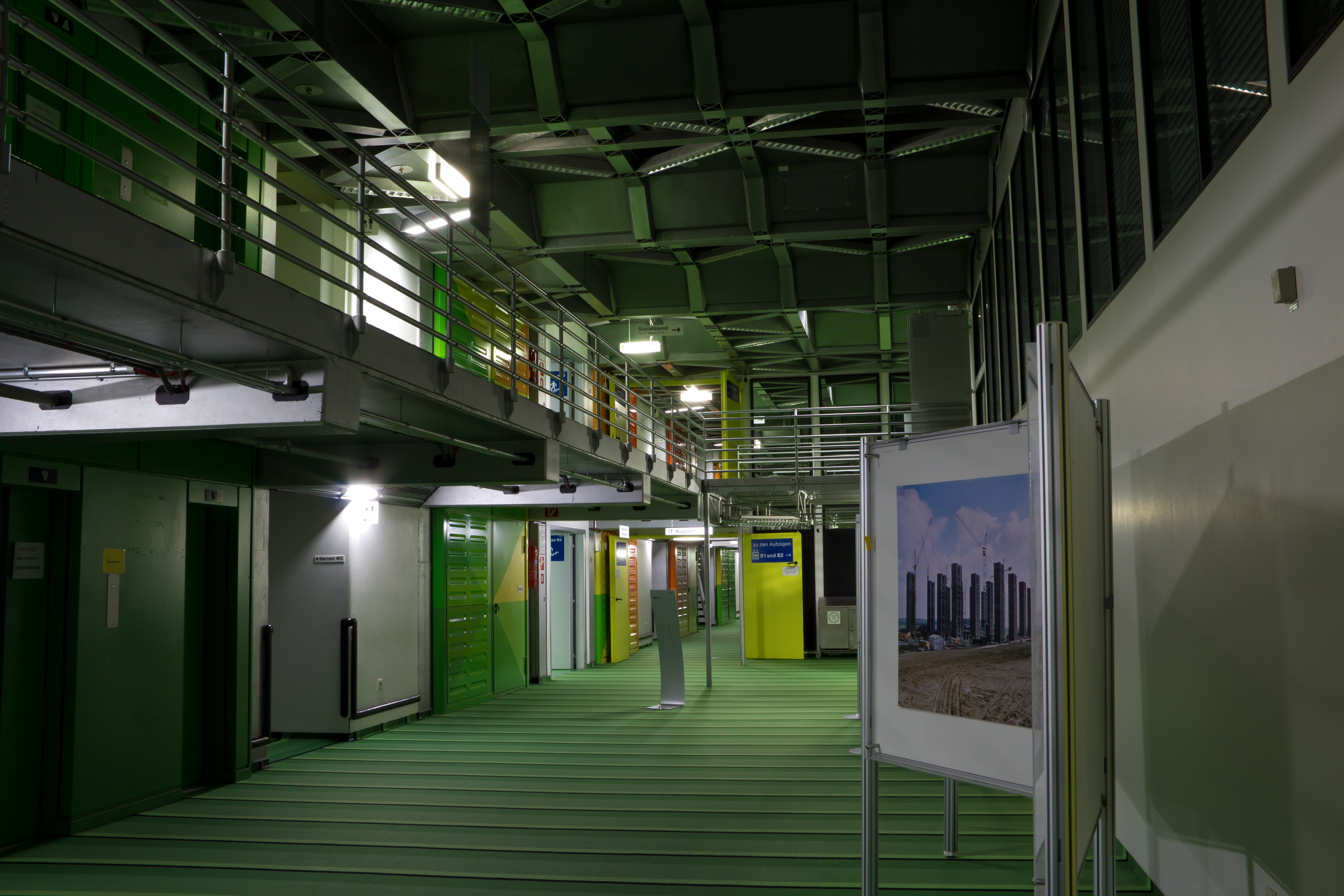
Typical design elements and colors of the building

The Uniklinikum Aachen, full German name Universitätsklinikum Aachen ("University Hospital Aachen", abbreviated UKA), formerly known as Neues Klinikum ("New Clinic"), is the university hospital of the city of Aachen, Germany, and one of the largest hospitals in Europe. It is part of the RWTH Aachen and contains its whole medical faculty.

In addition to wards and common hospital facilities such as laundry and sterilization units, the Uniklinikum Aachen houses educational and research facilities including specialized clinics, theoretical and clinical institutes, lecture halls and training rooms.

The hospital's exterior and design is a prime example of high-tech architecture.

== History ==
In 1966 the RWTH Aachen school of medicine was founded. At that time, the municipal hospitals in Aachen became university hospitals, but soon it was realized that they were too small.

In 1972 the construction of the Klinikum Aachen began, with a project of Aachen architects Weber & Brand. Ten years later, the first rooms could be used by the faculty. The rest of the building was finished section by section. The construction was delayed because of problems with soft ground that could not support the whole building.

The official opening was celebrated in 1985. Its original name was Neues Klinikum ("New Clinic") because there was already a hospital called Klinikum in Aachen at that time; it does not exist anymore.

== Facts and figures ==
Annual inpatients	39,055 (2023)
Annual outpatients	199,233 (2023)
Doctors	927 (2023)
Professors	67
Scientific staff	1200
Non-scientific staff	5000
Clinics	35
Institutes	37
Rooms	6600
Elevators	30 (3×6 + 6×2 + 1 (working) for outpatients)
Escalators	2 at the entrance
