= 22 St Peter's Square =

Building in Hammersmith, London, England

Coordinates: 51.4911°N 0.2446°W

22 St Peter's Square, in Hammersmith, London, is a grade II listed building with a former laundry that has been converted to an architects' studio and office building. The property is situated in the western corner of St Peter's Square, that was laid out and built from 1827, opposite St Peter's Church, Hammersmith. In the basement of the rear of the building is the former studio of Island Records known as The Fallout Shelter, 47 British Grove. Many musicians began their careers or recorded in the building, including Steve Winwood and Traffic, Robert Palmer, Cat Stevens, Bob Marley, U2, Nick Drake, Johnny Thunders and Sandy Denny. It has a Hammersmith Society Conservation award plaque (2009) and has been included in tours in Architecture Week.

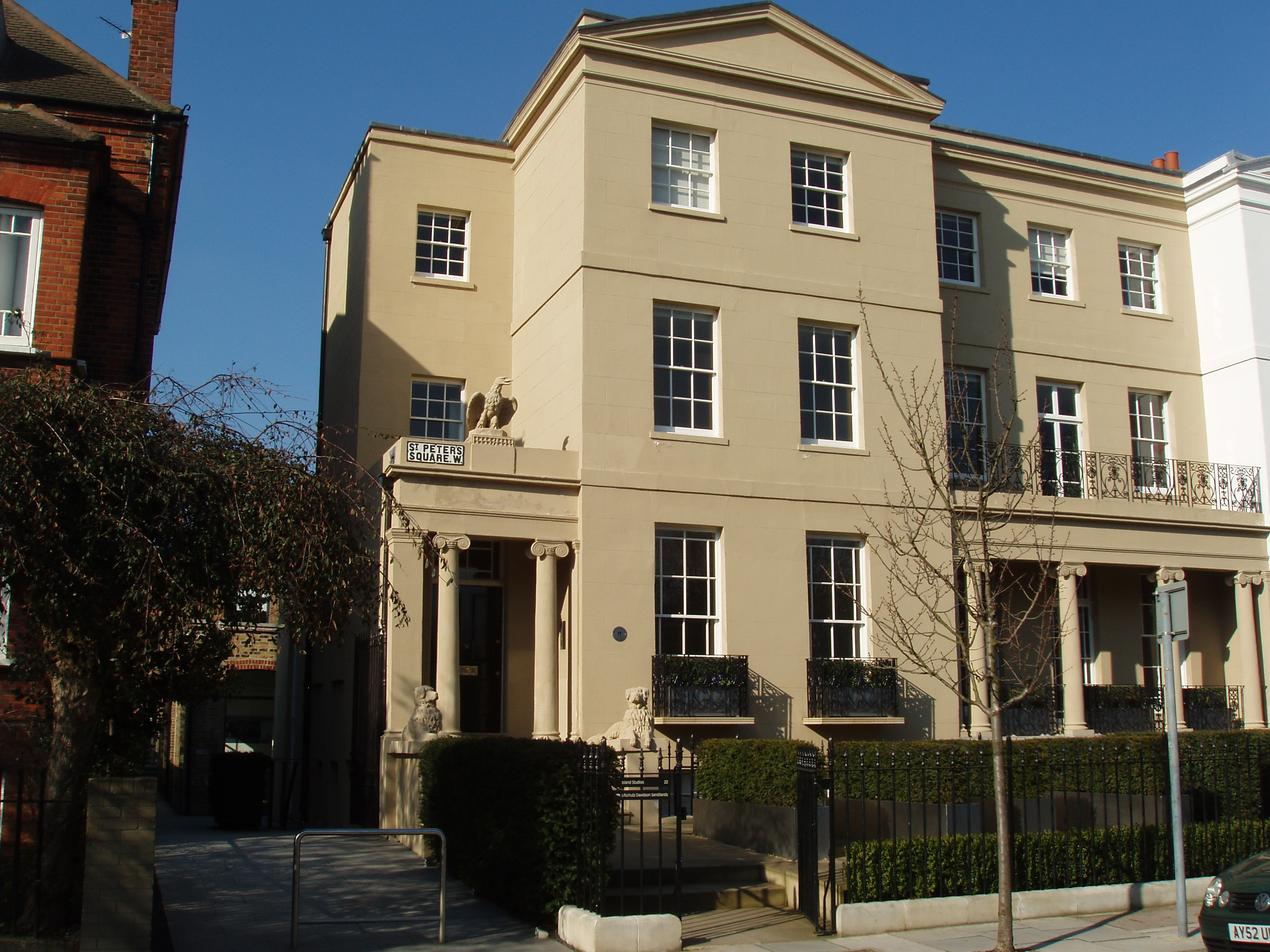
The front building of 22 St Peter's Square

== History ==
Number 22, unlike the predominant pattern of housing in St Peter's Square, consists of a trio of linked houses, each of three stories plus basement, the only example of this layout in the square. The center part is recessed, with a projecting Ionic colonnade to the ground floor forming a balcony to the raised ground floor, and this has a cast-iron balustrade in the 'Heart and Honeysuckle' Anthemion pattern. The houses on either side have two bays projecting beneath a pediment. Their outermost bays are recessed and have projecting porches with Ionic columns. The entrance to No. 22 retains the original eagle statue (of plaster or composite stone) on the porch. Paired statues of dogs sit on the piers flanking the steps up to the front door. Until the 1890s the large private garden at the rear of the house was laid out as a long rectangular lawn bordered by shrubs and trees, with an open field to the South.

== Royal Chiswick Laundry ==
By 1894 the garden was completely covered by laundry buildings. The Royal Chiswick Laundry Western Dying and Cleaning Works was constructed behind the house fronting British Grove, a lane to the rear. The laundry buildings consist of two long sheds running almost the full length of the former garden. They are of London stock brick with red brick window arches under slate roofs, with glazed skylights running along the roof ridges.

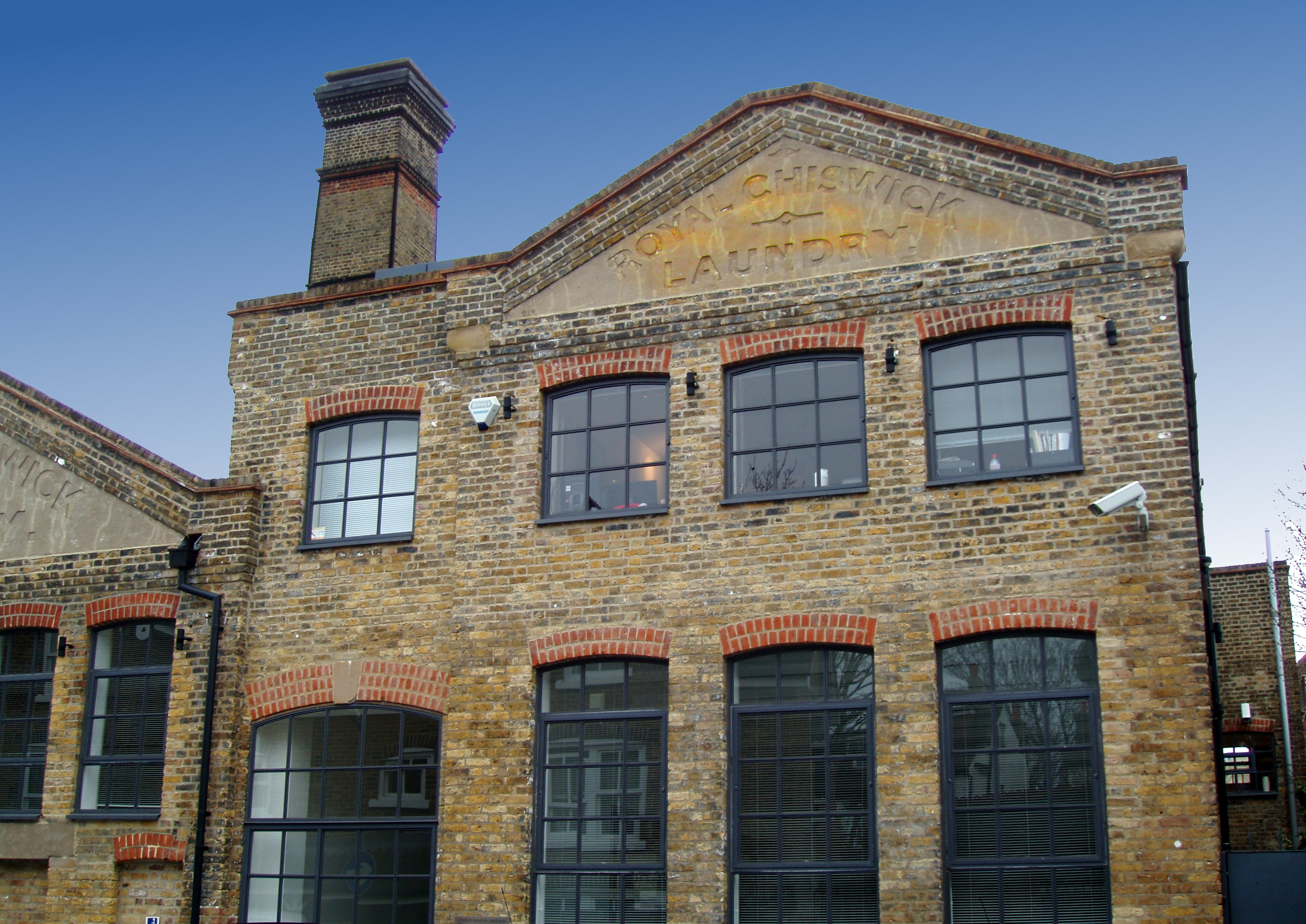
The former Royal Chiswick Laundry building at the rear 22 St Peter's Square, Hammersmith

In 1929 John Piper the artist (b 1903) lived in a flat at 22 St Peter's Square and then by the 1940s the house and laundry was owned by the then Mayor of Hammersmith, Alderman Sir Marshall Hays JP (b 1872). The laundry closed in 1968, then the buildings were for a time occupied by a company that added soundtrack to film before the property became the offices, recording studios and premises of Island Records, who moved in with a staff of 65.

== Island Records ==
In 1973, the property became the offices, recording studios and premises of Island Records, who moved in with a staff of 65. The house became the administrative offices of the company, where the legal and finance staff worked, while the former laundry buildings were the offices for the A&R, production, marketing, promotion and sales departments. The basement was converted into a small recording studio, called the Fallout Shelter with its entrance at 47 British Grove, incorporating the base of the chimney, which was occasionally used in recordings to add reverberation (echo) to vocals. The recording studio, was described by Chris Blackwell, the founder of Island Records, as 'the little one in the back of Island Records at 47 British Grove.' With the sound of recording sessions continuing late into the night, members of staff sleeping on the premises, the comings and goings of musicians, staff and visitors, the use of their parking spaces, and the noise all this made, caused friction between Island Records and some local residents. There was also a canteen above the studio. The roster of musicians recording on the Island label at this time included reggae artists Bob Marley and the Wailers who recorded some tracks for Exodus there, Toots and the Maytals, A Special Moment (Tot Taylor) Aswad and Steel Pulse. The 'non reggae' Island artists include Cat Stevens, Robert Palmer and Steve Winwood (working with the Spencer Davis Group and Traffic, and as a solo artist), Grace Jones, Tom Waits, Melissa Etheridge, Amy Winehouse and P J Harvey and their most successful signing, the Irish band U2.

== Island Studios ==
In 2005 Frost Meadowcroft acquired the property on behalf of Lifschutz Davidson Sandilands architects from Universal Music for £4.1m. The architects then proceeded to return the laundry sheds to their original open plan and restored most of the metal-framed windows to their nineteenth-century proportions. Historically significant features of the laundry, such as the boiler chimney and the incised lettering in the gable overlooking British Grove, have been retained and restored. Both these companies now occupy the space as studios and offices together with Nick Stewart & Associates. In recognition of its heritage the building is now called Island Studios.

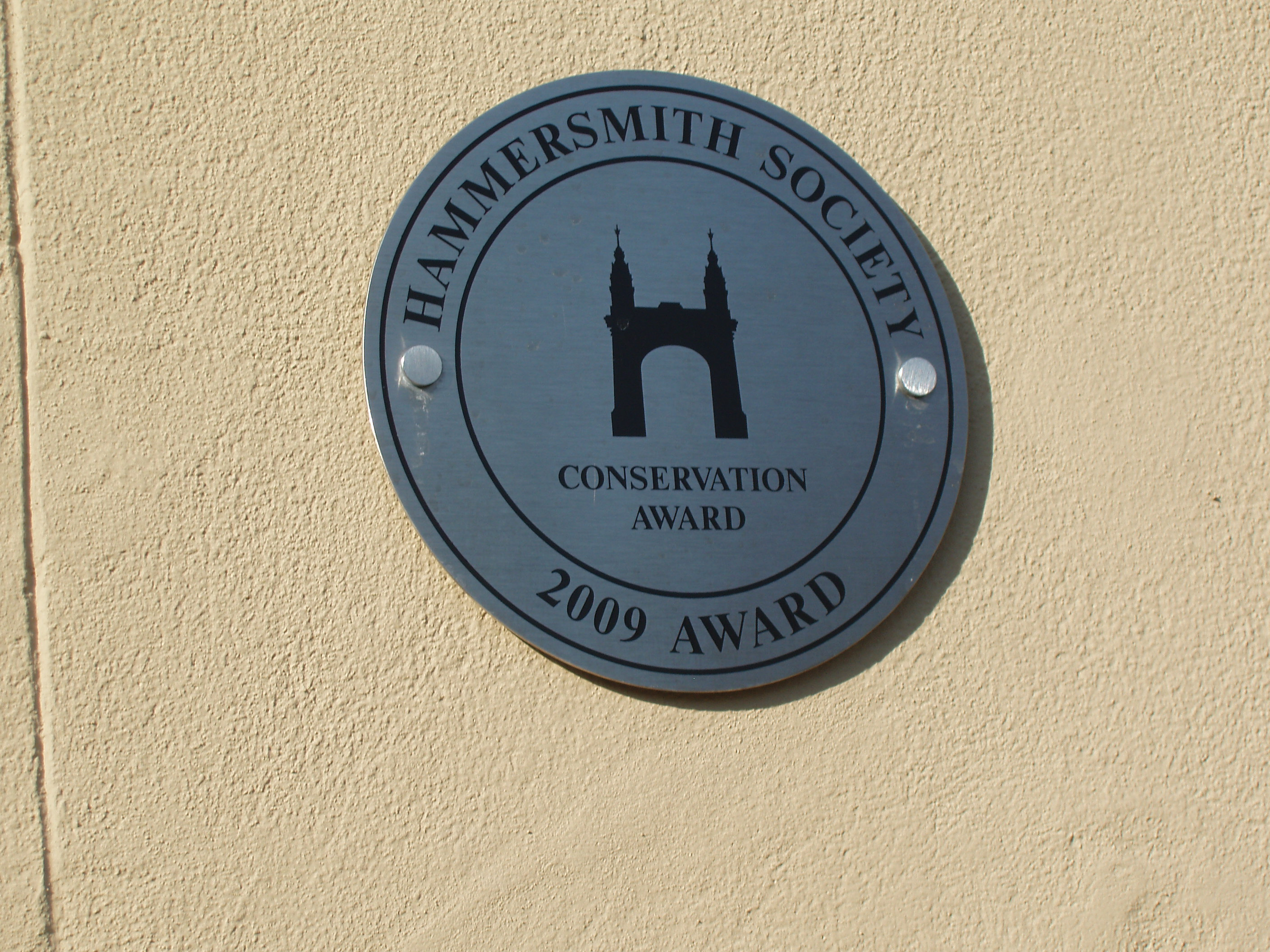
The Hammersmith Society Conservation Award Plaque on the front building of 22 St Peter's Square
