= Thames Wharf Studios =

Development in Hammersmith, London

Coordinates: 51.48379°N 0.22413°W

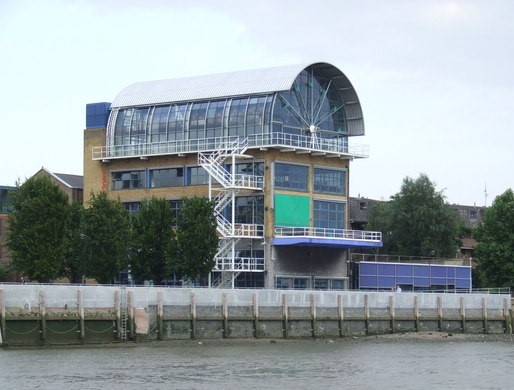
Thames Wharf Studios in July 2011

Thames Wharf Studios, in Hammersmith, London, was originally an industrial site containing the Duckham's oil facility overlooking the River Thames in Hammersmith. It was acquired by the Richard Rogers Partnership in 1983, which converted the industrial complex of redundant 20th century warehouses into offices, workshops, housing and a restaurant.

== History ==
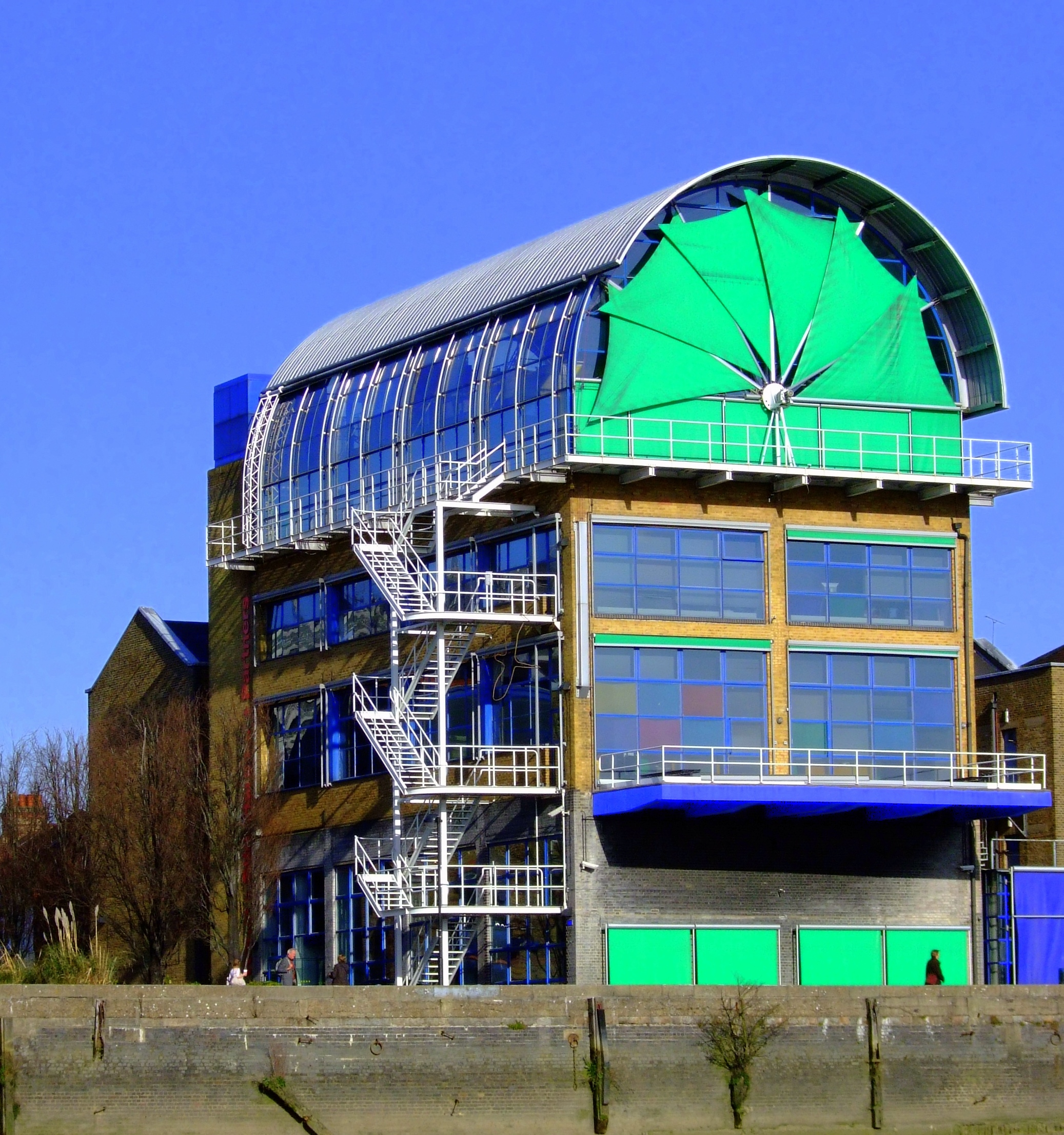
Thames Wharf Studios in April 2009

Duckham was founded by Alexander Duckham in 1899 and established a good reputation in the field of lubrication for industrial machinery and motor vehicles. By the early 1920s, the Duckham range of oils was officially recommended by more than 60 British car manufacturers. Production and product research had started with 10 men at a small works in Millwall. The company moved to Hammersmith in 1921, and major expansions occurred in 1940 and 1948. Another works was established in Birmingham during World War II, and by the late 1960s Duckham had become the largest selling brand of motor oil in the country. The company was bought by BP in 1970, and the works at Thames Wharf were closed in 1979.

The site was developed as architectural practice offices, lettable workshops and office units (within the refurbished warehouse blocks) and new housing. The Richard Rogers office's double-height entrance lobby has been developed as an informal gallery where project models are exhibited on steel racks. Throughout the building new elements are expressed in a bold industrial manner, often using primary colours. On the ground floor of the site is The River Café, which opened in 1987. The café looks out over a private landscaped area that extends to the river walkway. The two-storey rooftop extension to the office space, shaped like a 'bread bin', was designed by Lifschutz Davidson Sandilands, an architectural practice that had offices in the Thames Wharf complex but has since moved to Island Studios, 22 St Peter's Square. Completed in 1991, the extension's great semi-circular roof provides a lightweight expression of the activities carried out below.

== Present day ==
Founder partner of the Richard Rogers Partnership and RIBA past president, Marco Goldschmied sold his share of the freehold interest in 2010. The remainder of the freeholds have been owned since 2007 by two Guernsey companies and a pension fund which acquired John Young and Richard Rogers' share of the freehold interests in 2007. Rogers Stirk Harbour + Partners, formerly the Richard Rogers Partnership, remain as tenants, as do The River Café.

In 2009, the first floor office space was let by Thames Wharf Studios's consultants, Frost Meadowcroft, to Pokémon the video and card game company. Other current tenants include Green Dot Ltd, the UK subsidiary of Grüne Punkt GmbH, a Europe wide waste recycling company, Clicked Creative Ltd, a digital media company, international law firms McAllister Olivarius and HRO Grant Dawe LLP.
