= Umbrella Magazine =

Men's online magazine

- Umbrella Magazine Issue 1 cover
- Editor: Anthony Teasdale
- Art Director: Matt Reynolds
- Categories: Men's magazines
- Frequency: Quarterly
- First issue: 2010
- Country: United Kingdom
- Based in: London
- Language: English
- Website: www.umbrellamagazine.co.uk

Umbrella Magazine was a British magazine focusing on cities, with an emphasis on design, style and culture. The co-founders were Anthony Teasdale and Matt Reynolds. Teasdale is a journalist who has written for Arena, Esquire and FHM Reynolds is a creative director who works in advertising. The magazine ran for 16 issues before going on hiatus in 2020. Freelance contributors include Kevin Sampson (writer), author of Awaydays and Powder, John Mackin, writer of the book, Redman, A Season On the Drink, Brett Foraker, an advertising film director who works for Ridley Scott's advertising company RSA and Architecture correspondent Justin Clack, director of property consultants Frost Meadowcroft.

== History ==
Issue 1 of Umbrella Magazine was launched in 2010 and included articles on a look back at 1990 The Stone Roses, Poll Tax Riots, Italia '90 (1990 FIFA World Cup) and subject matter such as classic Indian match boxes and evolution to the Aphex Twin to how to cook a perfect steak. In Issue 2, Anthony Teasdale writes on how technology killed rock ’n’ roll... and gave birth to the ‘experience society’ and Justin Clack writes on five new buildings that will change London's skyline for good, including the Shard London Bridge, Lifschutz Davidson Sandilands's Charlotte Building in Gresse Street, London and One Hyde Park, Knightsbridge. In issue 4 Justin Clack writes an essay on the history of the Westway (London) and Frestonia and in issue 6 he writes on Dagenham Ford whilst Jason Burke British author and journalist writes about his book 9/11 wars.
