= Kevin Sampson (writer) =

British novelist

Kevin Sampson is a British novelist, best known for his novels Awaydays (1998), Powder (1999) and Stars Are Stars (2006). He lives in Birkenhead, Merseyside. His crime thriller, The Killing Pool, was published by Cape on 21 March 2013.

== Career ==
Sampson began writing gig reviews for NME in the 80s, though was famously sacked by editor Neil Spencer for reviewing a Sex Gang Children concert at a Liverpool club that had been burned down on the night the band had been due to appear. He went on to contribute regularly to The Face, Arena, i-D, Sounds, Jamming, The Observer and Time Out before joining Channel 4 as an assistant editor for Youth Programmes.

He left C4 to set up Kinesis Films, a company that specialised in documentaries about subcultures (notably Sole of the Nation, a film about Dr. Martens boots, and Ibiza - A Short Film About Chilling). Sampson returned to Merseyside in 1990 to help long-time friend Peter Hooton set up Produce Records with partners Ian Croft, Wayne Chand, Barney Moores and Paul McKenna. Produce enjoyed a string of Top 40 hits in the early 1990s, including The Farm's "Groovy Train" and "All Together Now".

When The Farm broke up in 1994, Sampson dug out the manuscript to a novella he had sent to Penguin in 1982. Awaydays was based on what he saw during his youth, travelling to, and at, football grounds up and down the country. Inspired by Irvine Welsh's debut Trainspotting, Sampson re-worked the novel, which was acquired by publisher Dan Franklin at Jonathan Cape. Awaydays was an immediate critical and commercial success on its release in 1998. Sampson's second novel, Powder, reflects some of his experiences of the music business with The Farm and Produce Records, and subsequent adventures in Ibiza, and working for Richard Branson's V2 Music.

Awaydays was adapted to film in 2009. He writes about his involvement in the Ibiza film A Short Film About Chilling in the Summer 2010 Umbrella Magazine's Issue 1 and a film version of Powder was released August 2011. Surveillance, a film from one of Sampson's original screenplays, was in competition at the Berlinale's "Panorama" section in 2008, and his forthcoming crime thriller Gangsterland is under option with Red Union Films.

In January 2018, Sampson was hired to pen new mini-series Anne, produced by ITV Studios owned World Productions' for ITV, which centres on Anne Williams' crusade for justice after the death of her son Kevin in the Hillsborough disaster of 1989.

On the 21 April 2022, ITV announced that filming had started on the 3 episode drama series The Hunt for Raoul Moat. It's again being produced by World Productions for ITV1. It's written by Sampson, stars Lee Ingleby as Detective Chief Superintendent Neil Adamson, and Matt Stokoe as Raoul Moat.

== Novels ==
- Awaydays (1998)
- Powder (1999)
- Leisure (2000)
- Outlaws (2001)
- Clubland (2002)
- Freshers (2003)
- Stars are Stars (2006)
- Extra Time (2012)
- The Killing Pool (2013)
- The House on the Hill (2014)
