= Black Lion Lane =

Street in Hammersmith, London

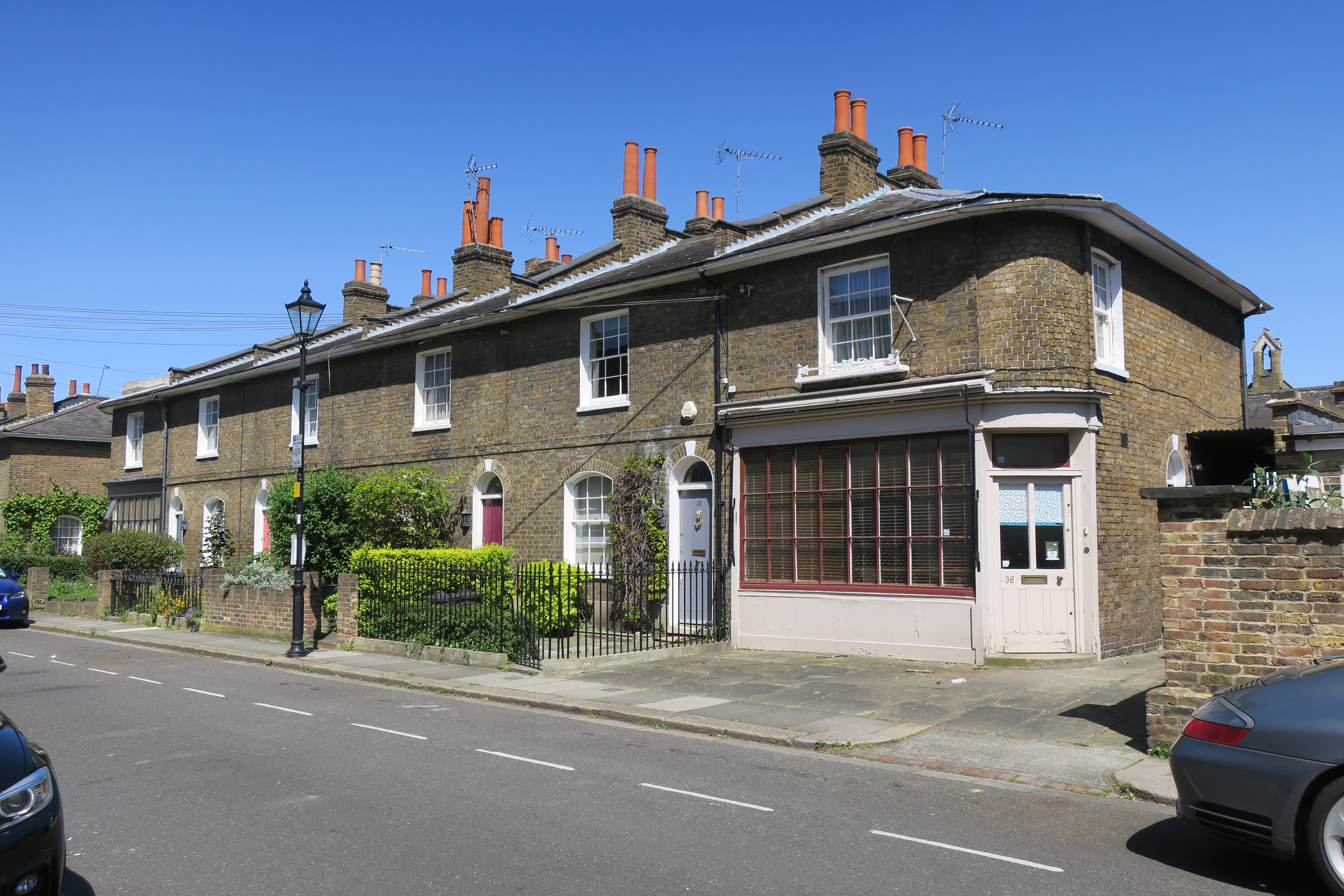
Historic houses in Black Lion Lane

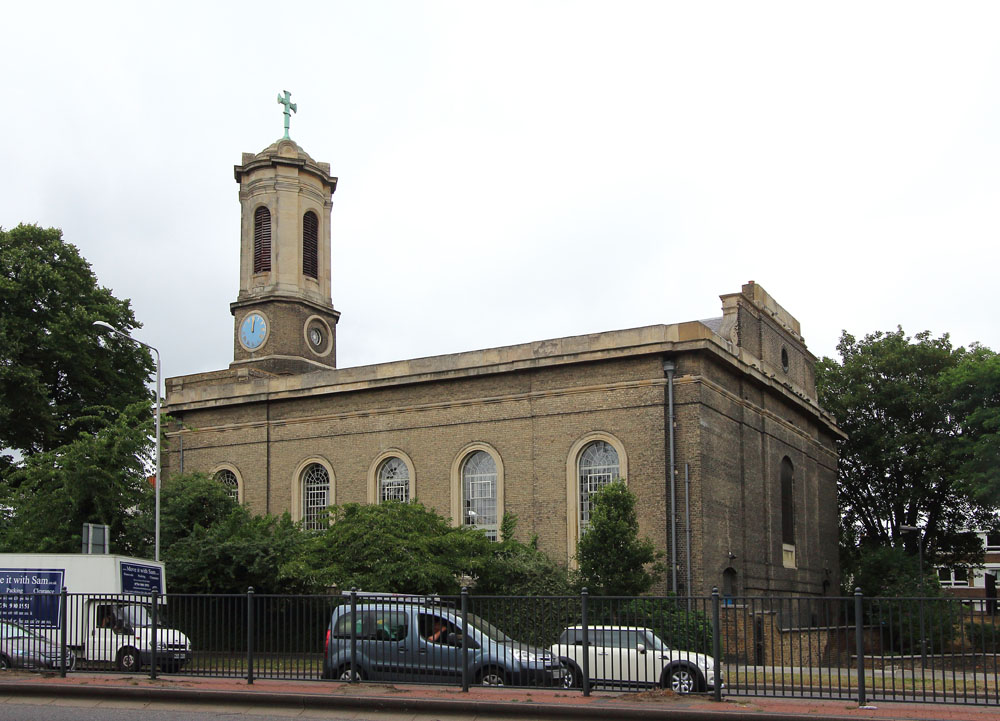
The 1829 St Peter's Church in Black Lion Lane, gave its name to the square to its east

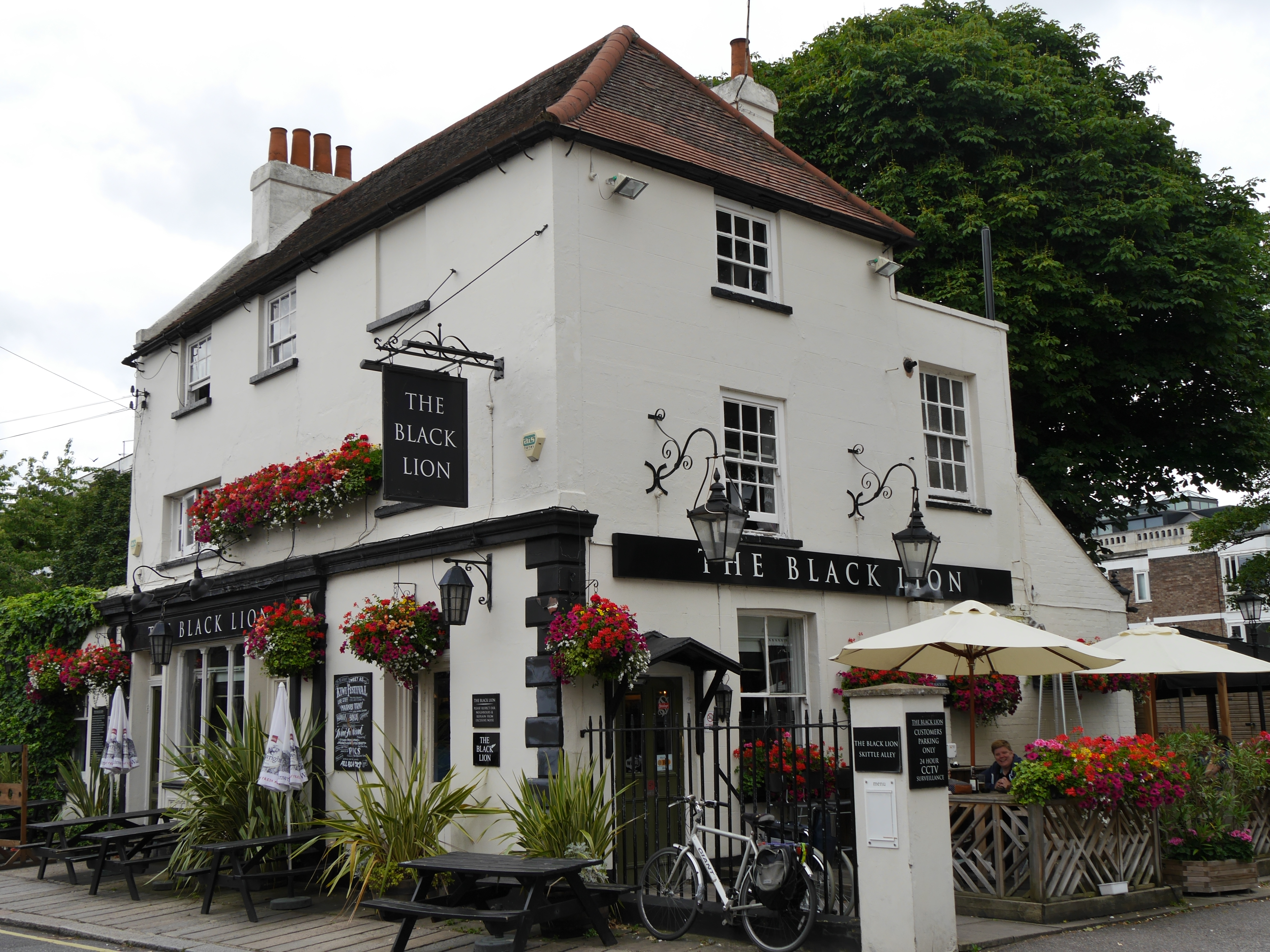
The Black Lion which gives the street its name.

Black Lion Lane is a street in Hammersmith in London running north to south from King Street and finishing by the River Thames. Today located in the London Borough of Hammersmith and Fulham, the street takes its name from the Black Lion pub on the riverfront not far from Chiswick Mall. Hammersmith Terrace runs eastwards off it.

Many of the houses date back to the early nineteenth century. The Anglican St Peter's Church opened in the lane in 1829. The Regency era St Peter's Square, laid out in the 1820s, is directly to the west of the lane. The Victorian Westcroft Square is to the north of the lane across King Street. The lane was intersected by the Great West Road in the 1930s and the severed southern end nearest to the Thames (including the Black Lion pub) is now known as South Black Lion Lane. A number of the buildings are now listed. The Cross Keys pub is located in the street.

The street became a centre of media attention in 1994. On 7 February that year, the recently elected Conservative MP for Eastleigh, Stephen Milligan, who lived at No. 64, had failed to appear in the House of Commons as expected. His secretary Vera Taggart went to look for him, only to find him dead in the house. His dead body was found naked except for a pair of stockings and suspenders, with an electrical flex tied around his neck, his head covered and an orange in his mouth.

The pathology report into Milligan's death discounted the possibility of murder, lending weight to the belief that he died as a result of suicide or, more likely, died accidentally from autoerotic asphyxiation. No drugs or alcohol were found in his blood, and no substances were found to have contributed to his death. The coroner concluded that he had died in the early hours of February 7th (on the same day his body was found), and ruled it a death by misadventure.
