= Royal Victoria Dock Bridge =

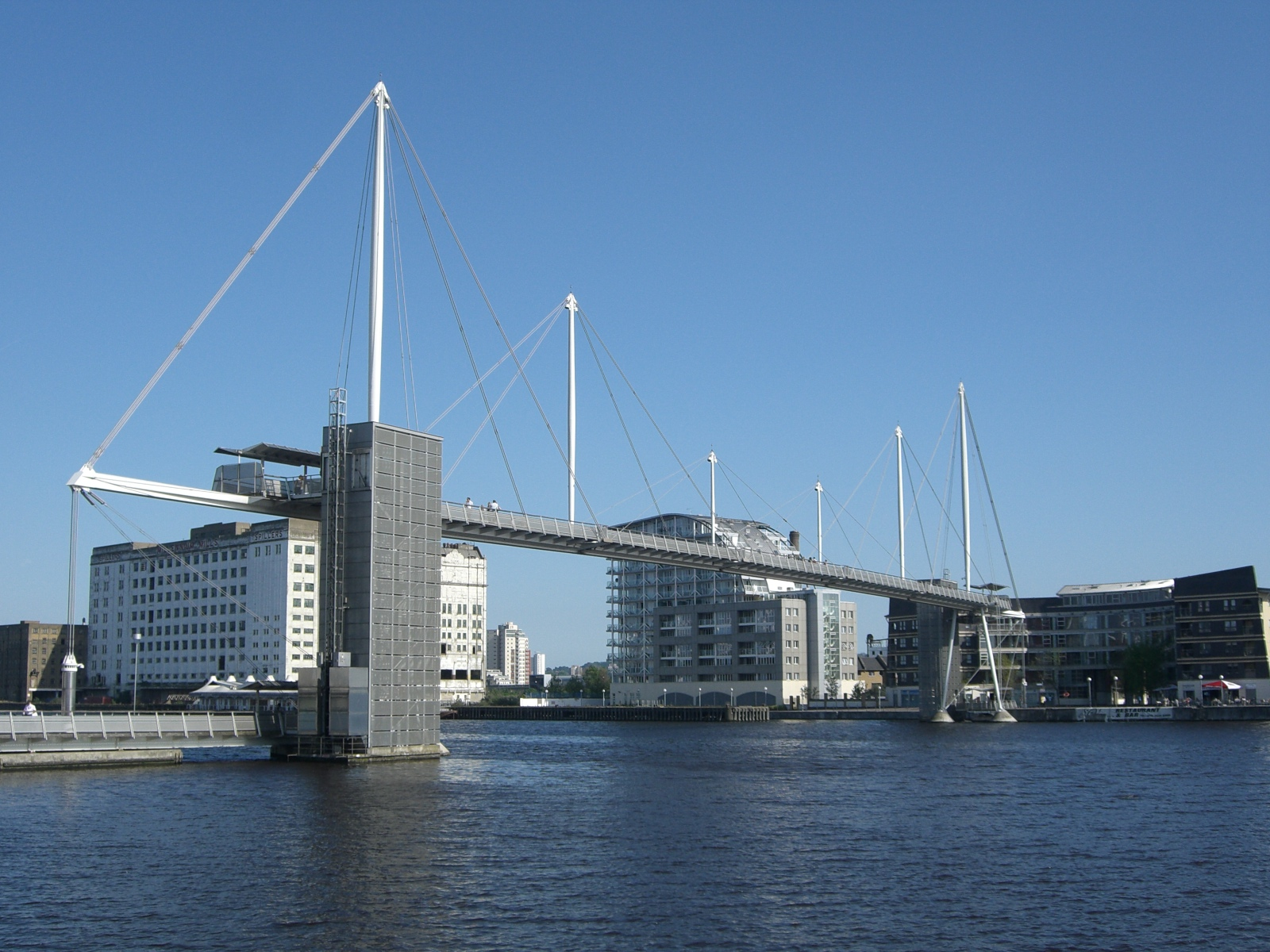
- Royal Victoria Dock Bridge crossing the Royal Victoria Dock
- Coordinates: 51°30′23″N 0°01′34″E
- Carries: Pedestrians
- Crosses: Royal Victoria Dock
- Locale: Docklands, London, England
- Official name: Royal Victoria Dock Bridge

Characteristics
- Design: Cable-stayed bridge
- Total length: 127.5 m (418 ft)

History
- Architect: Lifschutz Davidson Sandilands
- Opened: 1998

The Royal Victoria Dock Bridge is a signature high-level footbridge crossing the Royal Victoria Dock in the Docklands area of east London designed by London-based architects and designers Lifschutz Davidson Sandilands. The bridge provides a direct link from Eastern Quay and Britannia Village, a residential development to the south of the dock, to the ExCeL Exhibition Centre and Custom House station, both situated to the north of the dock.

The bridge takes the form of an inverted Fink truss, with six masts rising above the deck at 25.5 m (84 ft) centres, varying in height from almost 30 m (100 ft) at each end to just 10.6 m (35 ft) for the smallest masts. The shape of the bridge is designed to reflect the masts of the sailing boats which use the dock. The bridge crosses the dock with a clearance of some 15 m (50 ft) above the water, a height which was necessary to allow yachts to pass below the bridge deck. The bridge is accessed at each end by stairs. There was formerly lift access, however the lifts were poorly designed for this situation and have now been taken permanently out of commission as a result of neverending reliability issues. There is a possibility of replacement but no timeline has been set.

The bridge was completed in 1998, at a cost of £5 million. A second construction stage envisaged in the bridge's design involves the addition of a glass passenger cabin travelling on a rail of the underside of the deck to make this a transporter bridge.

== Gallery ==
Royal Victoria Dock Bridge
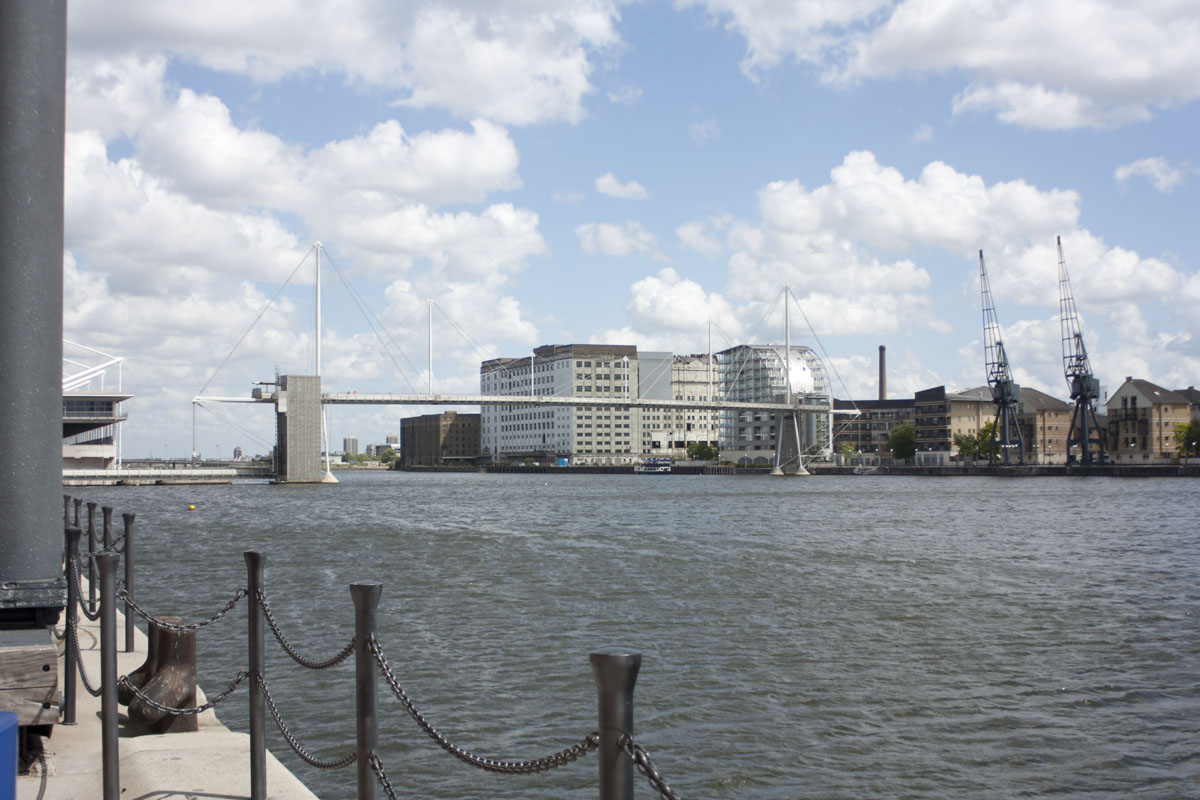
Royal Victoria Dock Bridge 2011

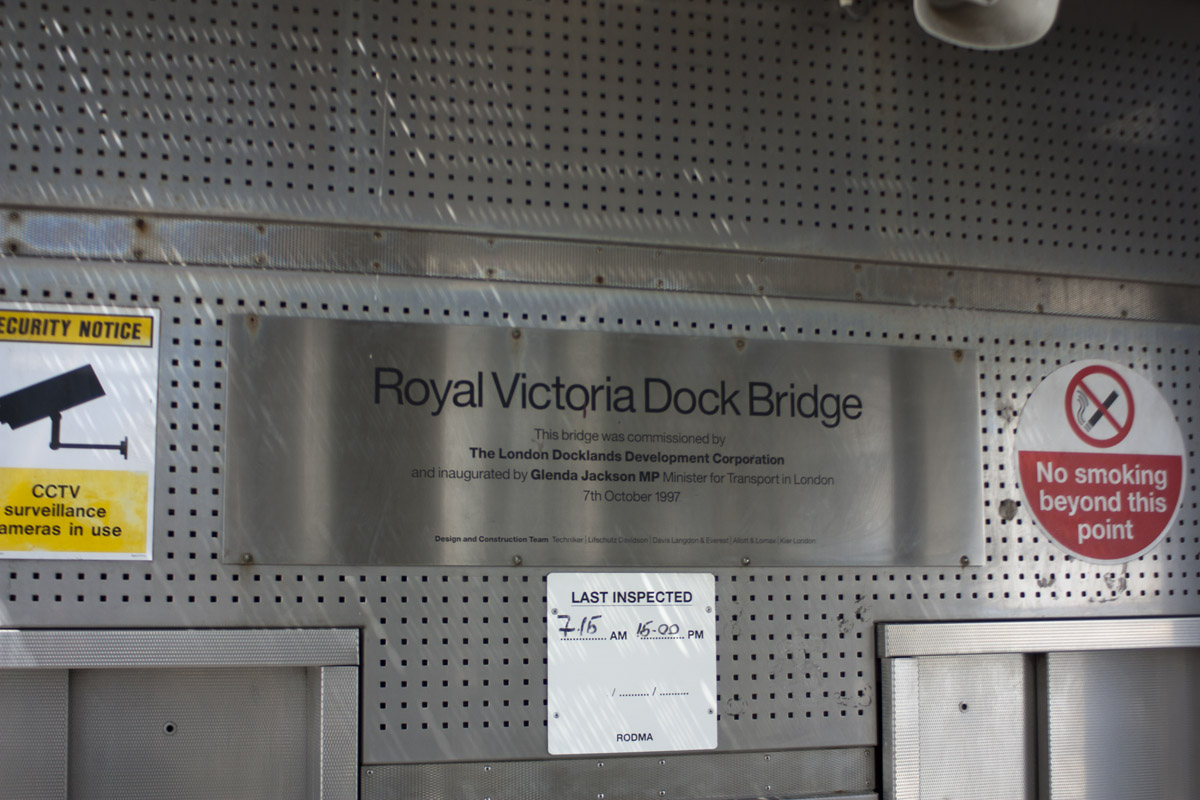
Royal Victoria Dock Bridge Plate 2011

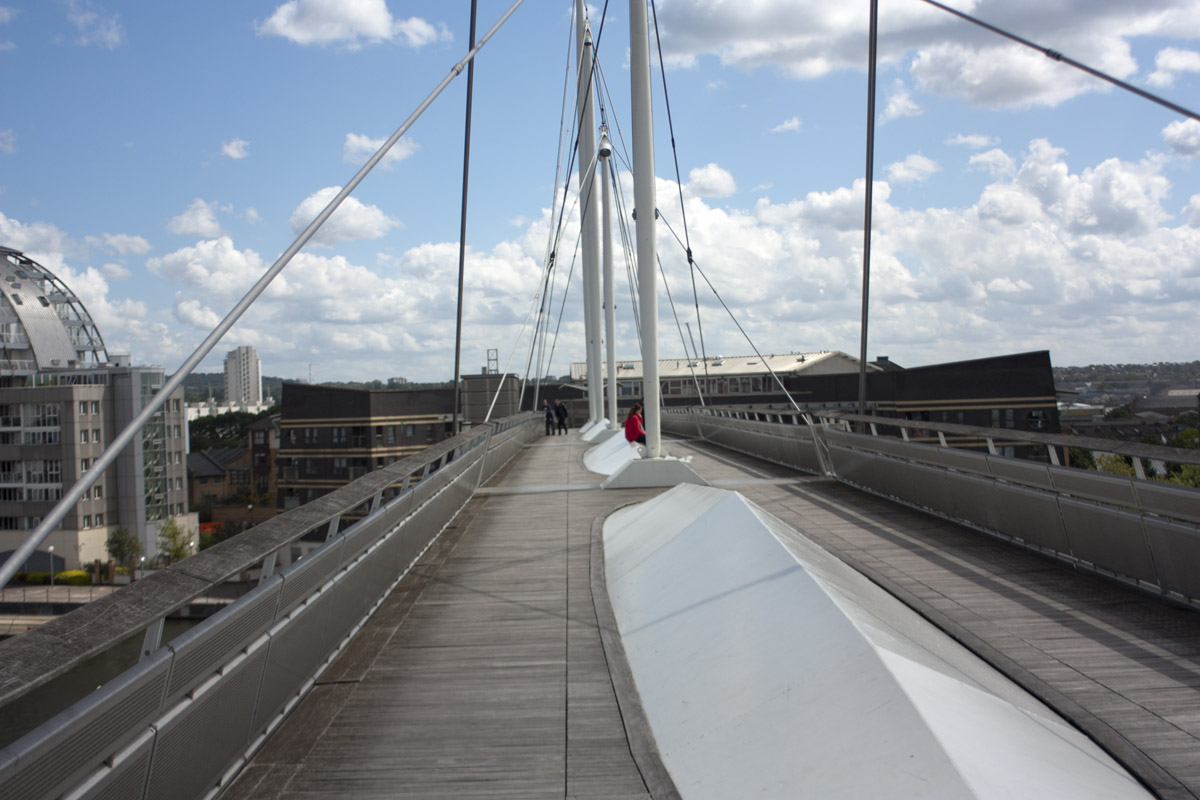
Royal Victoria Dock Bridge upper level 2011

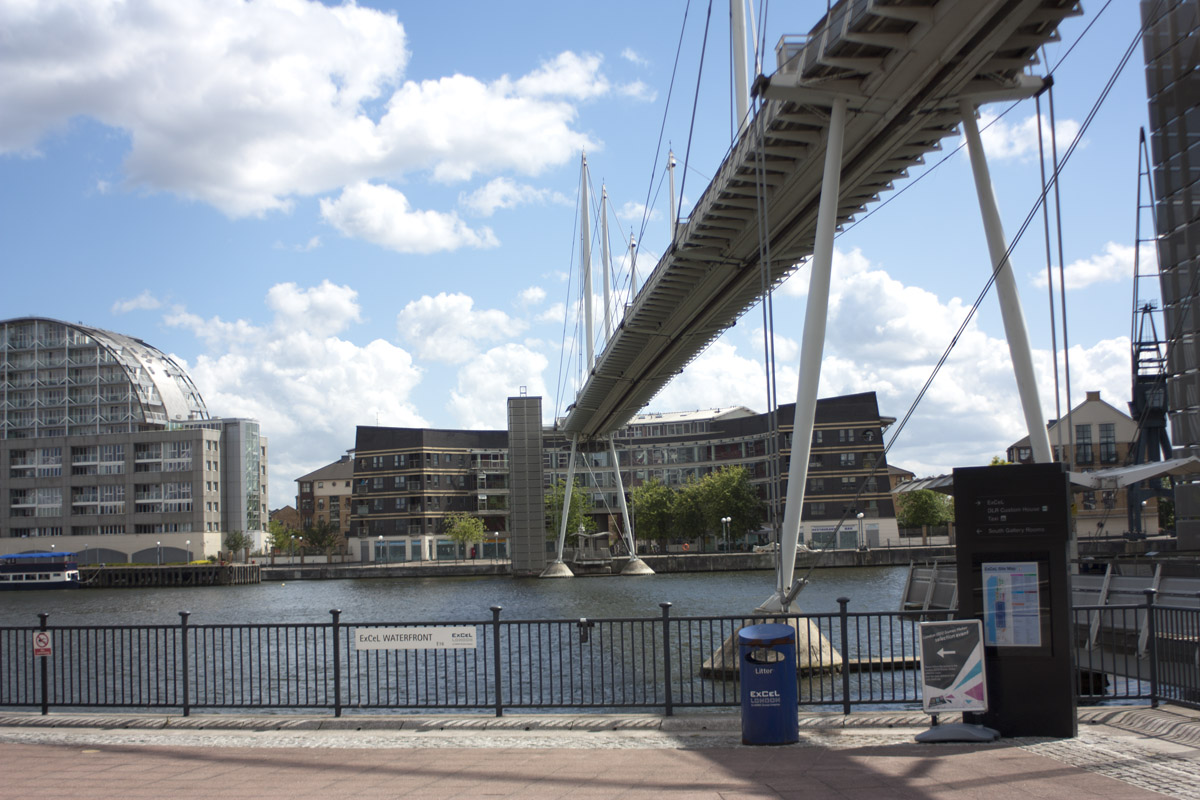
Close-up of Royal Victoria Dock Bridge

== See also ==
- List of bridges in London
