= Frost Meadowcroft =

Commercial real estate consultancy

- Type: Limited company
- Industry: Chartered surveyors and commercial property consultants
- Founded: 1976
- Headquarters: Hammersmith, Kensington, London, UK
- Key people: Justin Clack, Director, Simon Kibble, Director, Shaun Wolfe, Director, Vinh Hua and Sue Bunn
- Products: Commercial property consultancy, property investment, acquisitions, valuation, commercial sales and lettings.
- Website: www.frostmeadowcroft.com

Frost Meadowcroft is a professional services company specialising in commercial property consultancy. Its offices are at 22 St Peter's Square former offices of Island Records and at 96 Kensington High Street. It specialises in offices and commercial property investments in the area west of west end including Paddington, Kensington, Chelsea, Hammersmith, Fulham and Chiswick.

The Royal Institution of Chartered Surveyors lists the firm as a private practice offering commercial property, lease renewal, leasehold enfranchisement, rent review and valuation services.

== Selected Projects ==
22 St Peter's Square,

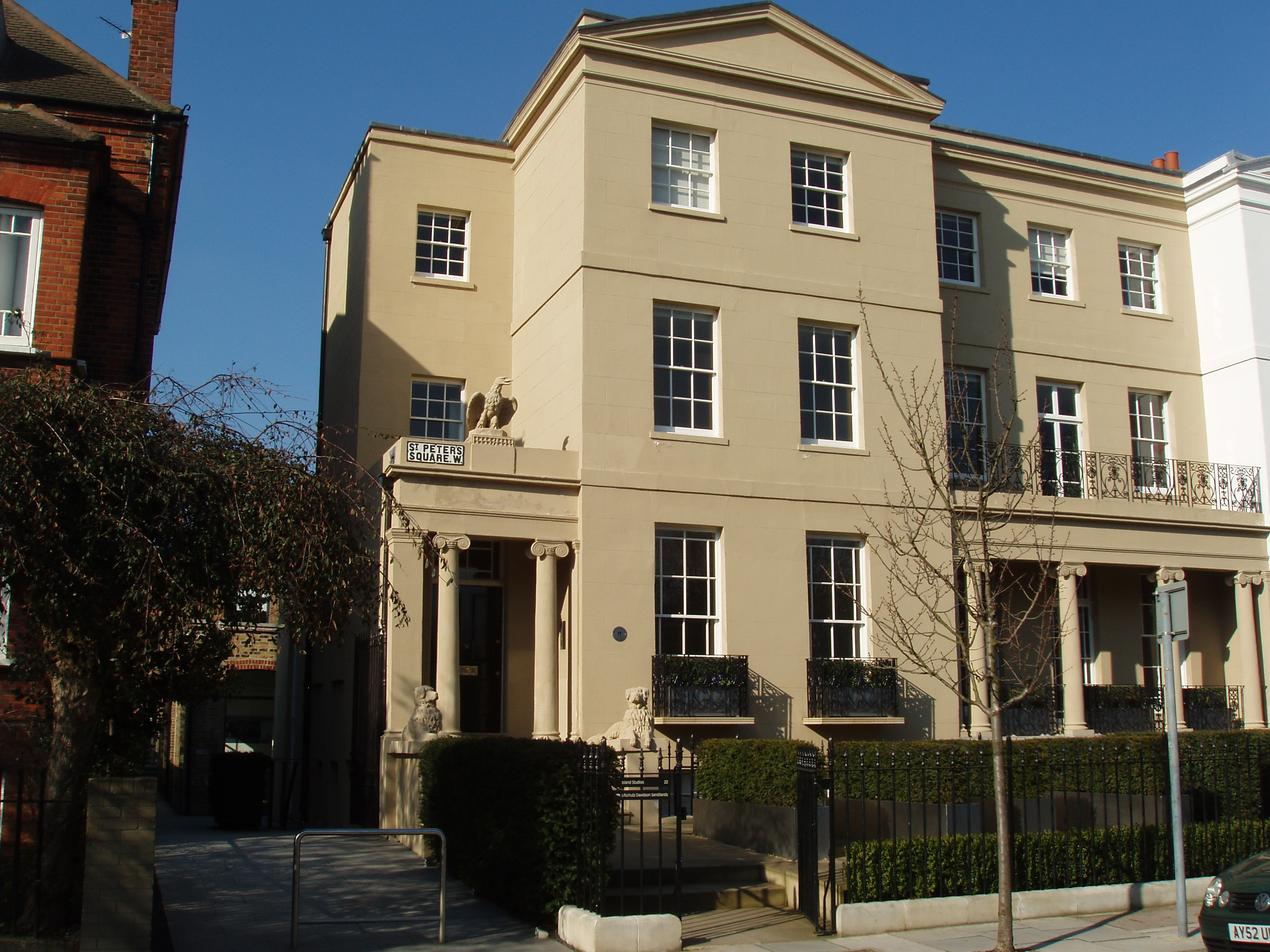
The front building of 22 St Peter's Square

Thames Wharf Studios.

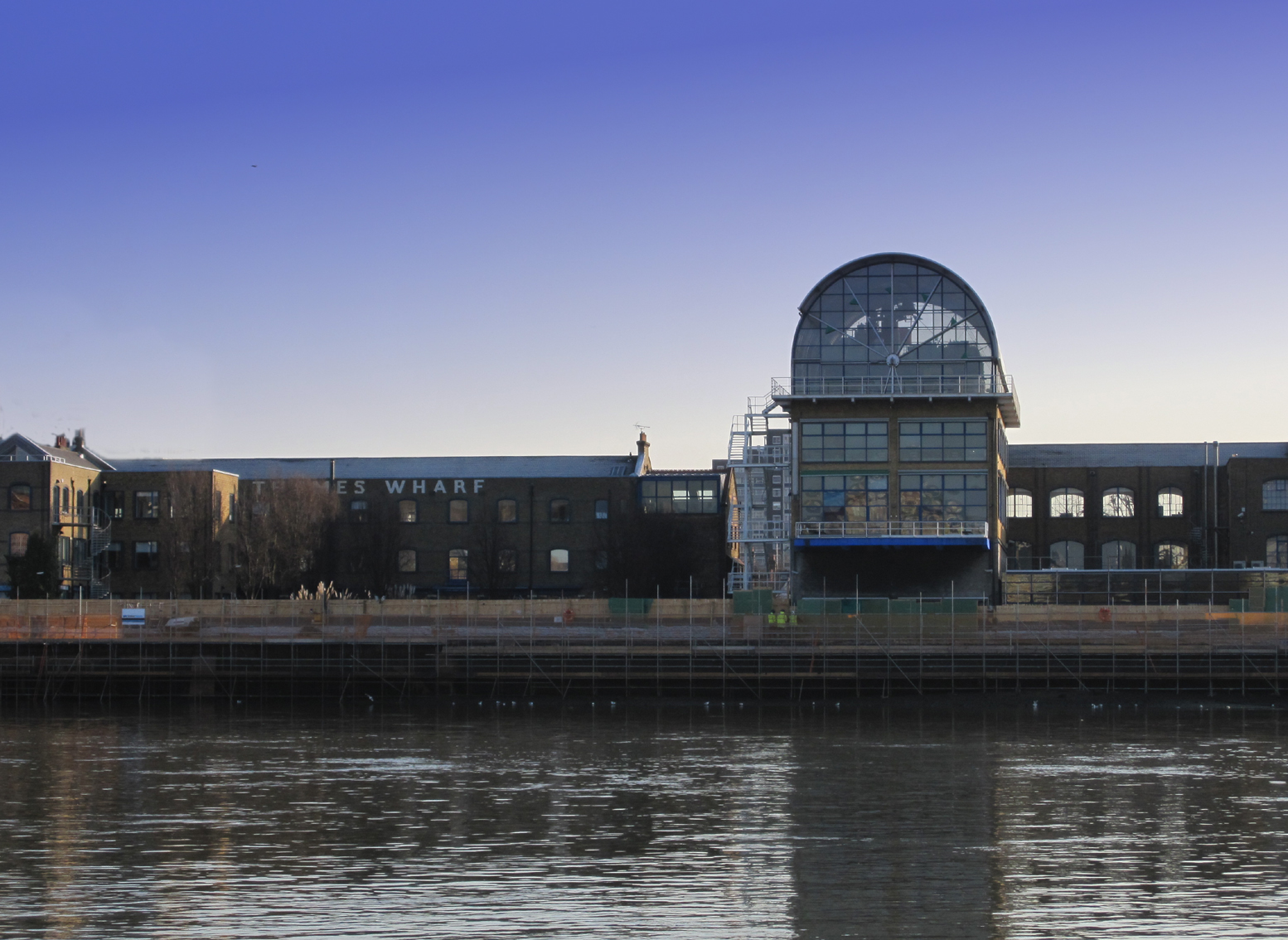
Thames Wharf Studios in March 2010, taken from Barnes across The River

Chelsea Harbour, Colet Court, Westfield London

Chiswick Tower, Fulham Green owned by Jon Hunt's Ocubis

== Selected Clients ==
Lifschutz Davidson Sandilands, Next Fifteen Communications, Diageo, Westfield Jellycat Helical Bar and Rambert Dance Company.

== In The Press ==
Frost Meadowcroft's Justin Clack, writes about architecture in Richard Branson's Project magazine and Umbrella Magazine. He also writes an architectural and social history article on Westway (London) and Ford Dagenham in Umbrella Magazine's issue 4 and issue 6.
