= Anne (British TV series) =

British TV miniseries

- Title card
- Written by: Kevin Sampson
- Directed by: Bruce Goodison
- Starring: Maxine Peake
- Composer: Samuel Sim
- Country of origin: United Kingdom
- Original language: English
- No. of series: 1
- No. of episodes: 4

Production
- Executive producer: Simon Heath
- Producer: Julia Stannard
- Cinematography: Adam Gillham
- Editors: Joe Carey; Kim Gaster
- Production company: World Productions

Original release
- Network: ITV
- Release: 2 January – 5 January 2022

Anne, subtitled One Mother's Story, is a British historical four-part television drama developed by World Productions. Starring Maxine Peake as the titular campaigner Anne Williams, the four-part drama revolves around the Hillsborough disaster of 1989 and its aftermath. The series premiered on ITV on 2 January 2022 and aired for four consecutive nights.

== Cast ==
- Maxine Peake as Anne Williams
- Stephen Walters as Steve Williams
- Campbell Wallace as Kevin Williams
- Bobby Schofield as Michael Williams
- Lily Shepherd and Ellie May Davies as Sara Williams
- Clare Calbraith as Sheila Coleman
- Rob Jarvis as John Glover
- Matthew McNulty as Andy Burnham
- Polly Kemp as Ann Adlington
- Raymond Waring as Steve Hart
- Ian Puleston-Davies as Phil Scraton
- Gracie Kelly as Debra Martin

== Production ==
=== Development ===
The series was in development as of 2018. After some deliberation, the dramatisation of Anne Williams' life and work by World Productions for ITV received approval from her real life daughter Sara, who was nine when the disaster occurred. She would help with the script, written by Kevin Sampson, author of Hillsborough Voices. Bruce Goodison would direct and Simon Heath of World Productions would executive produce the drama.

=== Casting ===
It was announced in September 2018 that Maxine Peake would star as Anne Williams. Stephen Walters would co-star as Williams' husband Steve.

=== Filming ===
Principal photography was scheduled to begin on location in Liverpool in summer 2018. Cast and crew were reported in Formby, at St George's Hall, and at Anfield that October. Steve Kelly, who lost his brother Michael in the Hillsborough disaster and was consulted for the series, stated he did a "double take" watching Peake on set.

== Reception ==
The review aggregator Rotten Tomatoes reported an approval rating of 100% based on 9 reviews, with an average rating of 8.4/10.

=== Awards ===
Year	Award	Category	Nominee	Result	Ref.
2022	Seoul International Drama Awards	Best Mini-Series	Anne	Won (shared with Last Summers of the Raspberries)	
