= Black Lion, Hammersmith =

Pub in Hammersmith, London

Coordinates: 51.4902°N 0.2418°W

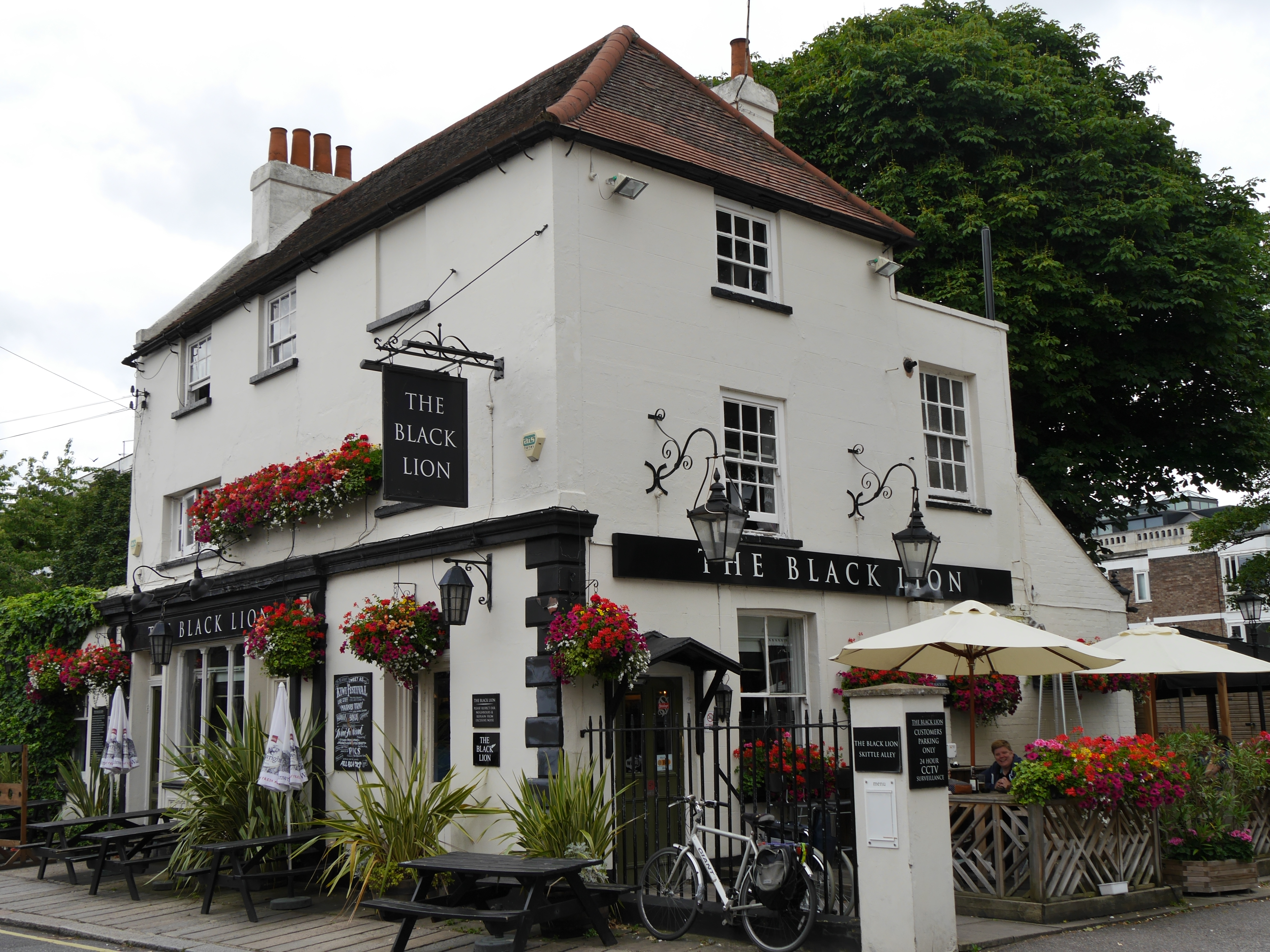
The Black Lion

The Black Lion is a Grade II listed public house at South Black Lion Lane, Hammersmith, London.

It dates from the late 18th century.
