= Jean Clark (artist) =

British painter (1902–1999)

- Born: Jean Manson Wymer; 6 August 1902; Sidcup, Kent, England
- Died: 29 March 1999 (aged 96); Saxtead, Suffolk, England
- Education: Sidcup School of Art; Royal Academy Schools; Academie Julian
- Known for: Painting and murals
- Spouse: Cosmo Clark (m.1924-1967, his death)

Jean Manson Clark (née Wymer; 6 August 1902 – 29 March 1999) was a British artist known for her depictions of townscapes, landscapes, for her flower paintings and murals.

== Life and career ==
Clark was born in Sidcup, Kent on 6 August 1902, the second of two children born to Daniel William Wymer, a mechanical engineer, and Jean Renwick, née Cuthbert, whose father was the artist John Spreckley Cuthbert. Clark left Merton Court School in 1913, aged twelve, and enrolled in the Sidcup School of Art and studied there until 1919 when she spent a year at the Royal Academy Schools. At the Royal Academy school she met Cosmo Clark, a decorated Army captain who had returned to studying after serving in the trenches during World War I. The couple married in 1924 and then spent some time at the Academie Julian in Paris. The Clarks spent two years in New York during 1928 and 1929 where Jean did the commercial illustration work. Returning to London they established a home and studio at St Peter's Square in Hammersmith where several other artists, including Eric Kennington were among their neighbours. A chance meeting with the elderly Walter Sickert led to Clark teaching at the small art school he was running at Broadstairs in Kent in the 1930s. During World War II the Clarks were based in Leamington Spa where Cosmo worked as a camouflage officer and Jean did land work.

She created several notable murals during her career including a number of church commissions. She regularly exhibited her paintings, mostly watercolours, with the New English Art Club, NEAC, the Royal West of England Academy and with the Royal Society of British Artists. Between 1945 and 1969 Clark was a regular exhibitor at the Royal Academy and showed paintings of tennis scenes there in both 1950 and 1951. She was elected a member of the NEAC in 1952 and of the Royal Watercolour Society in 1972.

After her husband died in 1967, Clark moved from London to their former holiday home at Shottisham where she continued to paint and a retrospective exhibition of her work was held at the Bankside Gallery in 1983. She died in Saxtead, Suffolk on 29 March 1999, aged 96. The Chappel Galleries in Chappel had a joint retrospective of her and her husband's work in 2002.

== Murals created ==
- Corpus Christi Church, Weston-super-Mare.
- Painted ceiling, Woodford Green United Free Church.
- Two murals for the Cutlers' Hall, Sheffield.
- Carpenters' Hall, London.
- The Committee Room of the Bankers' Clearing House, City of London.
