= Alexander Duckham =

- Born: 11 March 1877; Blackheath, London, England
- Died: 1 February 1945 (aged 67)
- Known for: Duckhams Oils
- Scientific career
- Fields: Tribology, lubricants

Alexander Duckham (11 March 1877 – 1 February 1945) was an English chemist and businessman, best known for the development of machine lubricants. The son of an engineer, after university he specialised in lubrication, working briefly for Fleming's Oil Company before founding his own company, Alexander Duckham & Co, in Millwall in 1899.

By the outbreak of World War I, he was an authority on technological problems relating to lubrication, and the company went public in about 1920, relocating from Millwall to Hammersmith. By the time he died in 1945, Duckhams had assumed a dominant position for the supply of lubricants and corrosion inhibitors to the motor industry in Britain and other markets. A new manufacturing plant was opened in Staffordshire in 1968, and soon thereafter the company was taken over by BP.

== Early career ==
Duckham was born in Blackheath, London, the second eldest son (his elder brother was Frederick and younger brother Sir Arthur Duckham) of a Falmouth-born mechanical and civil engineer, Frederic Eliot Duckham (1841 - died 13 January 1918 in Blackheath), who had patented improvements in governors for marine engines and invented a 'Hydrostatic Weighing Machine'. His mother was Maud Mary McDougall (1849-1921), sister of John McDougall of the flour-making family, which had a mill at Millwall Dock. His younger brother, Arthur Duckham, became one of the founders of the Institution of Chemical Engineers, and its first President. His elder brother, Frederick, also an engineer, was Director of Tank Design in World War One.

Upon leaving university in 1899, Alexander Duckham, who had worked briefly for Fleming's Oil Company, was encouraged by engineer Sir Alfred Yarrow, who lived nearby (Yarrow occupied Woodlands House in Mycenae Road, Westcombe Park for some years from 1896, close to the Duckham family home in Dartmouth Grove, Blackheath) to specialise in the study of lubrication, and was introduced to engineering firms with lubrication problems. Duckham established Alexander Duckham & Co in Millwall in 1899, and gradually assembled a team of engineers and chemists to whom he could delegate research work, freeing him to focus on lubricant production. Early customers included car dealer and racing driver Selwyn Edge who called weekly at Duckham's Millwall works for an oil change; Duckham, who bought his first car in 1899, also used to accompany Edge to Brooklands.

Yarrow and Lord Fisher subsequently encouraged Duckham to focus on sourcing raw materials for lubricants. From 1905 he helped pioneer the development of the Trinidad oil fields, including a deposit near Tabaquite of high-class crude oil suitable as a base for the preparation of lubricants, establishing a private company, Trinidad Central Oilfields, in 1911. The discovery and development of such lubricants was timely, coinciding with the evolution of internal combustion engines which demanded more advanced lubrication.

As well as being a successful businessman, Duckham was an early aviation pioneer and close friend of cross-channel aviator Louis Blériot – he paid for the stone memorial in Dover marking the place where Blériot landed in 1909 to complete the first flight across the English Channel in a heavier-than-air aircraft, (Note: The first flight across the English Channel was made in 1785 using a hydrogen balloon.) and 25 years later hosted a dinner at London's Savoy Hotel marking the anniversary of the flight.

== Duckhams ==
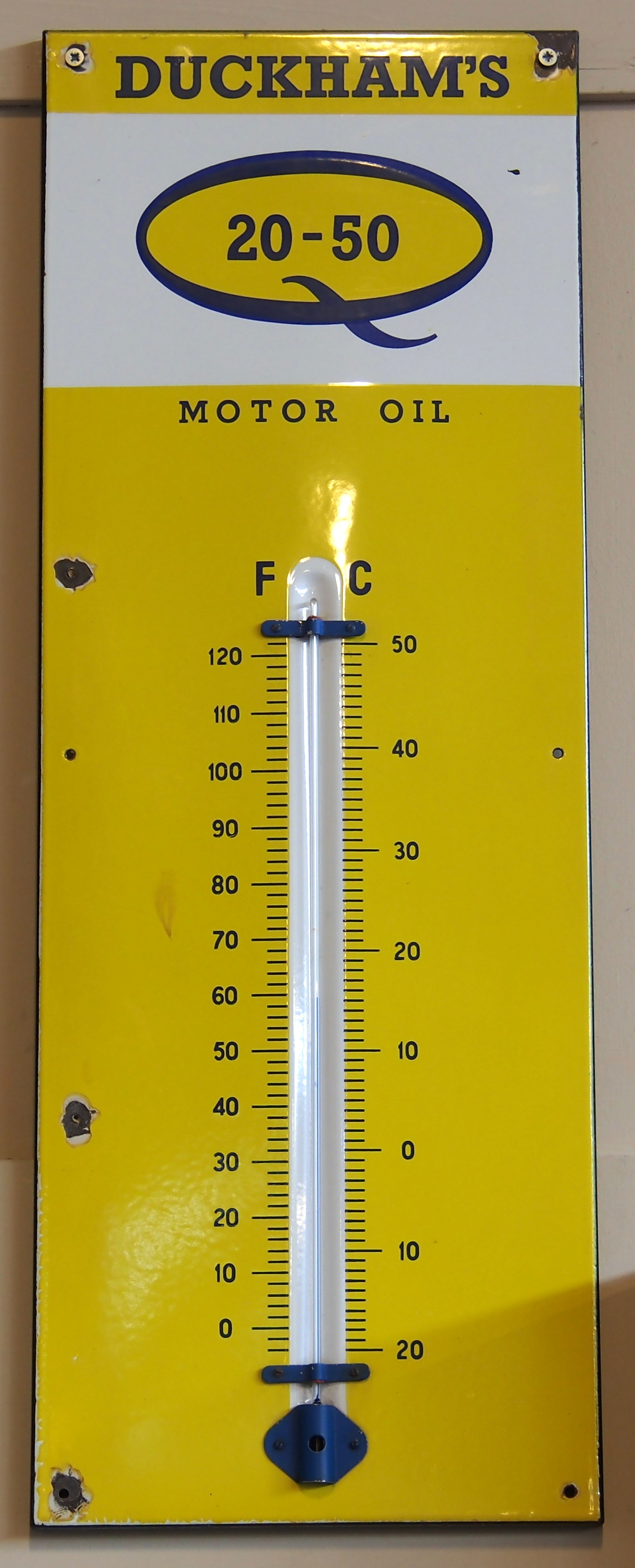
Thermometer with an enamel backing, featuring an advert for Duckham's 20–50 motor oil

The outbreak of World War I in 1914 heightened the focus on mechanical efficiency, and the Duckham company was already established as the highest authority on technological problems in matters of lubrication. The company went public (c. 1920) soon after the war finished, and relocated from Millwall to Hammersmith in 1921.

By the time Alexander Duckham died in 1945 (being succeeded as company chairman by his son Jack), Duckhams had assumed a dominant position in supply of lubricants and corrosion inhibitors to the motor industry and other markets. Behind Castrol, by 1967, it was regarded as the largest independent lubricating oil company in the UK and the third largest supplier of engine oil to motorists, producing the first multigrade oil for motorists. To cope with demand, a new manufacturing plant was opened in Aldridge, Staffordshire in 1968, shortly before the company was acquired by BP in 1969. Duckhams' Hammersmith site closed in 1979, was acquired by Richard Rogers' architects practice (today Rogers Stirk Harbour + Partners) in 1983, and was redeveloped to become the Thames Wharf Studios and the River Café.

== Family ==
He married Violet Ethel Narraway in 1902, and they had five children, all born in Greenwich: Alec Narraway Duckham (born c. 1904); Millicent A. M. Duckham (c. 1905); Joan Ethel Duckham (c. 1906); Jack Eliot Duckham (c. 1908); and Ruth Edith Duckham (born 1918).

The family lived for some years from 1907 in Vanbrugh Castle, close to Greenwich Park. In 1920, Duckham donated the house (and another property, Rooks Hill House in Sevenoaks) to the RAF Benevolent Fund to be used as a school for the children of RAF personnel killed in service. Vanbrugh Castle was later sold after the number of pupils declined; sale proceeds were used to educate RAF children, with funds later (1997) transferred to a charitable trust, the Alexander Duckham Memorial Schools Trust.
