= Esders and Scheefhals building =

Au Pont Rouge
- Торговый дом «С. Эсдерс и К. Схейфальс» (in Russian)
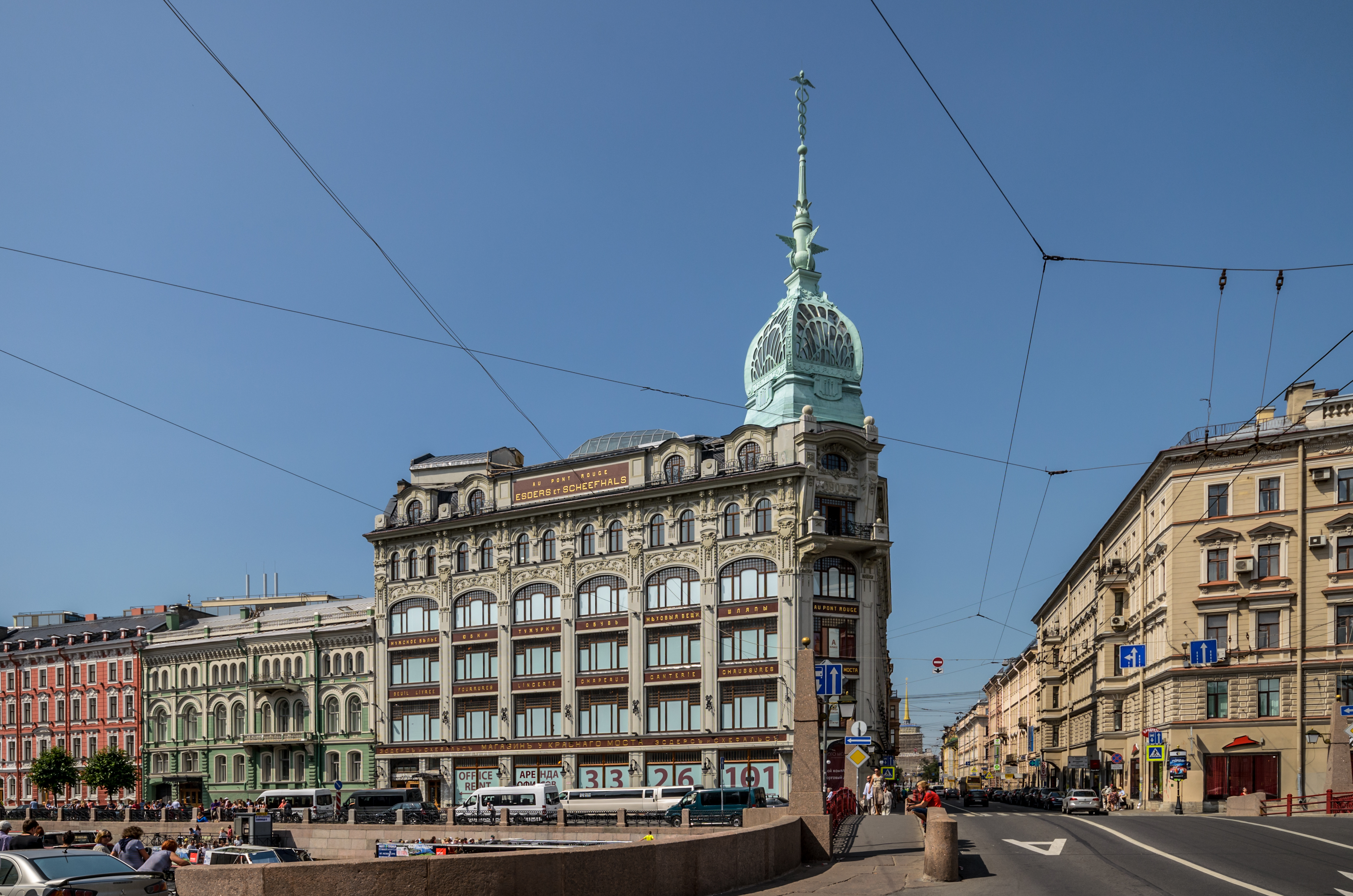
- Au Pont Rouge
- Interactive map of the Au Pont Rouge area
- Alternative names: Швейная фабрика им. В. Володарского

General information
- Architectural style: Art Nouveau
- Location: Moika River Embankment 73, Saint Petersburg, Russia
- Coordinates: 59°55′59″N 30°18′51″E
- Completed: 1907

Design and construction
- Architect: Vladimir Lipsky

The Esders and Scheefhals building (Russian: Здание торгового дома “Эсдерс и Схейфальс”, Zdaniye torgovogo doma “Esders i Skheyfal's”) is a monumental building, originally a department store, in Saint Petersburg, Russia. The building is a "historic and cultural monument of the people of the Russian Federation" and is located at Moika Embankment 73-79 at the corner of Gorokhovaya Street, before the Red Bridge over the Moika.

== History ==
The building was constructed in 1906-07 by architects Konstantin de Rochefort (see article in Russian Wikipedia) and V.A. Lipskii.

Until 1919 it functioned as the "S. Esders and K. Scheyfals Trading House", also known as У красного моста (U krasnova mosta, "By the Red Bridge"). Signs on the building were in Russian and French — the French name indicated as Au Pont Rouge. It was an undertaking of Stefan Esders (see the article in German Wikipedia), who had a factory in Brussels and department stores in Berlin, Paris, Rotterdam, Breslau (now Wrocław) and Vienna in addition to St. Petersburg. Scheefhals was the Dutch partner for the St. Petersburg branch.

After the revolution, in 1919, the building became a sewing factory producing menswear. In 1922 it was given the name Volodarsky Sewing Factory in honor of the Marxist revolutionary and early Soviet politician Moisei Goldstein, who went by the name of V. Volodarsky.

The cupola was torn down in the 1930s in order not to spoil the view of the Admiralty tower. (picture)

In 1992 the factory was reorganized as FOSP (Fabrika odezhdy Sankt-Peterburga, Фабрика одежды Санкт-Петербурга, "Saint Petersburg Clothing Factory").

The building underwent extensive renovation by BTK Development in 2011-12, and the cupola was rebuilt. The original department store signage, in French and Russian (with pre-revolutionary spelling), has also been restored. The building reopened in 2016 housing the Au Pont Rouge luxury department store, with architectural designs by London-based Lifschutz Davidson Sandilands and interiors by Rafael de Cárdenas/Architecture at Large.
