= The Cross Keys, Hammersmith =

Pub in London, England

Coordinates: 51.492316°N 0.242706°W

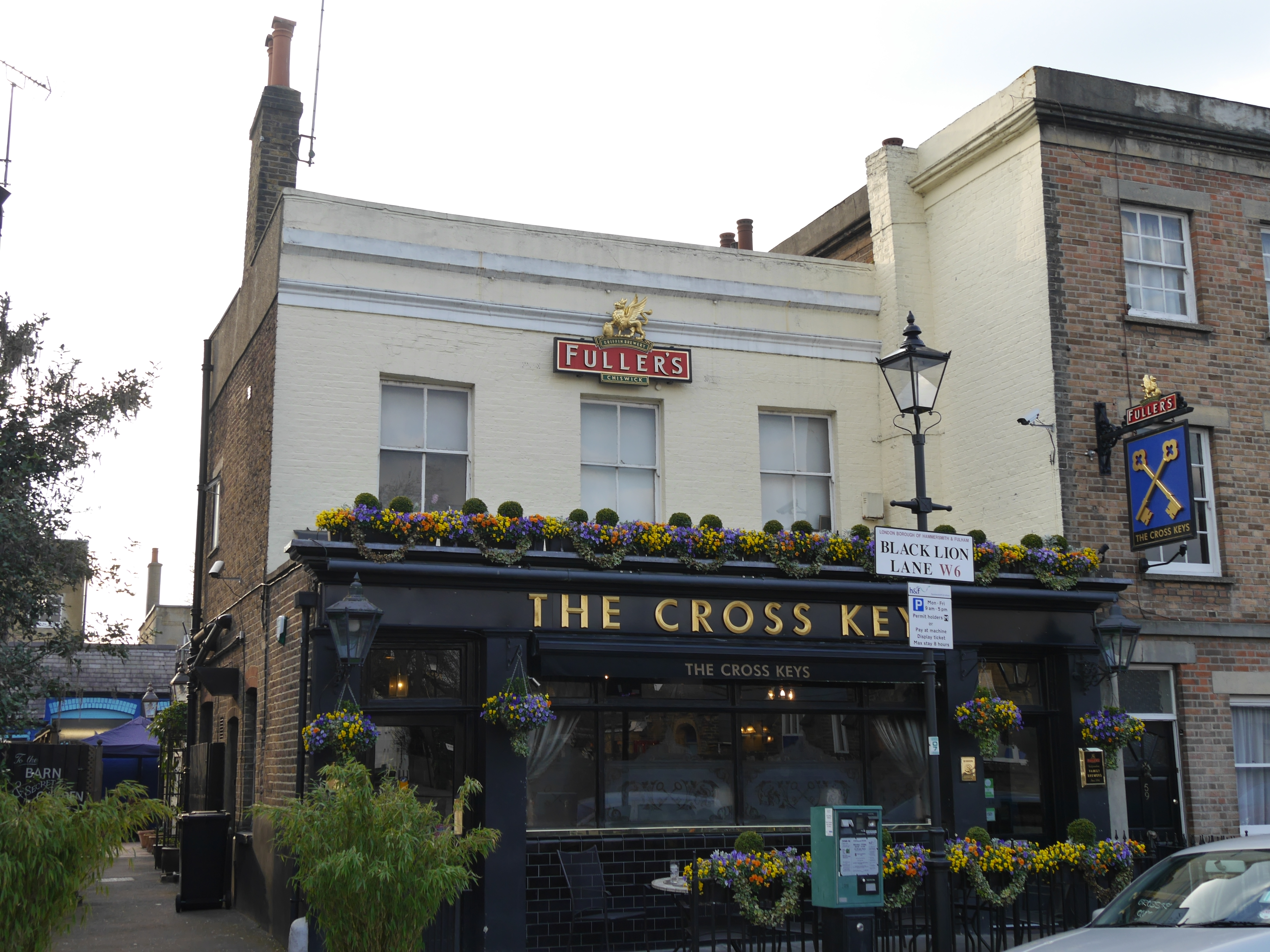
The Cross Keys, Hammersmith

The Cross Keys is a public house at 57 Black Lion Lane, Hammersmith, London.

It is run by Fuller's Brewery.

In 1981, it was the SPBW London Pub of the Year. Writing in The Guardian in 2009, James May called it his favourite pub, adding that it was also his local, "a mere 101 paces away from the house".
