= Anne Williams (activist) =

Hillsborough disaster activist (1951–2013)

Anne Elizabeth Williams (née Meath; 6 February 1951 – 18 April 2013) was a campaigner for the victims of the Hillsborough disaster of 1989, in which 97 Liverpool football fans, including her son Kevin Williams, died at Hillsborough Stadium in Sheffield.

== Hillsborough ==
Williams fought hard for a new inquiry into the Hillsborough disaster of 1989, her actions being prompted by the death of her own son Kevin at Hillsborough, who had been crushed to death in the disaster, aged 15. She levelled several legal attacks at the first Hillsborough inquest, questioning the credibility of its findings. She formed a pressure group "Hope For Hillsborough", subsequently merging it into the "Hillsborough Justice Campaign", eventually becoming chair of the latter.

Judith Moritz, a journalist for the BBC, said that although Williams had no legal training, to talk to her, one would have thought that she had trained for years.

== Personal life ==
Williams was born at Formby on 6 February 1951. After education at Our Lady of Lourdes school, Birkdale, she became a mother of three, living in Formby and working part-time in a newsagents. She had two sons by her first husband, the younger of whom was Kevin. After a divorce, she married Steve Williams, with whom she had a daughter. That relationship broke down in the years after Hillsborough.

She later lived in Chester, and died of cancer at the age of 62, on 18 April 2013. Two of her children survive her.

== Legacy ==
In December 2013, in honour of Williams' long campaign for justice for her son Kevin and all the victims of Hillsborough, she was posthumously awarded the Helen Rollason Award at the BBC Sports Personality of the Year Awards. Alan Hansen, who had been playing for Liverpool on the day of the tragedy, presented the award to Anne's brother Danny, her son Michael and daughter Sara. She received a standing ovation from the audience.

== In media ==
Williams was portrayed by Maxine Peake in the eponymous ITV drama Anne, which aired in January 2022. Writing in The Guardian, Jack Seale described the performance as "Almost unwatchably intense".
