= St Peter's Square, London =

Garden square in Hammersmith, London

Coordinates: 51.4919°N 0.2440°W

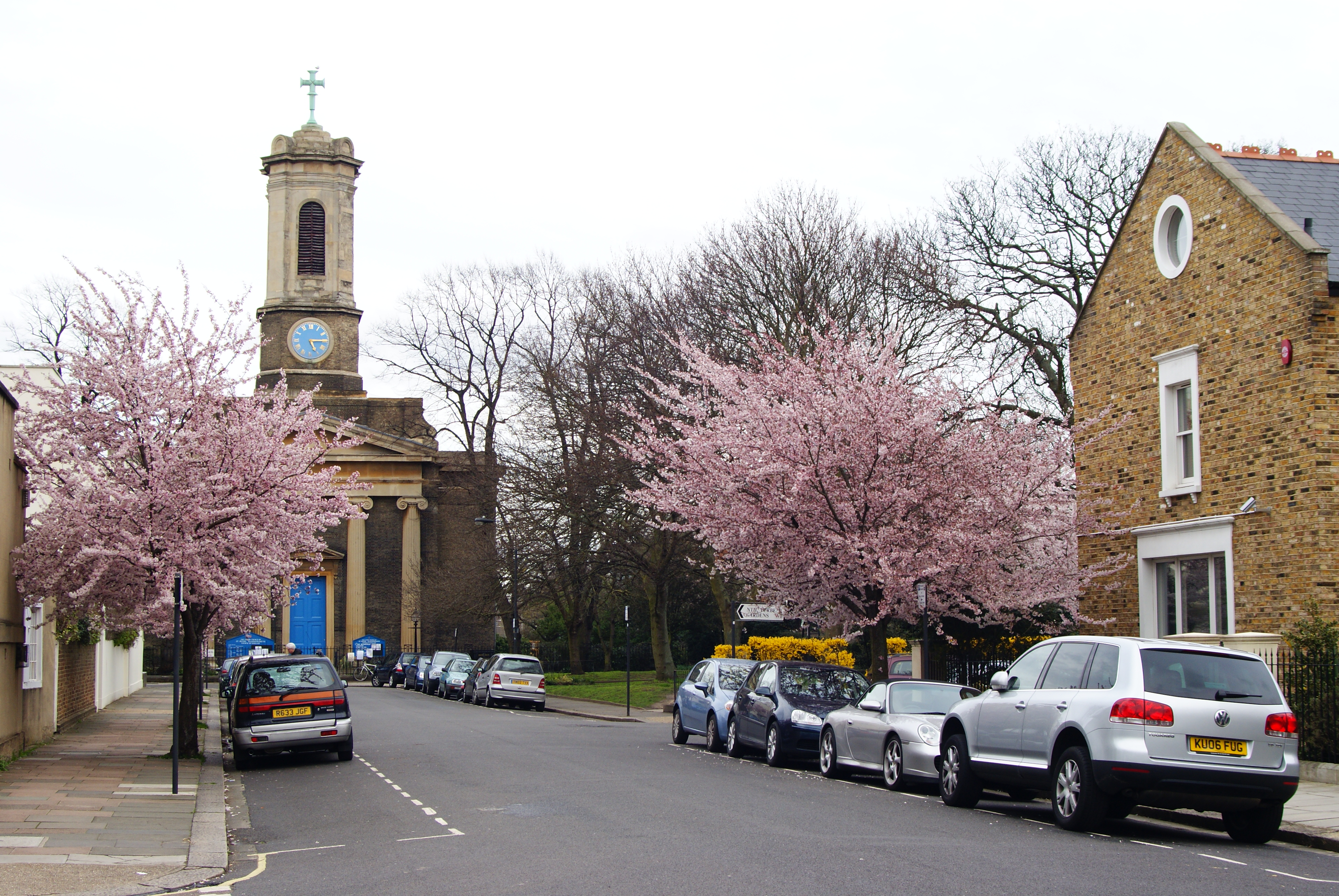
St Peter's Church

St Peter's Square, in Hammersmith, London, England, is a garden square laid out in the 1820s, just north of the River Thames between the Great West Road (A4) and King Street, within the St Peter's Square Conservation Area and London Borough of Hammersmith and Fulham.

== Locale ==
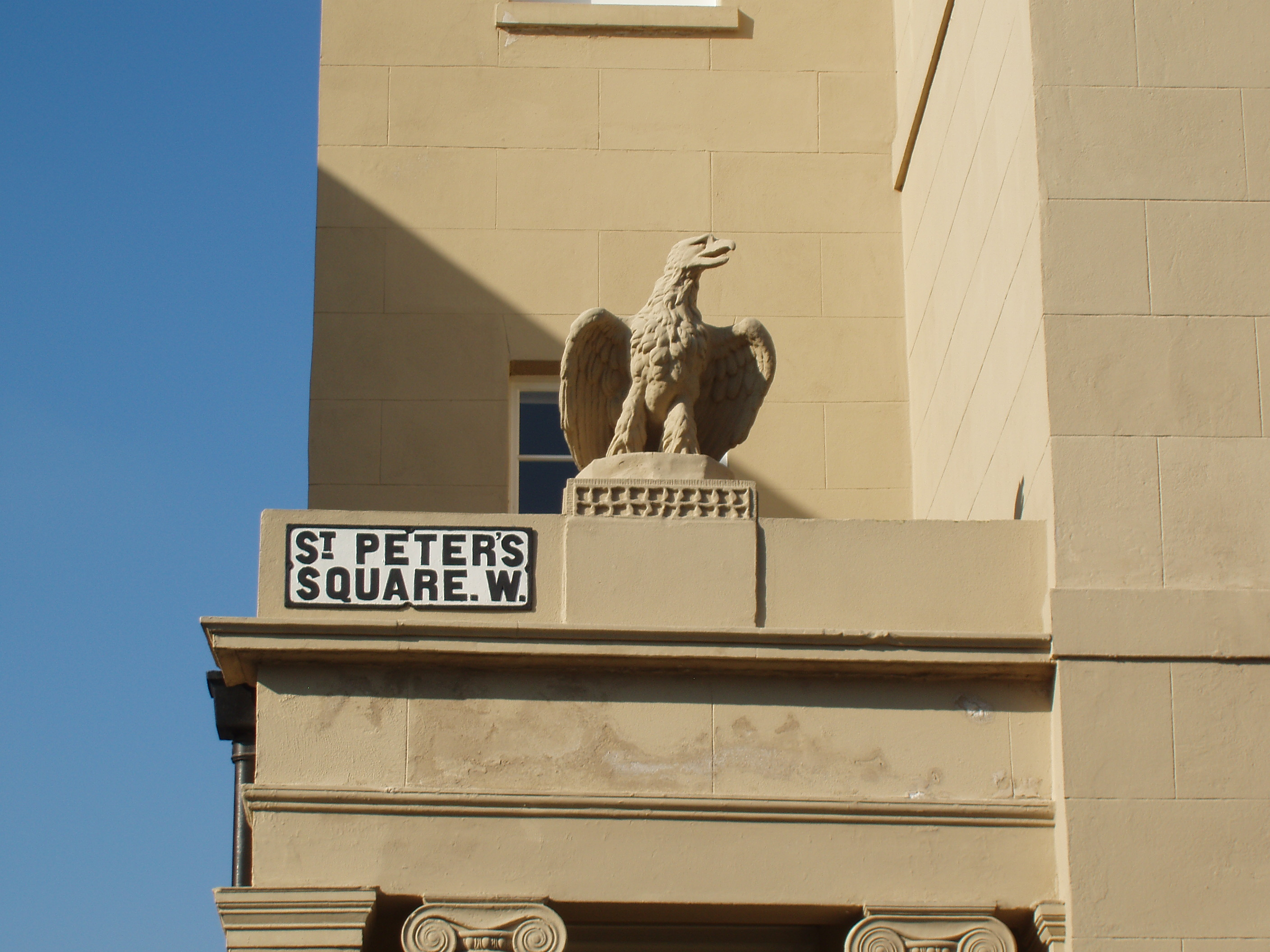
St Peter's Square sign

The limit of Chiswick (thus now also the London Borough of Hounslow) is the westernmost garden fences where there is a lane called British Grove. St Peter's Church, Hammersmith, the substantial Grecian Ionic structure that was completed in 1829 occupies the south eastern corner of the site and is opposite 22 St Peters Square, a Grade II listed architect's studio and office building, that was formerly Island Records headquarters and is now named Island Studios. The houses are a good example of 19th century squares architecture, with paired villas in classical style arranged around a central space. The square today is maintained by residents, in partnership with Hammersmith & Fulham Council.

== Garden ==
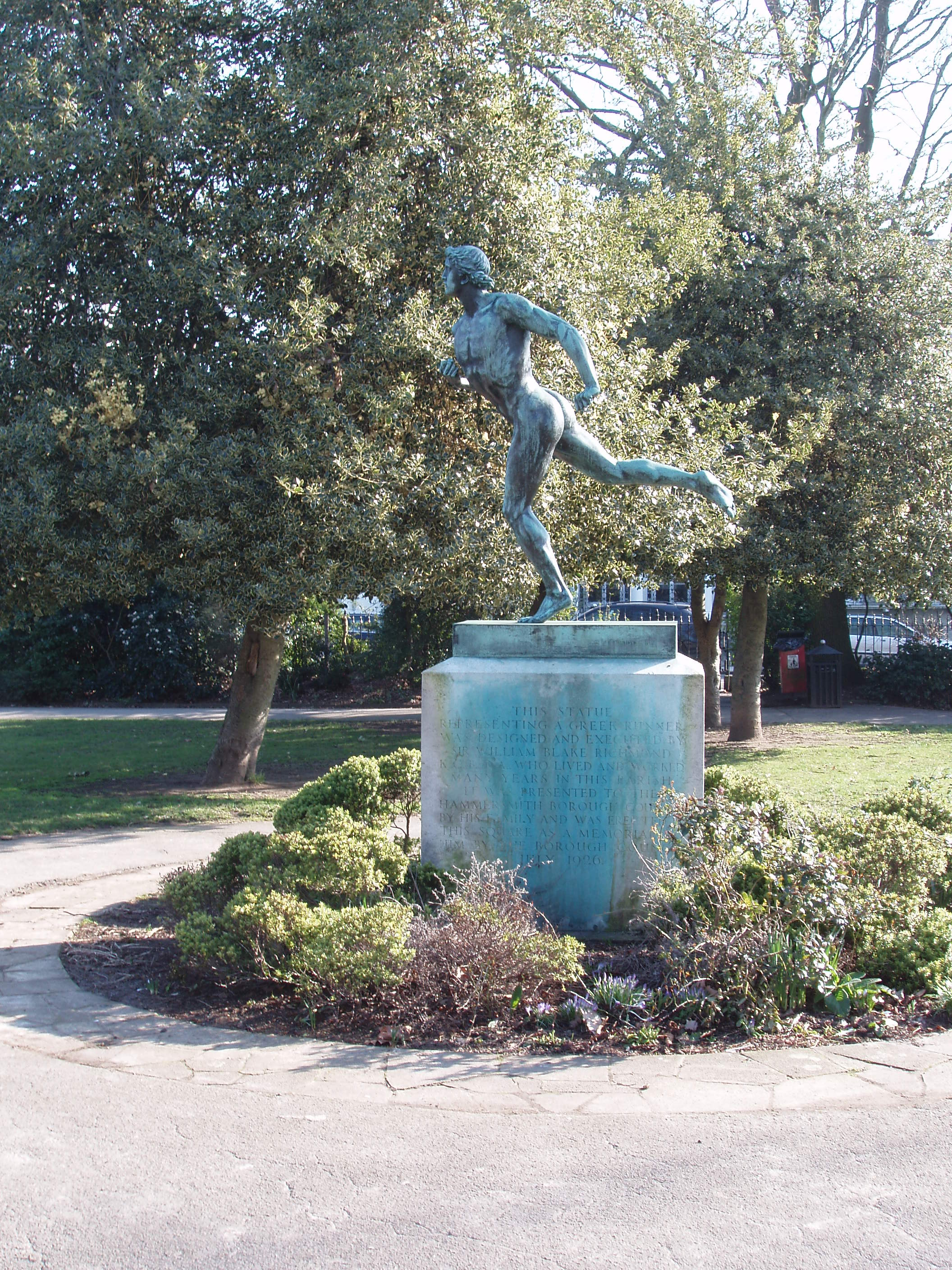
The Greek Runner, a statue by Sir William Blake Richmond.

The public garden in the centre of the square is Grade II listed on the English Heritage Register of Historic Parks and Gardens and is 1.5 hectares (3.7 acres)excluding roads. In 1913, a proposal to build on the garden was abandoned after local protests. The land was bought by the Borough Council and in 1915 the garden was opened to the public. The centre of the garden is occupied by a sculpture, The Greek Runner, by Sir William Blake Richmond, which was erected in 1926.

== History ==
The square was laid out during the economic boom of the 1820s, when the then owner, George Scott decided to build a speculative housing development on part of his Ravenscourt Park estate and also provided the land for St Peter's Church, Hammersmith. From 1827 plots were developed piecemeal by builders who undertook to conform to the master plan. The square was mostly complete by the end of the 1830s. The houses are mostly built in groups of three, with stucco fronts, pediments and Ionic porches. Some retain eagles, lions and dogs as decoration. Numbers 1 to 6 were the first to be built and are the grandest in the square.

== Notable inhabitants ==
- Sir Matthew Pinsent (born 1970), English rower
- Kim Medcalf (born 1973), British actress (played Sam Mitchell in EastEnders)
- Sarah Montague, BBC Radio 4 presenter
- Sir Trevor Nunn, theatrical director
- Andrea Catherwood, newsreader and news correspondent
- Charlie Mole, film composer

=== Previous notable inhabitants ===
- Alec Guinness, actor, lived at No.7 from 1946 to 1955
- Vanessa Redgrave (born 1937), actress
- (Alderman, Sir, and magistrate) Marshall Hays (born 1872), Mayor of Hammersmith
- John Piper (born 1903), artist, lived at No.22
- The artist Jean Clark lived at No.16 c. 1929 to 1967
- Natasha Kaplinsky, newsreader, news correspondent, winner of first series: Strictly Come Dancing lived at 1 St. Peter's Villas until around 2005.

=== Professional inhabitants ===
- Lifschutz Davidson Sandilands, architects
- Frost Meadowcroft, commercial property consultants
- Island Records record label (vacated 2005)

== Filming at St Peter's Square ==
The Pumpkin Eater was filmed on location at St Peter's Square in 1963/64. The director was Jack Clayton, the script was by Harold Pinter and the leading roles were played by Anne Bancroft and Peter Finch.

Many episodes of 1970s police series The Sweeney were filmed here, as well as Miss Potter, a 2006 Chris Noonan biopic of Beatrix Potter, I Capture The Castle, a 2003 film directed by Tim Fywell, and Silent Witness, a BBC thriller series, which was filmed in the Square in March 2010.
