= St Peter's Church, Hammersmith =

Coordinates: 51°29′29″N 0°14′31″W

- The Parish Church of Saint Peter
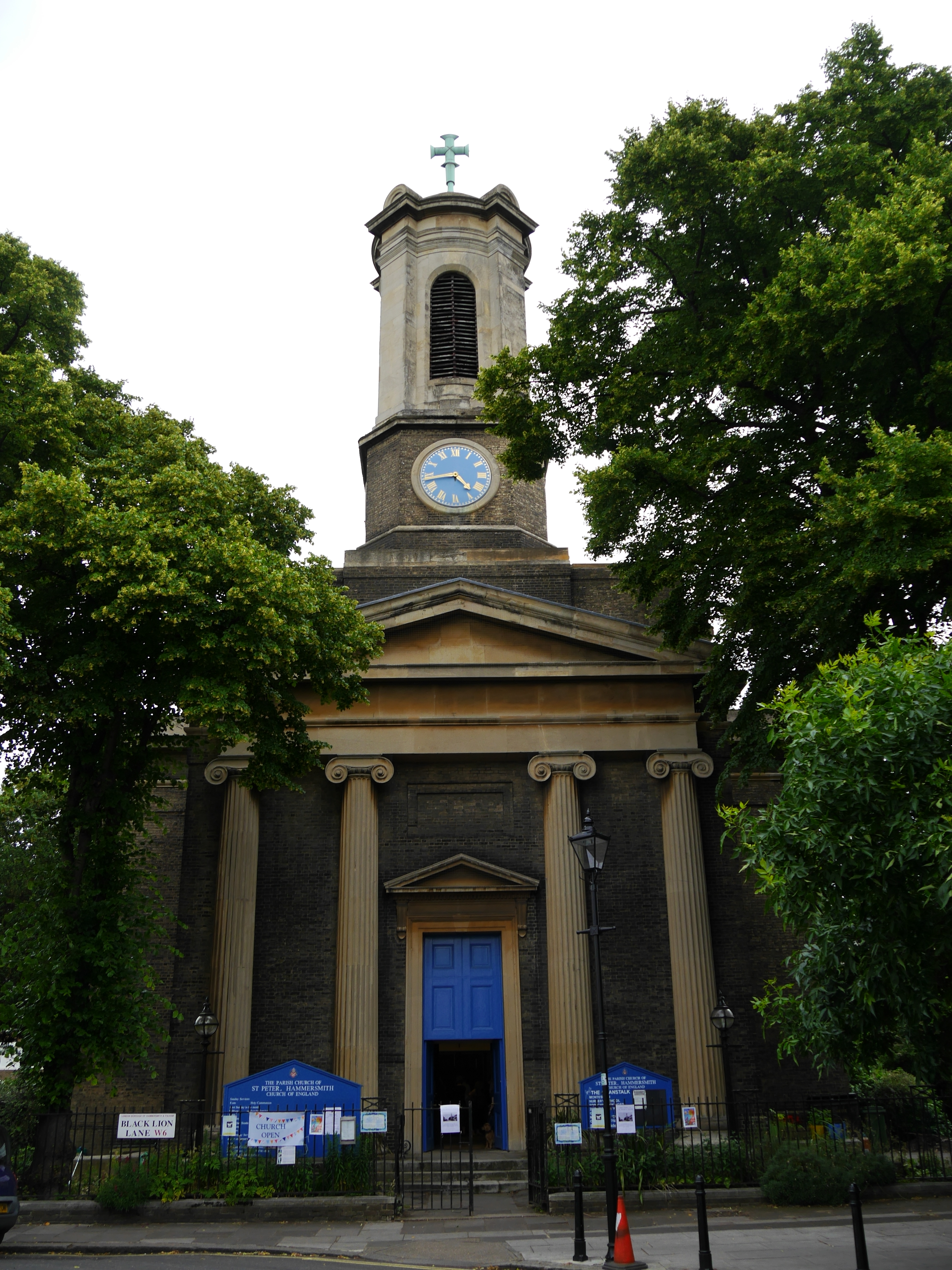
- St Peter's Church, Hammersmith
- Location: Black Lion Lane, Hammersmith, London, W6 9BE
- Country: England
- Denomination: Church of England
- Website: Official website

History
- Dedication: Peter the Apostle
- Consecrated: 15 October 1829

Administration
- Province: Canterbury
- Diocese: London
- Archdeaconry: Middlesex
- Deanery: Hammersmith and Fulham

Clergy
- Vicar: Rev'd Dr Charles Clapham

Listed Building – Grade II*
- Designated: 17 June 1954
- Reference no.: 1079843

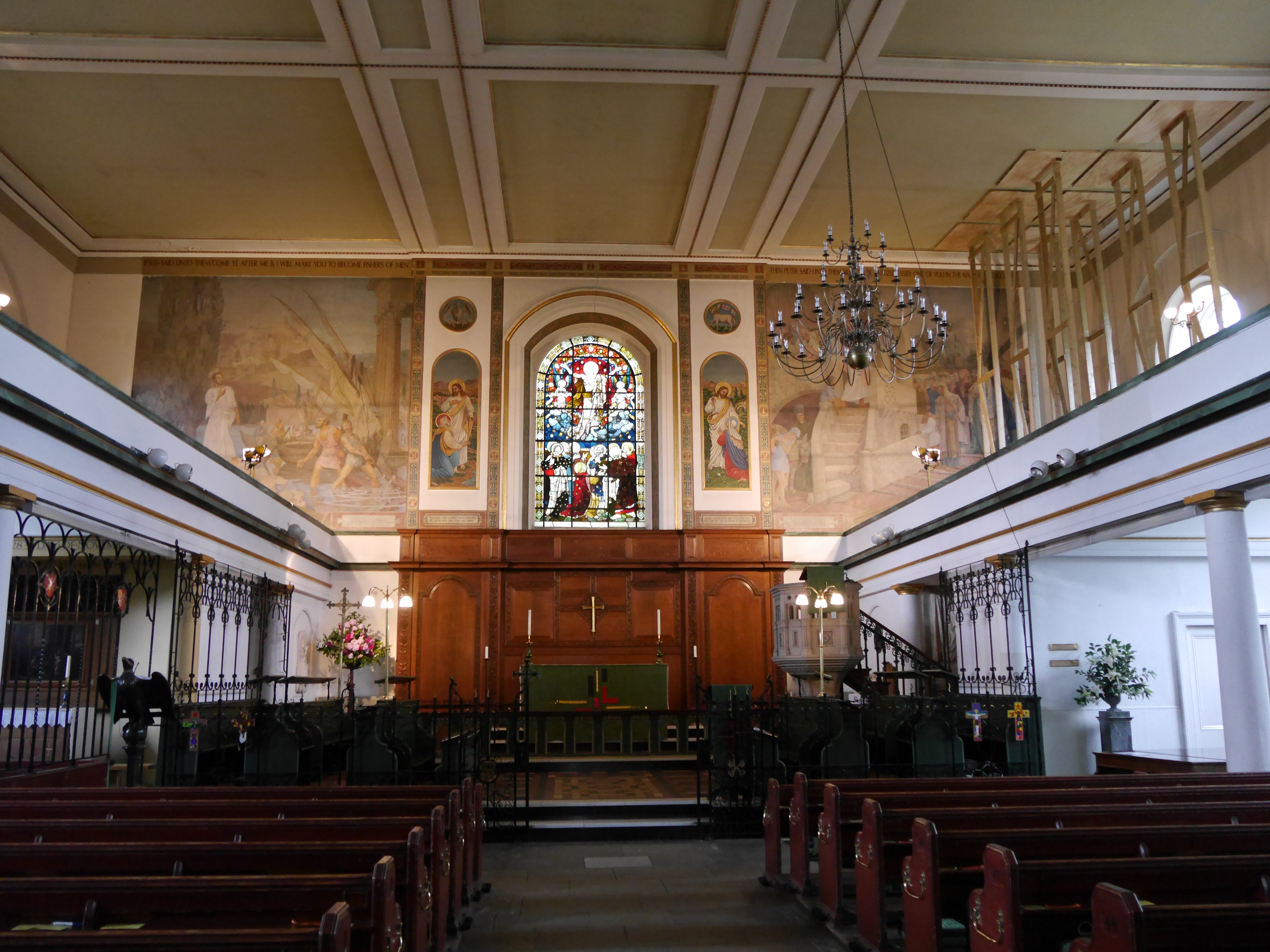
St Peter's, interior

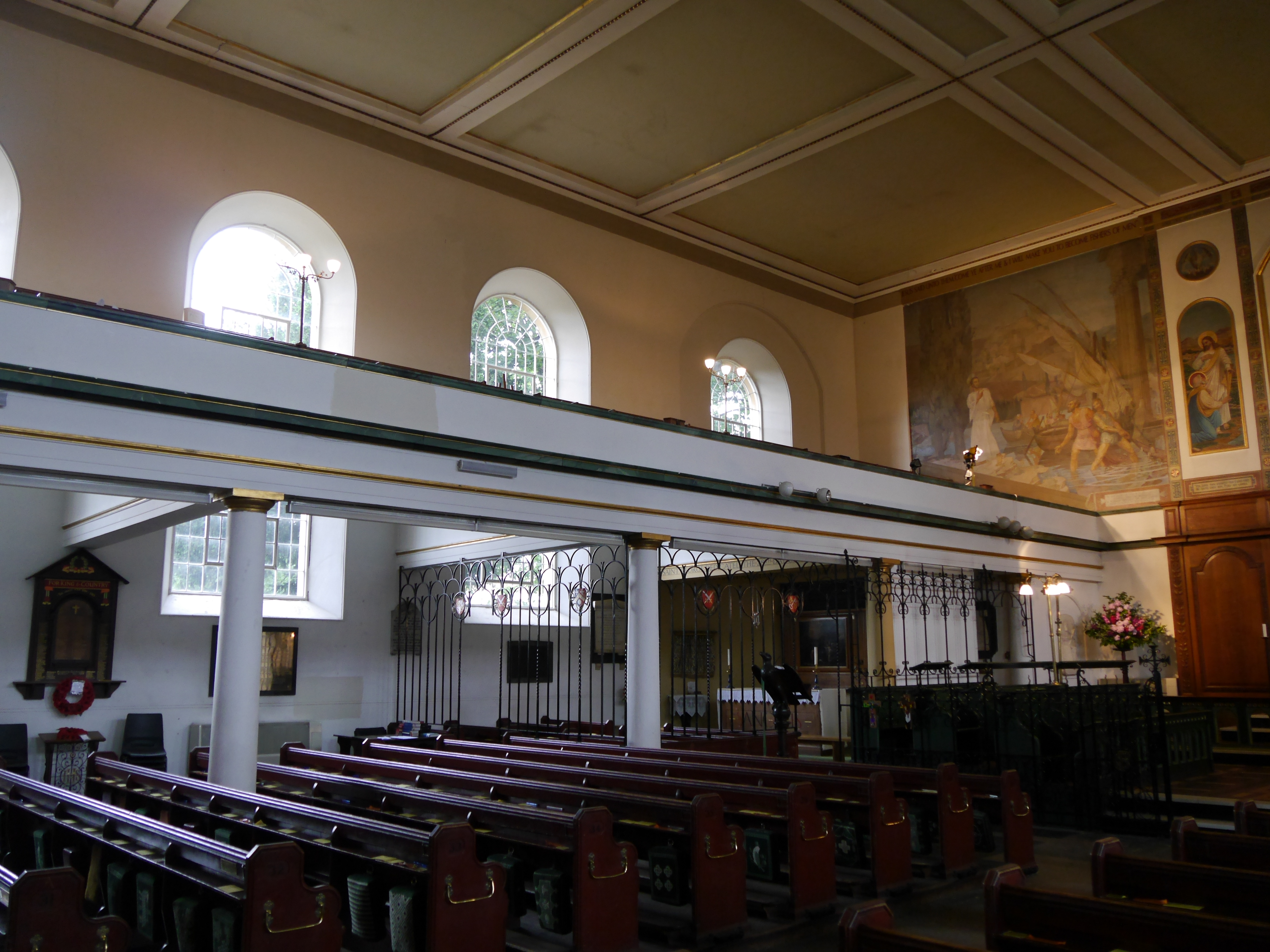
Interior

St Peter's, Hammersmith, is a Church of England parish church. It is a Grade II* listed church, and the oldest church in Hammersmith.

== History ==
When the church was built in the village of Hammersmith in 1829, all that surrounded it was meadows, market gardens and smallholdings. The area steadily increased in size and prosperity due to the close proximity to the River Thames which was an important trading area.

The London Gazette of 8 November 1836 defined the boundaries of the St Peter's District thus:

It is bounded on the west by the Parish of Chiswick; on the south by the River Thames, the Creek and the High Bridge. Worple Way is towards the southern extremity of Waterloo Street; on the east northwardly Waterloo Street, including the west side of that street; then westward, by King's Street, that is the Turnpike Road leading from London to Brentford, as far as Webb's Lane, as far as Gould Hawke Road; and on the north by Gould Hawke Road until the said ancient road terminates in Chiswick parish at Stamford Brook.

The site of the church was donated by George Scott, born in 1780 to a wealthy family in Hammersmith. In 1807 he married Hannah Lucy Stoe, the daughter of another wealthy local family who brought as her marriage settlement the sum of £5,000, a large portion of land south of Ravenscourt Park and the land around Black Lion Lane (now St Peter's Square). By the 1820s Scott was deeply involved in the religious, social and business life of Hammersmith. He was a well-known and respected magistrate who provided generously to the causes of his poorer neighbours.

Although George Scott donated the site, substantial financial contributions were provided by Doctor Horsley who was the Bishop of London (£250) and the Revd William Wood the Rector and Vicar of Fulham, (£500).

The church is what is known as a Commissioners' church, as it received a grant from the Church Building Commission towards its cost. The full cost was £12,099 (equivalent to £1,150,000 in 2025), towards which the Commission paid £9,099. It is a Grade II* listed building. The first stone was laid on 16 May 1827, and the Church was consecrated on 15 October 1829.

== Description ==
The architect was Edward Lapidge, born in Hampton Wick in 1793. His father, Samuel Lapidge, was a landscape gardener working at Hampton Court as an assistant to Lancelot (Capability) Brown.

In 1823, Edward Lapidge was finalist in a competition to design a set of new buildings for King's College, Cambridge. In 1835 he was a finalist again in a competition to design the Fitzwilliam Museum. His completed works include Hampton Wick Church (1829), the rebuilding of Hampton Church (1830), St Mary's Church, Putney (1836) and the enlargement of Fulham Church (1839). In 1852 he designed Reigate Police Station. He exhibited at the Royal Academy between 1808 and 1850. He died in 1860 and is buried at Hampton Wick Church.

The church is in the classical style, using the Ionic order, with tower and lobbies at the western end. The building is of brick with a limited amount of stone dressing. At the west end is a four-columned portico with stone columns and pediment, set into the brick wall of the church. The tower is of stone, on an octagonal brick pedestal. The interior space is not divided into aisles and nave, but has galleries on three sides, supported on Doric columns. It was intended to accommodate 1,691 worshippers, 691 of them in free seats. Describing the church in 1831, the Gentleman's magazine concluded " Taken as a whole, this Church presents a very fair specimen of modern Grecian architecture. The tower has considerable merit. The design is novel and pleasing, and the proportions are harmonious. The interior is however chaste and formal, displaying even a presbyterian nakedness, the dullness of which is increased by the purple furniture of the altar."

The carved eagle lectern was presented by the then churchwarden Major C.E.A. Cotes in 1878 in the memory of his nephew, a former curate at the church.

In 1887 the interior of the church was redecorated under the advice of William Morris, who lived locally. In the same year the old, high-sided pews were replaced with more modern seating.

The stone font was moved from its original position at the back of the church and is now sited in the middle, beside the southern aisle and is frequently in use for baptisms.

The most recent additions to the decorations of the church are the murals, which cover the east wall above the galleries, painted in 1932. They depict Saint Peter being called by Jesus Christ, and the apostle preaching in Jerusalem on the day of Pentecost.

When built, St Peter's Church had a single bell, cast at the Whitechapel Bell Foundry and inscribed 'Edward Mears fecit, London 1828'. In 1916, four more bells were cast by Mears and Stainbank to provide a ring of five.

When the Great West Road was built in 1957 the Church lost a significant portion of its land, including that with graves. These were moved to St Paul's Church, in the centre of Hammersmith. There is one headstone remaining on the south side of the church and thirty on the north side. All of the graves inscriptions are now indecipherable, except for the one on the south side.

St Peter's Church is linked to St Bartholomew's Cathedral Church, Messumba, Mozambique.

== See also ==
- List of churches and cathedrals of London
- List of Commissioners' churches in London
