= Lifschutz Davidson Sandilands =

British architectural firm

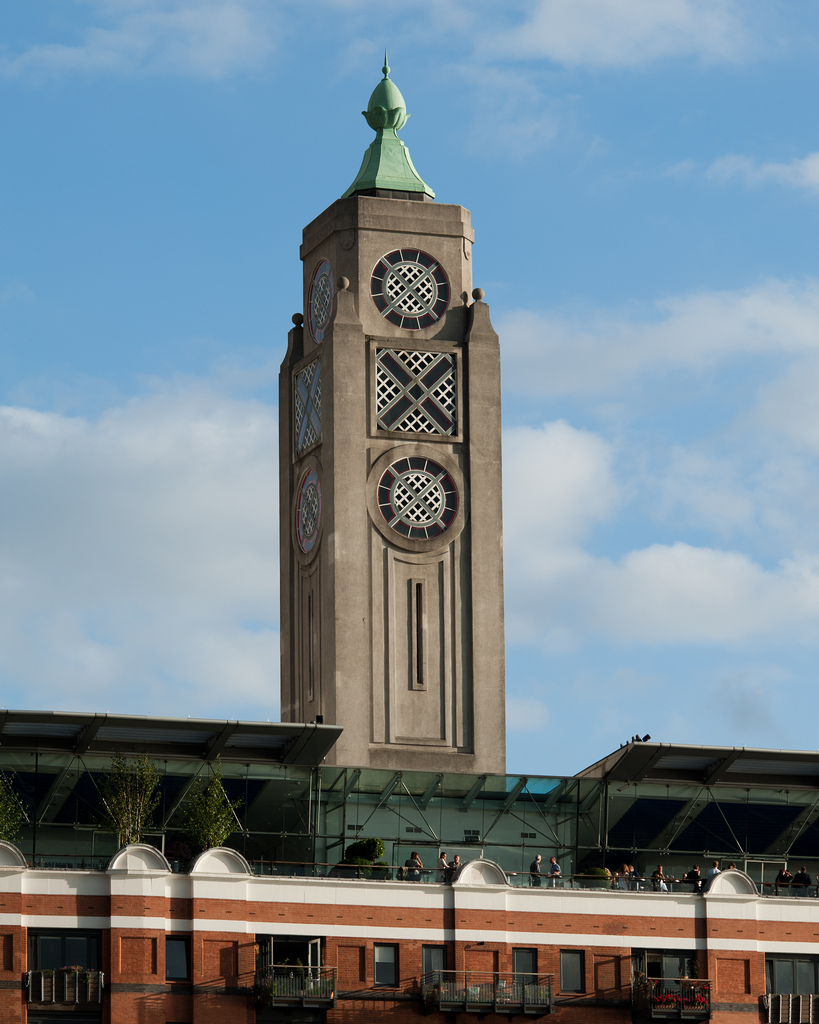
- OXO Tower viewed from the north bank of the Thames

Practice information
- Key architects: Alex Lifschutz, director Paul Sandilands, director
- Founded: 1986

Significant works and honors
- Buildings: OXO Tower (1997); Royal Victoria Dock Bridge (1998); Golden Jubilee Bridges (2002), Fit-out of La Rinascente Department Store, Milan (2007); Bonhams (2013); JW3 (2013)

Lifschutz Davidson Sandilands is a practice of architects, urban designers and masterplanners established in 1986 and practising out of London.

== History ==
Alex Lifschutz and Ian Davidson met working on the Hong Kong and Shanghai Bank Headquarters for Foster and Partners, and formed Lifschutz Davidson in 1986. The practice became resident in Richard Rogers' Thames Wharf Studios in 1989 having collaborated on the roof extension, and became well known in the 1990s for work on London's South Bank with the Coin Street Community Builders, including the OXO Tower and Broadwall social housing.

After the death of Ian Davidson in 2003 the practice became Lifschutz Davidson Sandilands with Paul Sandilands as Director. It moved to the former Island Records home in St Peter's Square, Hammersmith, purchasing the building from the then owners of Island, Universal Music, and converting the former Royal Laundry to a large open-plan studio.

In 2009, the practice's master plan for the reconstruction of Ferrier Estate was approved.

In 2013, the practice finalised designing a new auction house for Bonhams in London, and has also collaborated with the auction company in New York and Hong Kong. Additionally, it worked on a new sustainable suburb at Kidbrooke in South London, and a high-profile residential tower with public swimming pool and leisure centre on the South Bank for Coin Street Community Builders.

The practice was part of Team Populous, the official overlay architecture services provider for the London 2012 Olympics, led by Populous and comprising a consortium made up of Lifschutz Davidson Sandilands and Allies and Morrison.

In August 2011 Delancey and Qatari Diar, working with Lifschutz Davidson Sandilands, beat rival developers to purchase the 2,800-home London 2012 Olympics Athletes’ Village in Stratford.

In May 2017 the firm completed the University of Birmingham Sport and Fitness building that went on to win a national RIBA award.

Ongoing projects range from a masterplan for 11,000 homes at Barking Riverside, to the first building for UCL in East London and a public art project lighting 15 Thames bridges with the American artist Leo Villareal.

== Notable projects ==
- Offices at Thames Wharf, London (1991)
- Riverwalk, Southbank, London (1992)
- Sainsbury's, Canley (1994)
- Broadwall Housing, South Bank, London (1994)
- Sainsbury's, Watford (1995)
- Oxo Tower Wharf, South Bank, London (1996)
- Royal Victoria Dock Bridge, London (1998)
- Sainsbury's, Deal (1998)
- Golden Jubilee Bridges, London (1998)
- Harvey Nichols restaurant, Edinburgh (2002)
- Harvey Nichols restaurant, Knightsbridge, London (2002)
- Davidson Building, Covent Garden, London (2003)
- Asticus Building, St James, London (2006)
- Fit-out for La Rinascente, Milan, Italy (2006)
- Island Studios, Chiswick, London (2007)
- Charlotte Building, Gresse Street, London (2009)
- Tsvetnoy Central Market, Moscow (2010)
- Kidbrooke Village Masterplan, replacing the former Ferrier Estate, London (ongoing)
- Teenage Cancer Trust Ward, Birmingham (2010)
- University College London masterplan, London (2011)
- N02 and N14, residential blocks on the Athletes Village, London (2011)
- Trams in Luxembourg City
- Jewish Community Centre for London – "JW3" (2013)
- Headquarters for Bonhams auctioneers, London (2013) – longlisted for the 2015 Stirling Prize.
- Foyles flagship store, Charing Cross Road, London (2014) – longlisted for the 2015 Stirling Prize.
- Fitzroy Place, the former Middlesex Hospital site, Fitzrovia, London (on site)
- The University of Birmingham's New Indoor Sports Facility, Birmingham (on site)
- La Rinascente, Rome, Italy (on site)
- Offices and station at Hanover Square (on site)
- Esders and Scheefhaals building "Au Pont Rouge", St Petersburg, Russia (on site)
- Masterplan for Chelsea F.C. with Herzog & de Meuron (current)
- The Illuminated River, London, (2017)

== Awards ==
The practice has won many awards for architecture and design, including:

- Eight RIBA Awards, four Royal Fine Arts Commission Awards including Building of the Year for Broadwall Housing.
- Seven Civic Trust Awards and "Office Architect of the Year" from Building Design in 2011.
- In 2012 the practice's Tsvetnoy Central Market project won the Society of British Interior Design inaugural Best Interior Design Award.
- Vogue Russia's Store of the Year.
- Interior Design Magazine's award for best retail interior.
- In 2014 the JW3 reached the midlist for the RIBA Stirling Prize.
