= Architecture of London =

Overview of the architecture in London

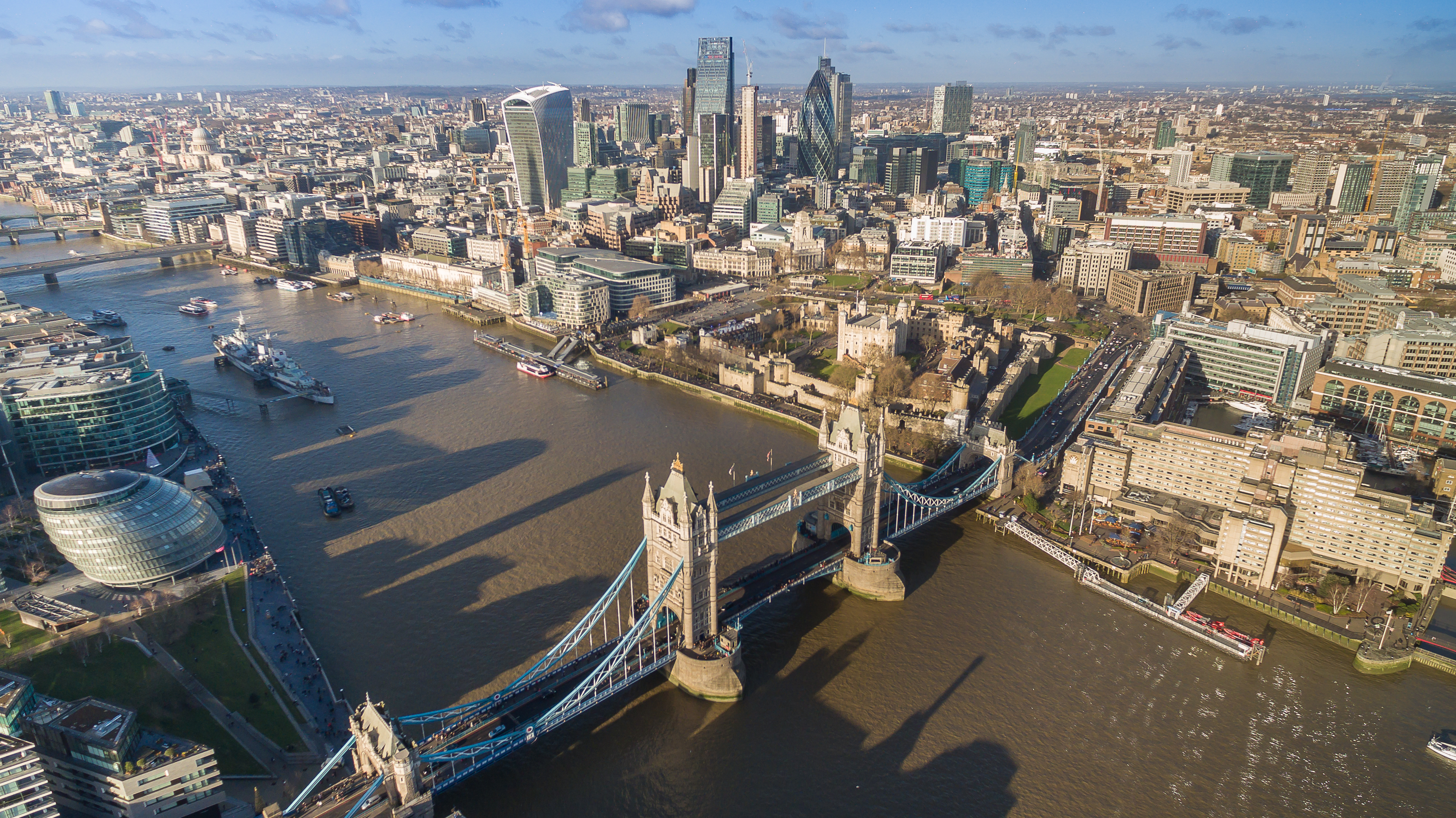
A view of the City of London, with Tower Bridge, The Tower of London and modern high-rise such as 30 St Mary Axe buildings in the background

London's architectural heritage consists of buildings from a very wide variety of styles and historical periods, with no one of these being dominant. London's distinctive architectural eclecticism stems from its long history, continual redevelopment, destruction by the Great Fire of London and the Blitz, and state recognition of private property rights which have limited large-scale state planning. This sets London apart from other European capitals such as Paris and Rome which are more architecturally homogeneous as a result of being largely rebuilt in neoclassical styles during the 16th-19th centuries. London's diverse architecture ranges from the Romanesque central keep of the Tower of London, the great Gothic church of Westminster Abbey, the Palladian royal residence Queen's House, Christopher Wren's Baroque masterpiece St Paul's Cathedral, the High Victorian Gothic of the Palace of Westminster, the industrial Art Deco of Battersea Power Station, the post-war Modernism of the Barbican Estate and the Postmodern skyscraper 30 St Mary Axe, also known as "the Gherkin".

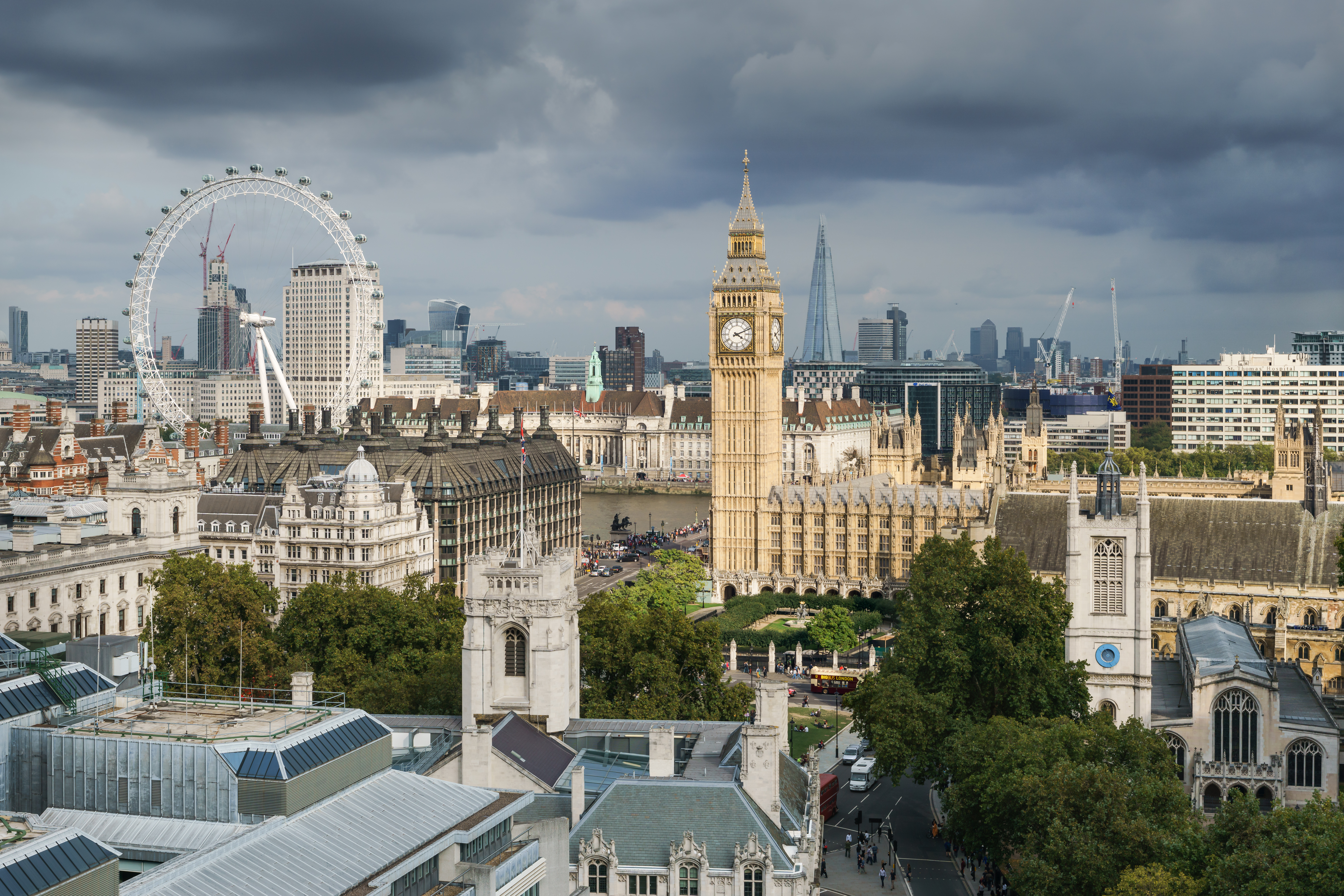
A view of Westminster, with the Palace of Westminster in the foreground, the London Eye in the mid-ground and high rise buildings like The Shard in the background

After the Roman withdrawal from Britain in the 5th century AD, the layout of the Roman settlement governed the plan of the Saxon and medieval city. This core of London is known as the City of London, while Westminster, the ancient centre of political power, lies to the west. Relatively few medieval structures survive due to the city's near-total destruction in the Great Fire of London in 1666, with exceptions such as the Tower of London, Westminster Abbey, Westminster Hall, Guildhall, St James's Palace, Lambeth Palace and some Tudor buildings. After the Great Fire, London was rebuilt and greatly modernised under the direction of the baroque architect Sir Christopher Wren, with the new St Paul's Cathedral as its centrepiece.

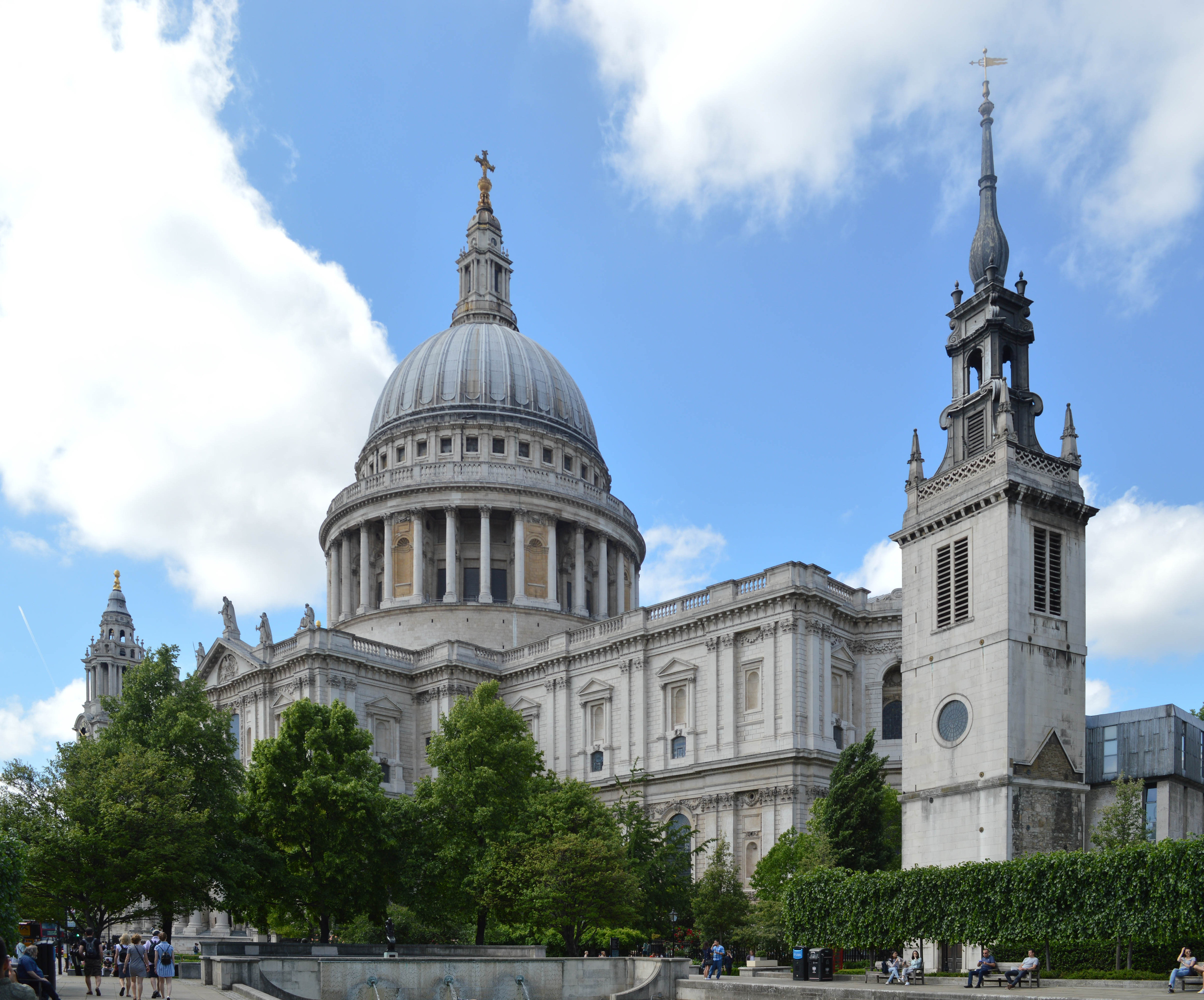
St Paul's Cathedral (1710) by Christopher Wren, which was the centrepiece of the city's reconstruction after The Great Fire of London of 1666

After a period of dramatic expansion in the 18th and 19th centuries, London reached its zenith as the world's largest and populous city from 1831 to 1925, becoming the capital of the British Empire at its greatest extent and power. In this period London sprawled vastly beyond its historical boundaries, absorbing many formerly rural settlements and creating vast suburbs. The city was further transformed by the Industrial Revolution as infrastructure projects like the West India Docks, the Regent's Canal, intercity railway termini like Paddington Station and the world's first underground railway system set London apart as the pre-eminent city of the industrial age.

London endured significant destruction during The Blitz of World War II, leading to approximately 1.5 million people being made homeless. This led to the construction of many modernist housing estates in The Post-War period. Some of these were built in a distinctive brutalist style such as at The Barbican Estate and Trellick Tower. London also declined economically in this period, with many former industrial areas fall into dereliction. However, in the 1980s onwards, largely as a result of a re-surgent economy based around financial services, areas like the Isle of Dogs were re-vitalised with the development of substantial new office buildings such as One Canada Square (1991) one of London's first true skyscrapers.

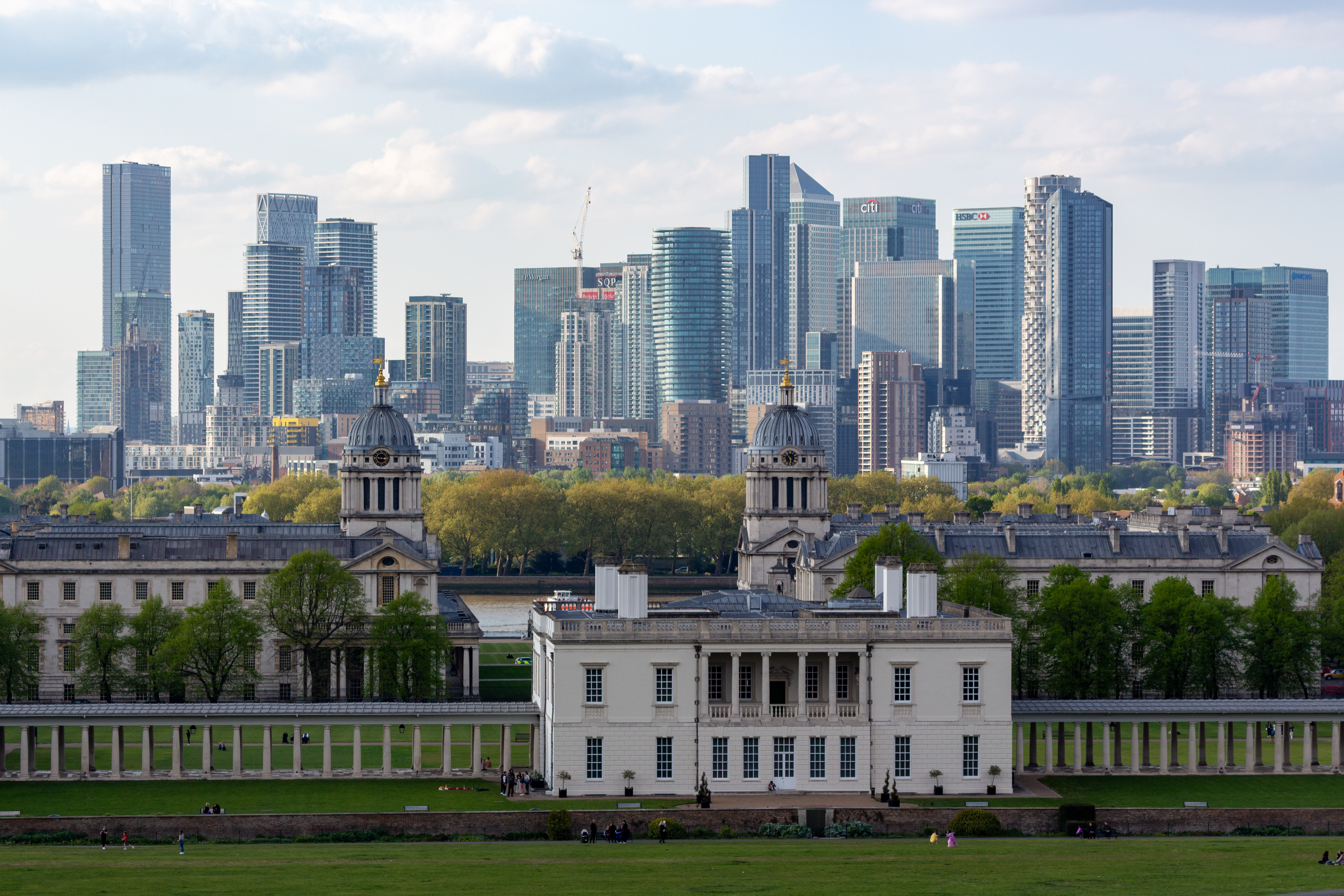
Queen's House (1616) by Inigo Jones and Old Royal Naval College (1692) by Christopher Wren, with numerous modern high-rise buildings of The Canary Wharf Cluster in the background

Throughout most of London's history, the height of buildings has been restricted. These restrictions gradually eroded in the post-war period (except those protecting certain views of St Paul's Cathedral). High-rise buildings have become more numerous since, particularly in the 21st century. Skyscrapers are now numerous in the City of London financial district and Canary Wharf: a new financial district created in the 1980s and 1990s in the former London docklands area of the Isle of Dogs. Examples of such buildings include the 1980s skyscraper Tower 42, the radical Lloyd's building by Richard Rogers, One Canada Square: the centre piece of the Canary Wharf district and 30 St Mary Axe (nicknamed "the Gherkin") which set a precedent for other recent high-rise developments to be built in a similar high-tech style. Renzo Piano's The Shard completed in 2012 set a significant milestone by becoming London's first 'supertall' skyscraper due to its exceeding 1000 ft (304.8m) in height.

== Prehistoric ==
Although no pre-Roman settlement is known, there were prehistoric crossing points at Deptford and Vauxhall Bridge, and some prehistoric remains are known from archaeology of the River Thames. It is likely that the course of Watling Street follows a more ancient pathway. Ancient Welsh legend claims the city of the Trinovantes – dedicated to the god Lud (Caer Llud) – was founded by the followers of Brân the Blessed, whose severed head is said to be buried under the White Tower facing the continent.

== Roman London (60–500 CE) ==
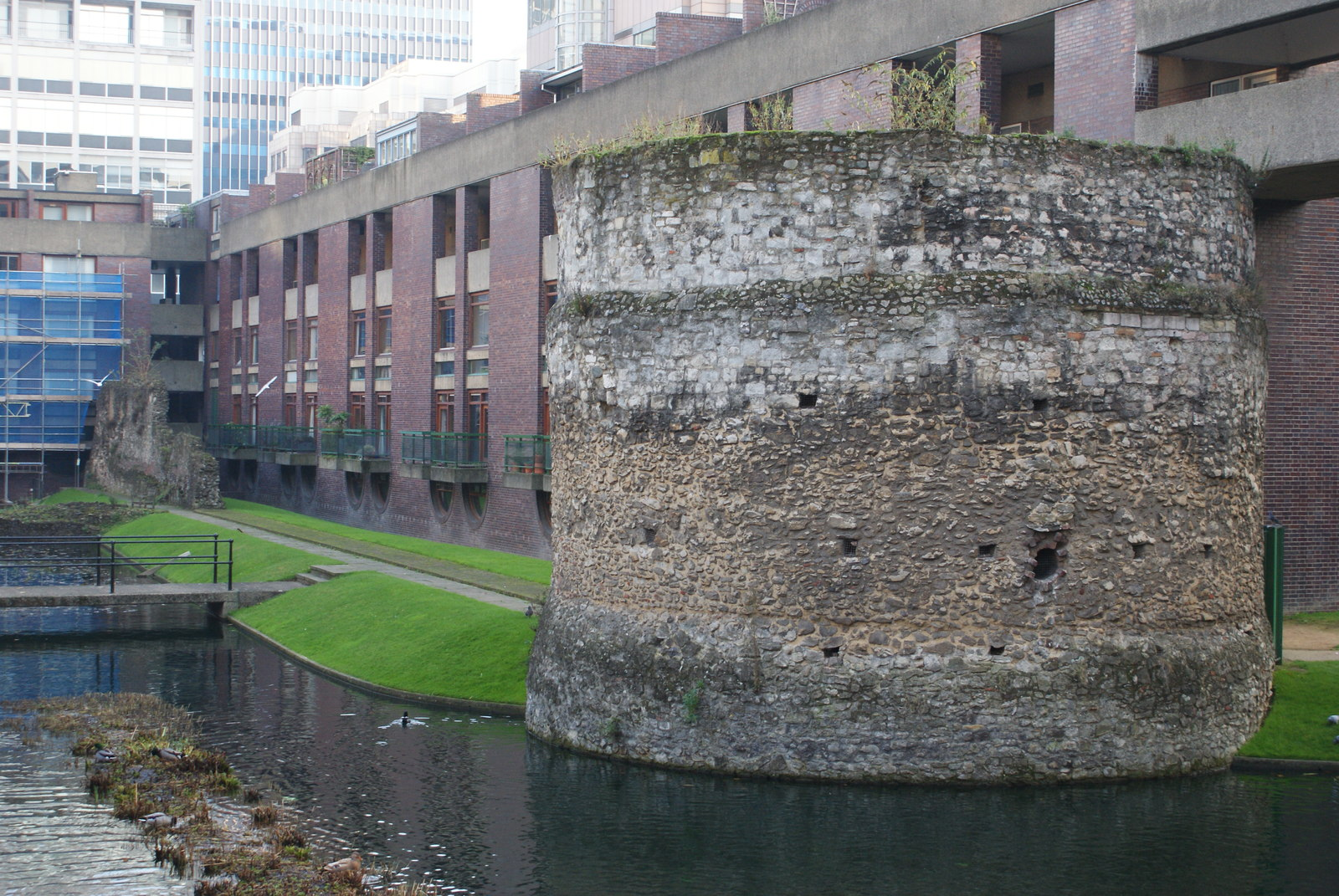
Surviving bastion from London Wall in the Barbican Estate, with Roman masonry at the base (c. 2nd century) and latter medieval additions above (c. 13th century)

Londinium was initially founded as a military trading port, while the first capital of the province was at Camulodunum. But after the Boudican Revolt of 61, when both cities were razed to the ground, the capital was removed to London, which rapidly grew to pre-eminence with the establishment of a Forum and a provincial Praetorium. The city was originally laid out to a classical plan like many other cities in Britannia and throughout Europe, in a roughly rectangular form with the south side formed by the River Thames, and divided into blocks of insulae. Two east–west streets (now Cheapside and Lower Thames Street) led from Newgate and Ludgate to form the cardo, presumably leading to a lost gate (or gates) at the present location of the Tower of London with the road to Canterbury and Dover. An extension of Watling Street formed the decumanus maximus, crossing the river from Billingsgate over the ancient London Bridge to Southwark and the south coast road beyond. The Forum was located at the current site of Leadenhall Market, and is said to have been the largest building north of the Alps in ancient times; remains can still be visited in the basement of some of the market shops.

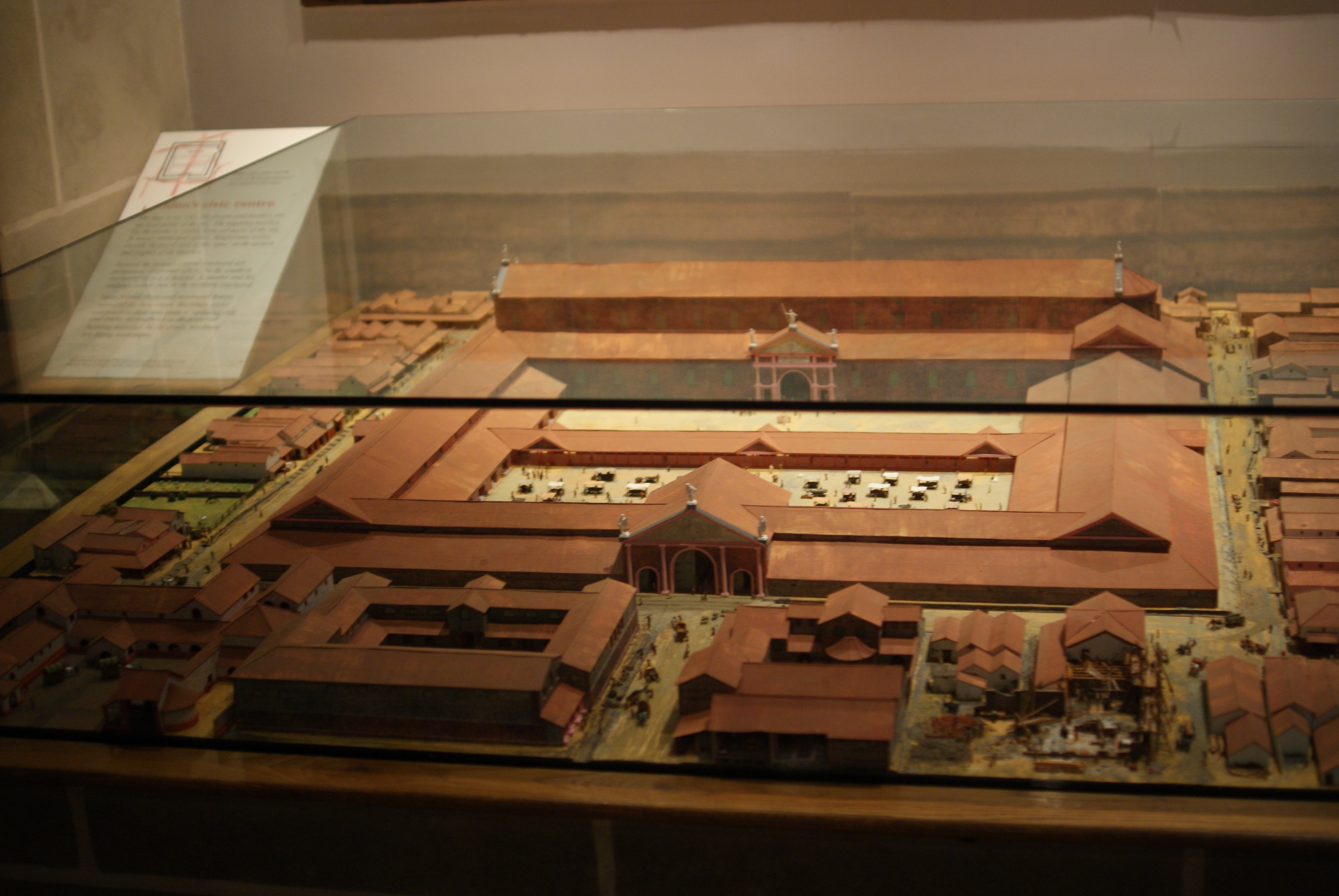
A speculative model of the central forum of Londinium at The Museum of London

The rectangular walled and gridded city was soon extended to the west over the River Walbrook, north towards marshy Moorfields and east to the area later known as Minories. A Romano-British tomb sculpture of an eagle was found there in 2013, suggesting that the Minories lay outside the city boundary in the early second century. Part of the amphitheatre remains beneath the London Guildhall square; a Roman bathing complex is accessible in the basement of 100 Lower Thames Street. The square Castrum was located at the north-east of the city at the Barbican, close to the Museum of London where part of the Roman London Wall remains. For centuries afterward, distances from London were reckoned from the London Stone, once claimed to be a fragment of masonry from the ancient Thames-side Praetorium. Late Roman private houses of leading Christians are thought to have been the foundation of the earliest churches; mosaic remains in the crypt at All Hallows by the Tower and perhaps some at St Paul's Cathedral.

== The Middle Ages: Romanesque, Gothic and Tudor (1066–1603) ==
After the Roman abandonment of Britain in the 5^{th}-century, the approximate format of the Roman city of Londinium continued to form the structural basis of London’s medieval core now known as The City of London, from which the entire modern-day city initially expanded. Little remains of London's medieval architecture due to the city's near-complete destruction in the Great Fire of London of 1666, but a handful of scattered survivors as well as other records provide a vivid picture of the London’s architectural character in this period. From the beginning of The Middle Ages until the late 16^{th} century, London lay predominantly within the boundaries of its city walls that were originally built by The Romans – the area now known as the City of London – with Westminster being a separate smaller settlement to the west. These city walls were continually repaired and enhanced throughout the Middle Ages, functioning as the city’s primary means of defence. These walls contained seven main fortified gates: Aldersgate, Aldgate, Bishopsgate, Cripplegate, Ludgate, Moorgate and Newgate, the last of which also functioning as an infamous prison. But during the 18th century most of the city walls were demolished to facilitate the dramatic expansion of the city in an era in which they were no longer necessary. Small fragments of these walls still survive in places such as The Barbican and London Wall.

Long View of London from Bankside, a panorama of London by Wenceslaus Hollar, 1647, notable for being rendered all from one viewpoint

By the late 16th-century there was substantial development outside of London's city walls, such as along The Strand, in Lincoln's Inn Fields, in Smithfield – and on the south bank of the Thames at Southwark, with London Bridge connecting the latter to the rest of the city to the north. Being the only bridge across the Thames within the city, London Bridge was an exceptionally significant structure that connected London to the economically, politically and religiously significant areas in the South-East of England such as Canterbury, the most important site of pilgrimage in late medieval England. The earliest record of London bridge dates from the 10th century, a structure probably built of wood, but the best-known incarnation was constructed between 1176 and 1209. This was a stone bridge 900 ft wide with 19 arches, complete with its own street of shops, houses, a chapel and a drawbridge in the centre to allow large boat traffic to pass through. The buildings on the bridge were eventually demolished in 1761 and this medieval incarnation of the bridge which survived for over six centuries was finally replaced by a far more uniform classical style design in 1831. With only one bridge for the entire middle-ages, the river Thames was the main means of transportation within the city, as well as providing access to overseas trade by sea; many wharves and quays lined its north bank.

=== Romanesque and Gothic ===
Many of medieval London's most significant structures were initially constructed by the Normans in the late 11th and 12th-century. Although it is a common mis-conception that the Norman's brought the Romanesque style of architecture to England — the Anglo-Saxons had already built several substantial churches in the style, most notably the first Westminster Abbey in 1052 — Romanesque buildings built in England after 1066 were far more ambitious in terms of size and style, as well as far more numerous in terms of the number of buildings commissioned. Almost immediately after their conquest of England the Normans built several fortresses along the River Thames in the center of London to consolidate their power within the city, most notably the Tower of London which survives today. The White Tower, the central keep of the complex, was completed in the 1080s in a Romanesque style and was the tallest building in the city. It served multiple functions: a fortress, prison, the seats of government and a royal residence for William the Conqueror. One of the oldest and least altered Romanesque churches in England is also built inside the White Tower: the chapel of St John's. The only other surviving Romanesque church in central London is St Bartholomew-the-Great in Smithfield, the remains of a much larger priory church founded in 1123. The Tower of London complex reached its approximate current format with two outer defensive walls by the end of the 13th century.

The Tower of London

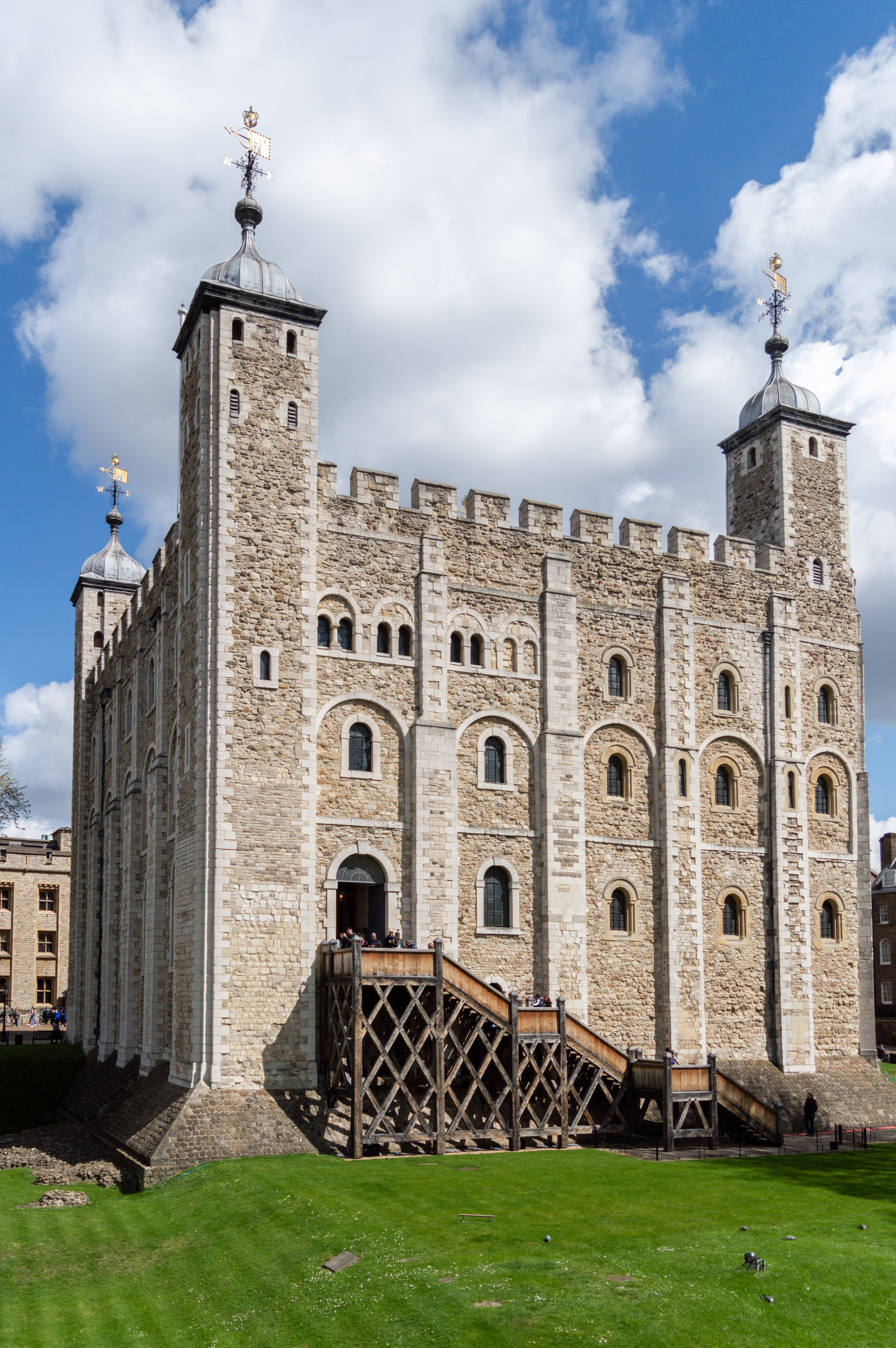
The White Tower (1080) the central keep of The Tower of London.

St.John's Chapel Tower of London (1080): one of the oldest and least altered Romanesque churches in Britain.

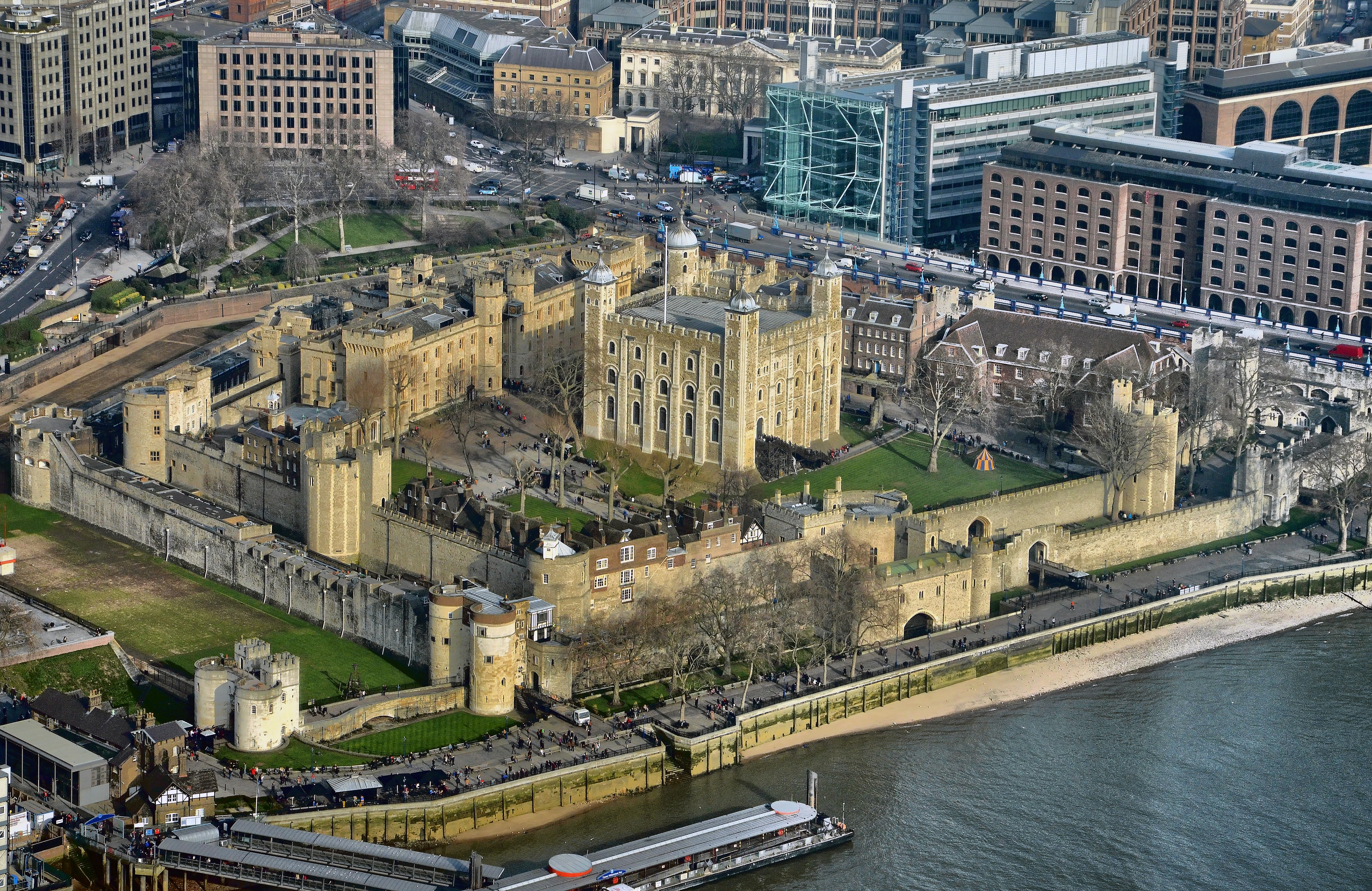
An aerial view of the Tower of London: showing the two outer walls which were built during the 13th-century.

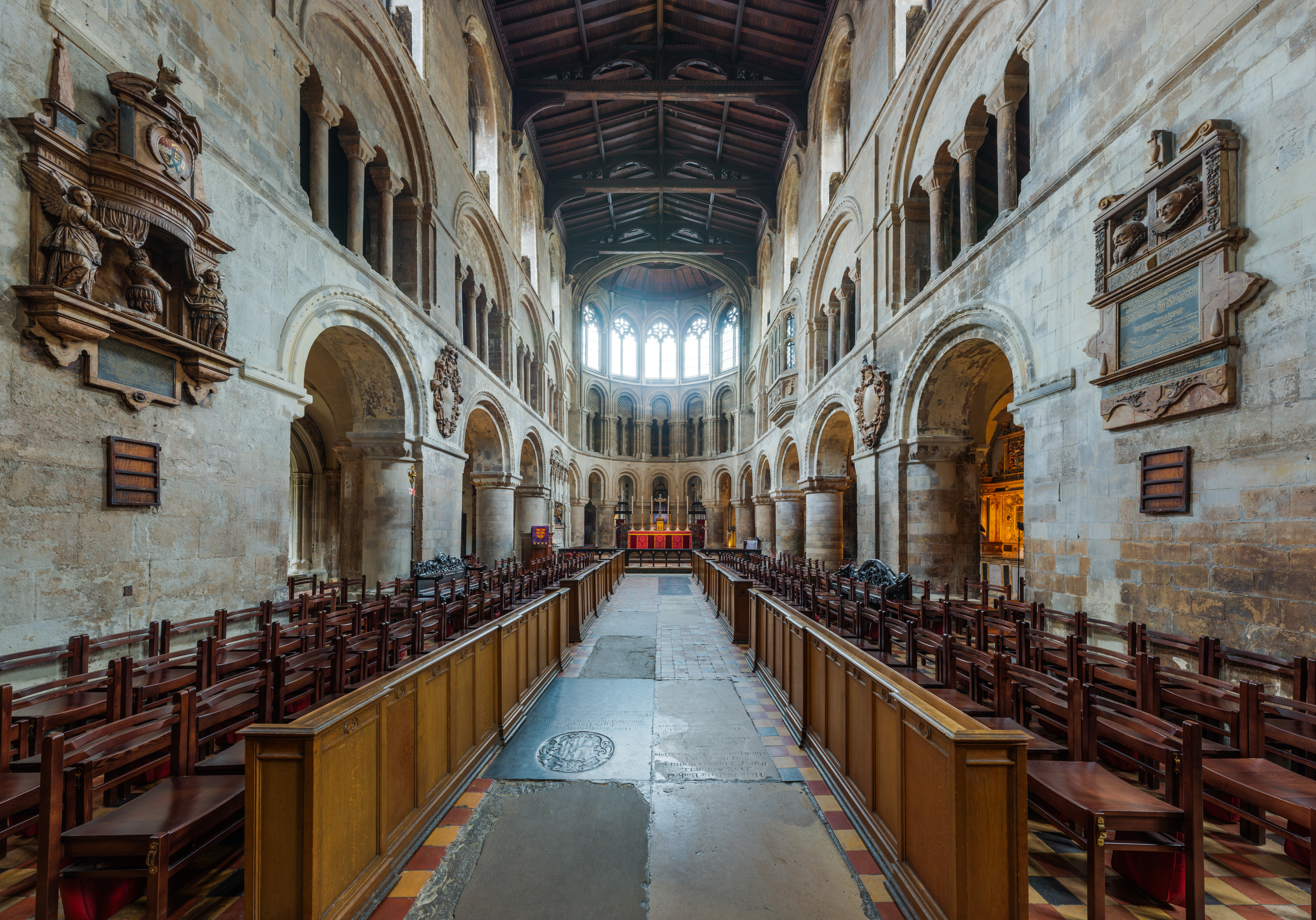
St Bartholomew-the-Great (1123), a very rare example of a Norman church in The City of London

Another significant London structure initially constructed by the Normans was Westminster Hall. The first incarnation of this was completed in 1097 during the reign of William II, the centerpiece of the Palace of Westminster which was built as a royal residence. Whereas previously William the Conqueror had lived at the Tower of London, the transplanting of the monarchy from the City of London to Westminster created a polarity between commerce and state which still persists to this day. This complex of buildings gradually expanded throughout the Middle Ages with later additions such as St. Stephen's Chapel (1297), a royal chapel built in a very ornate gothic style to rival Sainte-Chapelle in Paris, notable for the elaborate wall paintings of its interior. After being converted for use by parliament as a debating chamber, the chapel was mostly destroyed in the fire of 1834, with the exception of the crypt which has been converted into St Mary Undercroft.

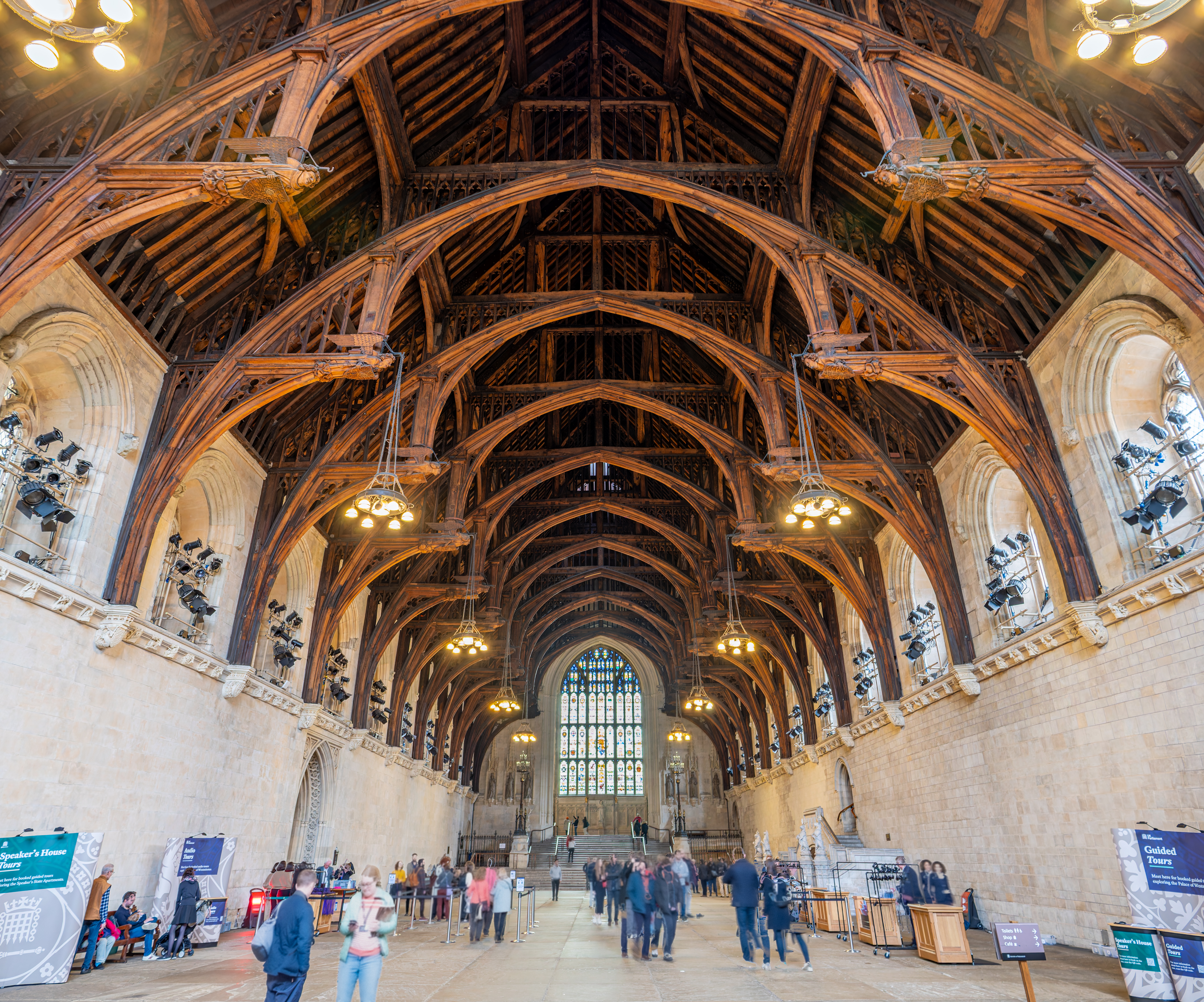
A view of the exceptionally wide-span hammerbeam roof of Westminster Hall added in the 14th-century

Westminster hall was radically altered and extended in the 14th-century becoming the largest hall of its kind in medieval Europe. During this extension an exceptionally wide span hammerbeam roof was added, likely by the King's Master Carpenter William Hurley which is now considered a marvel of medieval engineering, while the Norman outer walls were retained with the addition of gothic windows. Remarkably, Westminster Hall survives to this day, escaping the fire of 1834 which destroyed the remainder of the accompanying medieval structures. The hall was later incorporated into the neo-gothic incarnation of The Palace of Westminster. Other surviving examples of medieval halls in London can be found in the form of Guildhall (1440), which once served as London's city hall, although this was largely altered after the Great Fire and Old Hall of Lincoln's Inn (1492) which retains its original timber hammerbeam roof.

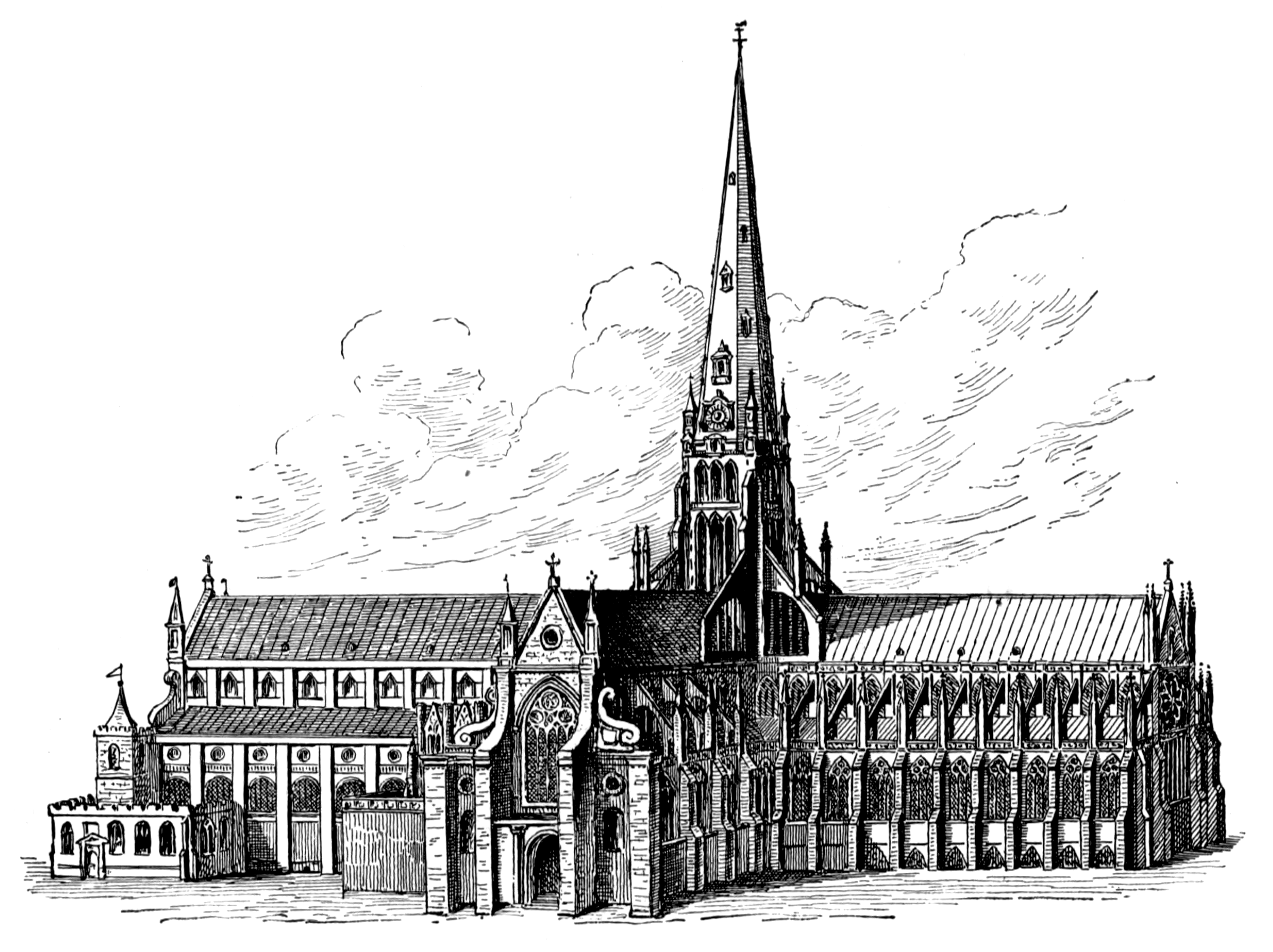
An idealized illustration of Old St. Paul's Cathedral. The nave was built in the Romanesque, with the remainder being both Early English and Decorated Gothic.

The Normans began the construction of Old St Paul's Cathedral on Ludgate Hill, replacing a Saxon timber-framed building which was destroyed by a fire in 1087. By the time of its completion in the 14th century the cathedral included elements of Gothic architecture, such as an ornate rose window in the Decorated Gothic style at the east end, alongside the Romanesque nave constructed during the Norman period. According to the architectural historian John Harvey, the octagonal chapter house, built about 1332 by William de Ramsey, was the earliest example of Perpendicular Gothic. The cathedral was one of the largest and tallest churches in medieval Europe; at one point it was crowned by an exceptionally tall spire similar to that of Salisbury Cathedral which was about 158 m (518 ft) high, although this was destroyed after being hit by lightning in the 16th century. Alongside the loss of its spire, the cathedral was generally in poor condition in the 16th century, with much of its ornate interior being destroyed during the reformation. Attempts were made to restore the cathedral in the 17th-century under the direction of Inigo Jones, but the church was latterly destroyed in the Great Fire and replaced by Sir Christopher Wren's incarnation of the cathedral, which retained its predecessor's Latin cross layout.

Westminster Abbey

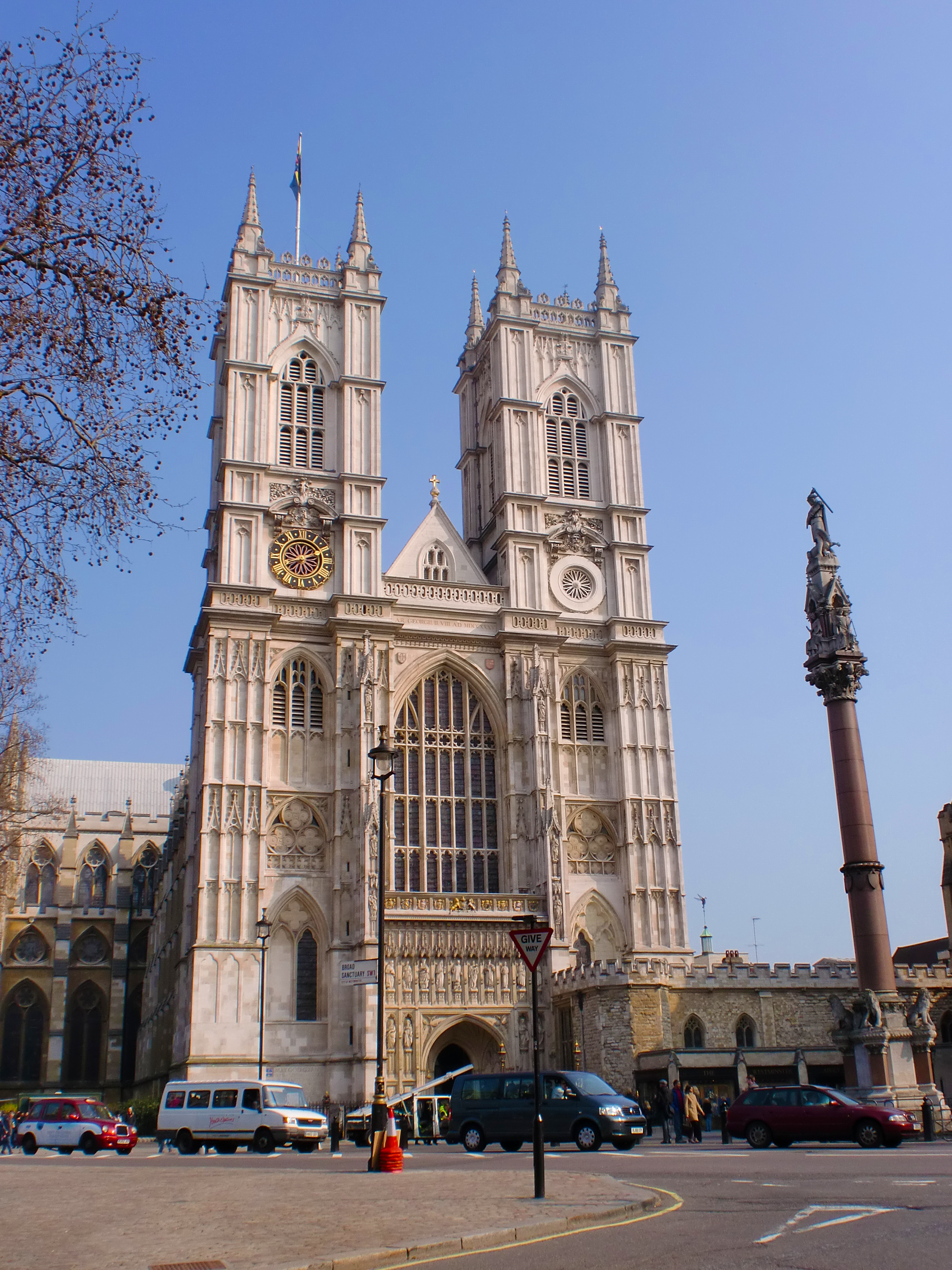
The West Front, the twin towers were added in the 18th-century.

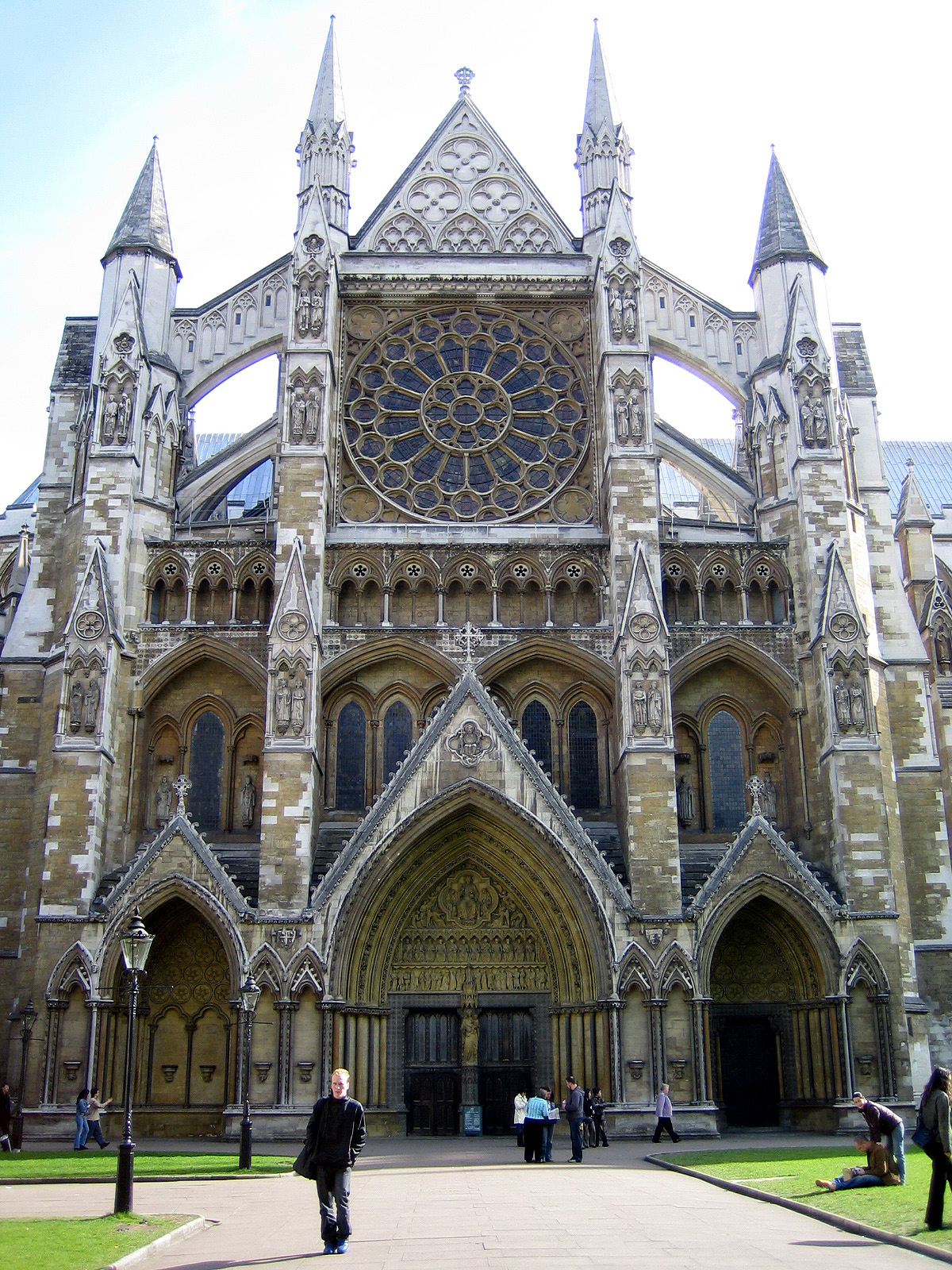
The North portal (13th-14th century) with a French style triple portal and ornate rose window.

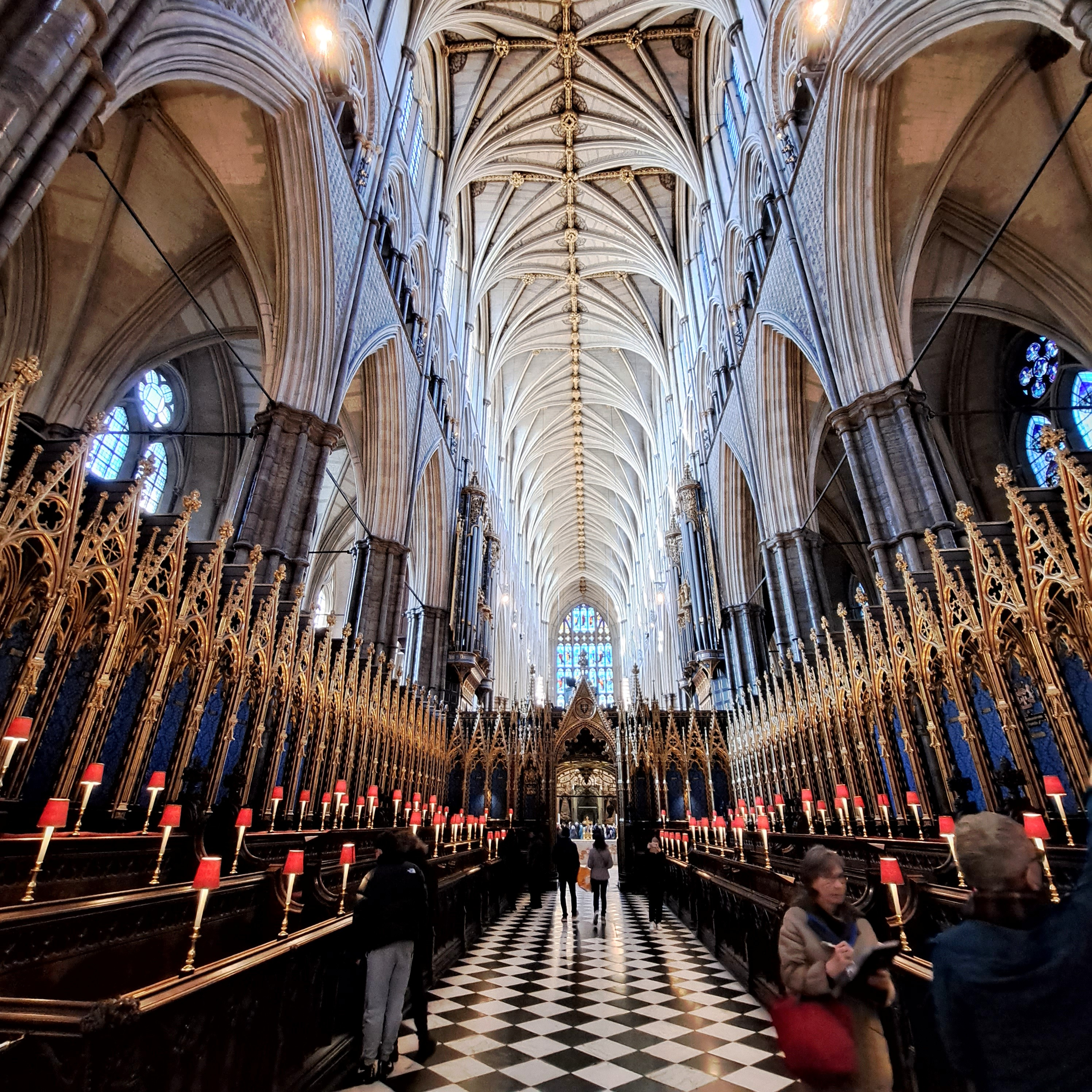
View of the nave looking northwards (c.13th-century) which is unusually tall for an English Gothic church.

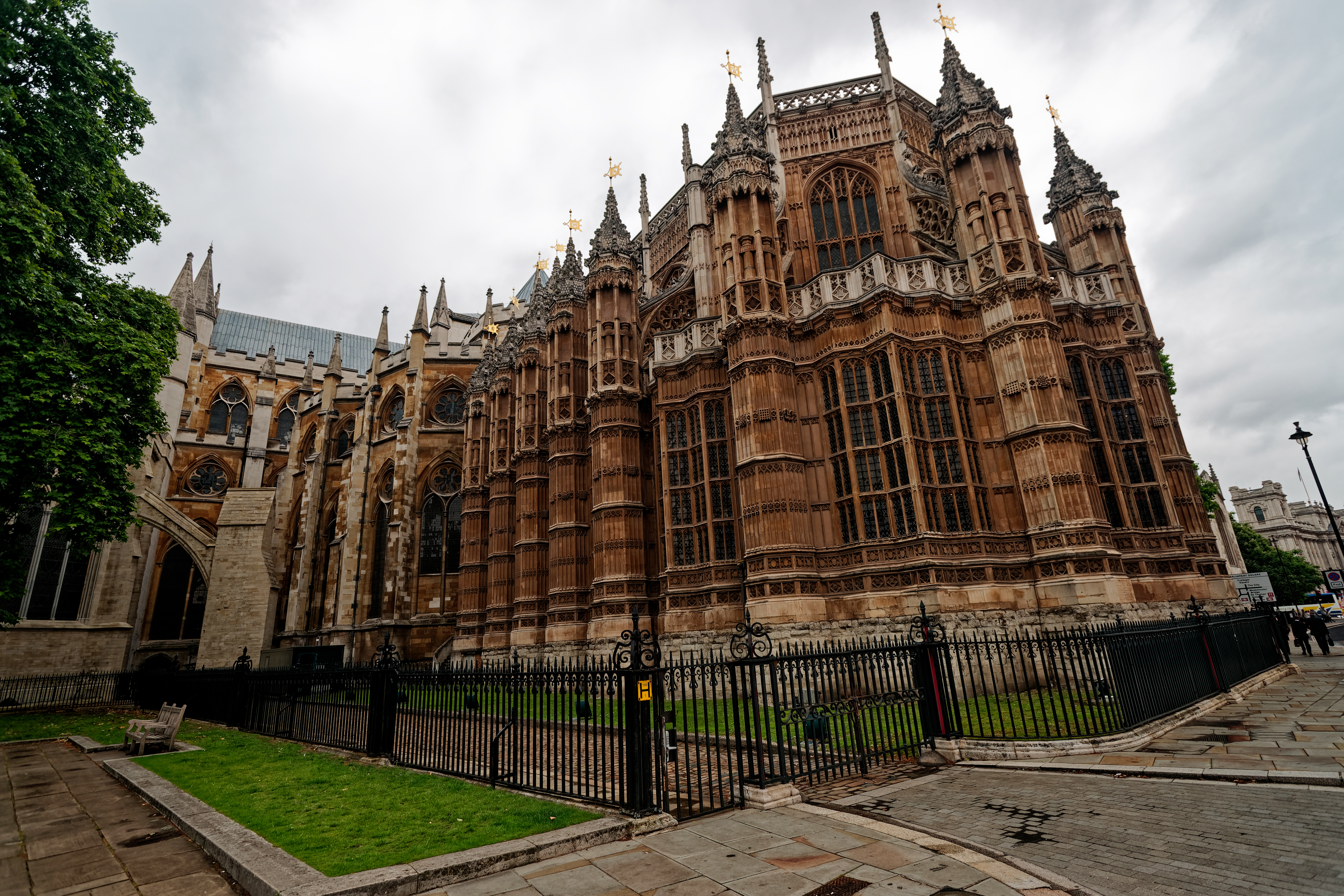
External view of The Henry VII Chapel (1516) built in an ornate Perpendicular Gothic Style.

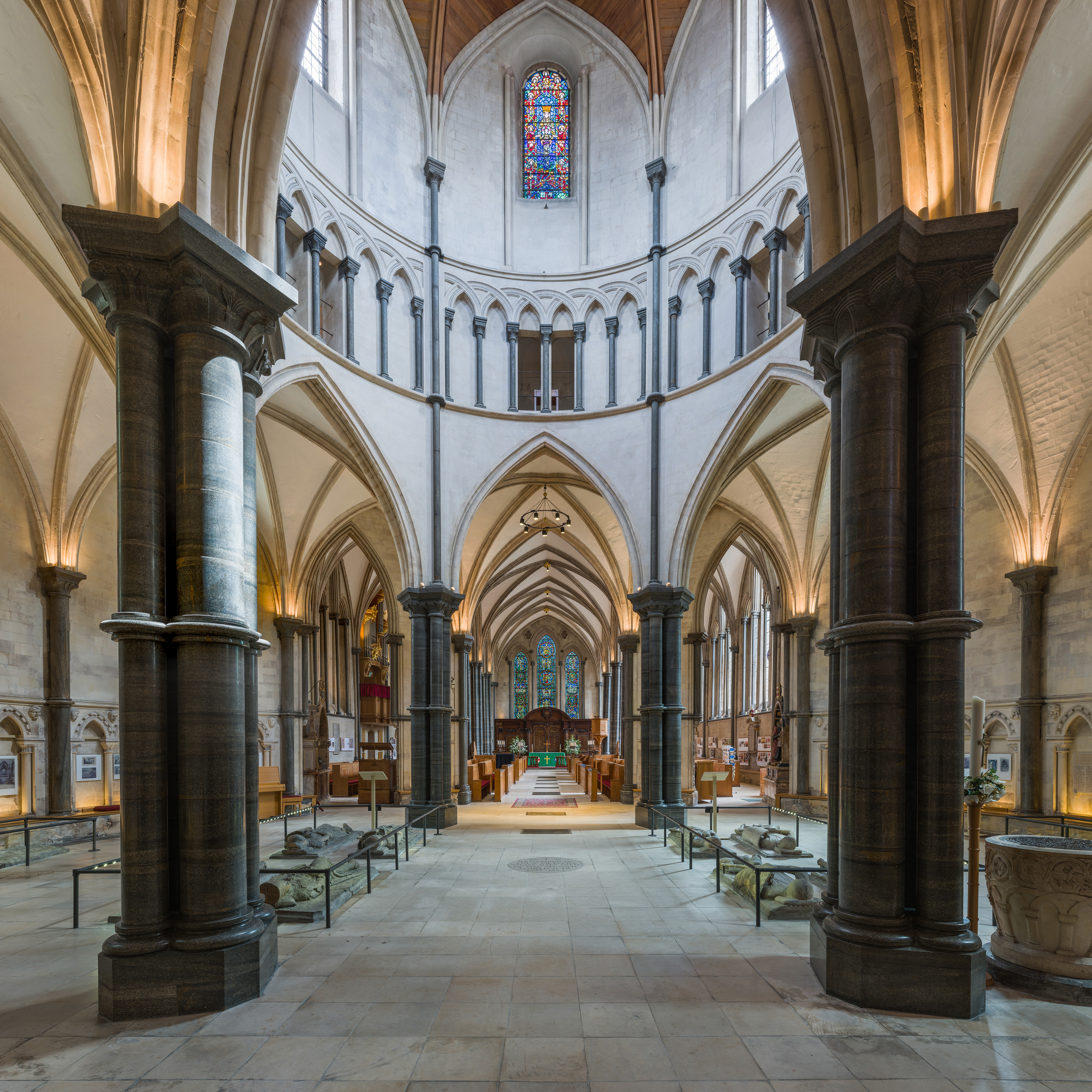
Temple Church (1185): a very rare example of an English round church, as well as one of the oldest Gothic churches in the whole of England.

London's other most important church: Westminster Abbey - the official church of The Monarchy - was rebuilt in the Gothic style in the 13th century during the reign of Henry III, who commissioned a substantial quantity of significant buildings during his reign. This produced the majority of the church which persists to this day, with only small fragments of the original Romanesque Saxon church surviving. The architecture of the abbey is very distinctive amongst England's large Gothic churches due its close resemblance to French Gothic Architecture of the period such as Reims Cathedral. The feature of Westminster Abbey which is particularly akin to French Gothic Architecture of the period is the exceptionally tall nave (which at 32m is the tallest in England), as well as large flying buttresses on the exterior and a typically French triple portal on the east front. These features have led to speculation that the master mason who built the abbey was French, although the intricate decoration of this church is distinctly English in character, with this abbey being arguably the first example of the Decorated Style of English Gothic. The most significant later addition to this Gothic incarnation of abbey was the Henry VII Chapel (late 15th to early 16th-century) which is highly notable for its exceptionally ornate fan vaulted ceiling.

Smaller medieval Gothic churches in Central London which still survive include Southwark Cathedral (a large former priory church which was greatly altered in the 19th-century), as well as a handful of other medieval churches in the City of London that escaped the Great Fire such as St Andrew Undershaft, St Etheldreda's Church, London, St Helen's Bishopsgate, St Olave's Church, Hart Street and St Sepulchre-without-Newgate. The most architecturally significant of these surviving churches is undoubtedley Temple Church; a very rare surviving example of an English round church which was affiliated to The Knights Templar; a powerful monastic order who built churches in this format to replicate The Church of the Holy Sepulchre in Jerusalem. In addition, due to being completed in a Gothic style at the exceptionally early date of 1185, this church may be the oldest surviving Gothic church in the whole of England.

=== Tudor and vernacular ===
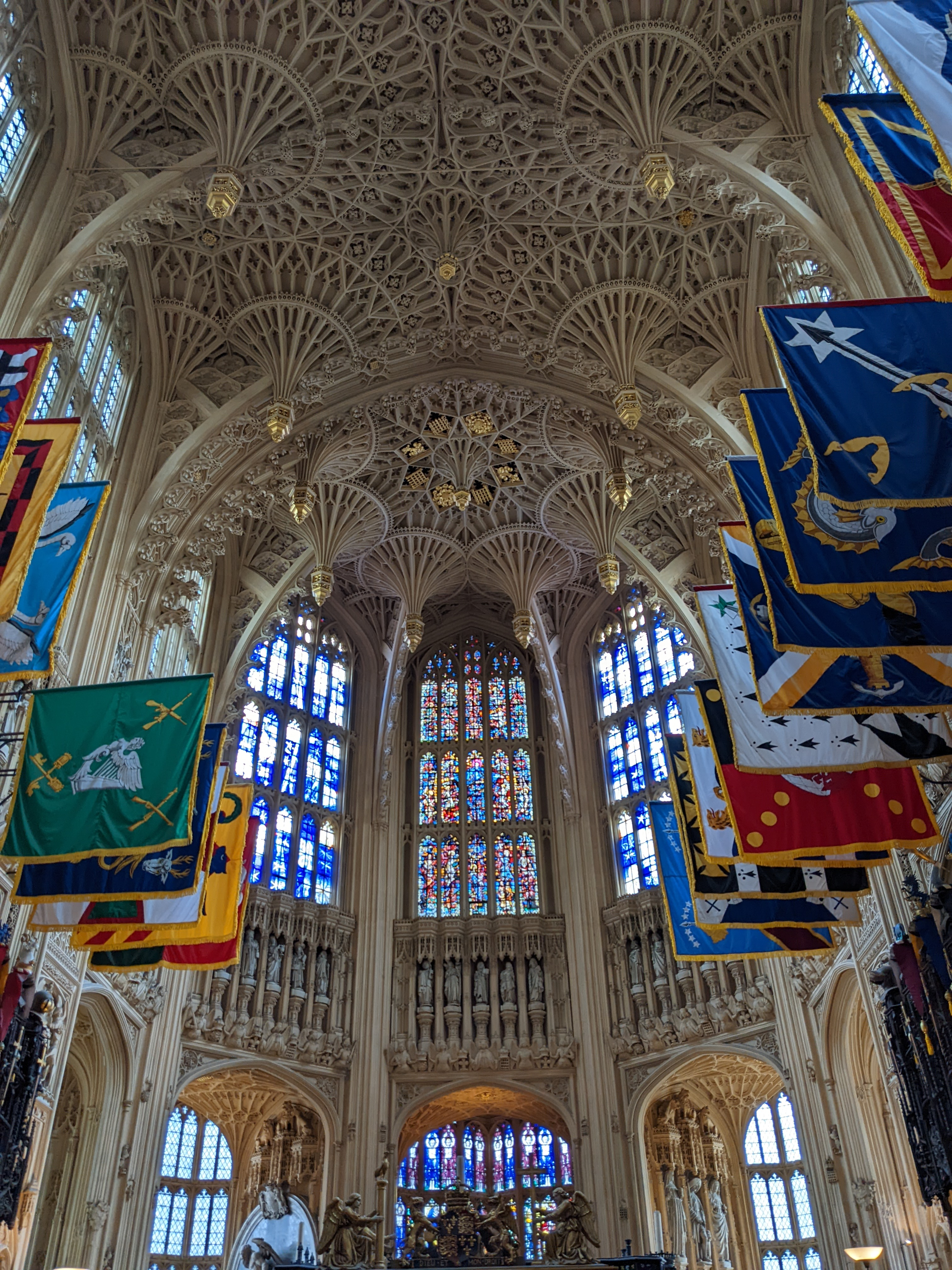
Henry VII Chapel (1516) featuring ornate pendant vaulting.

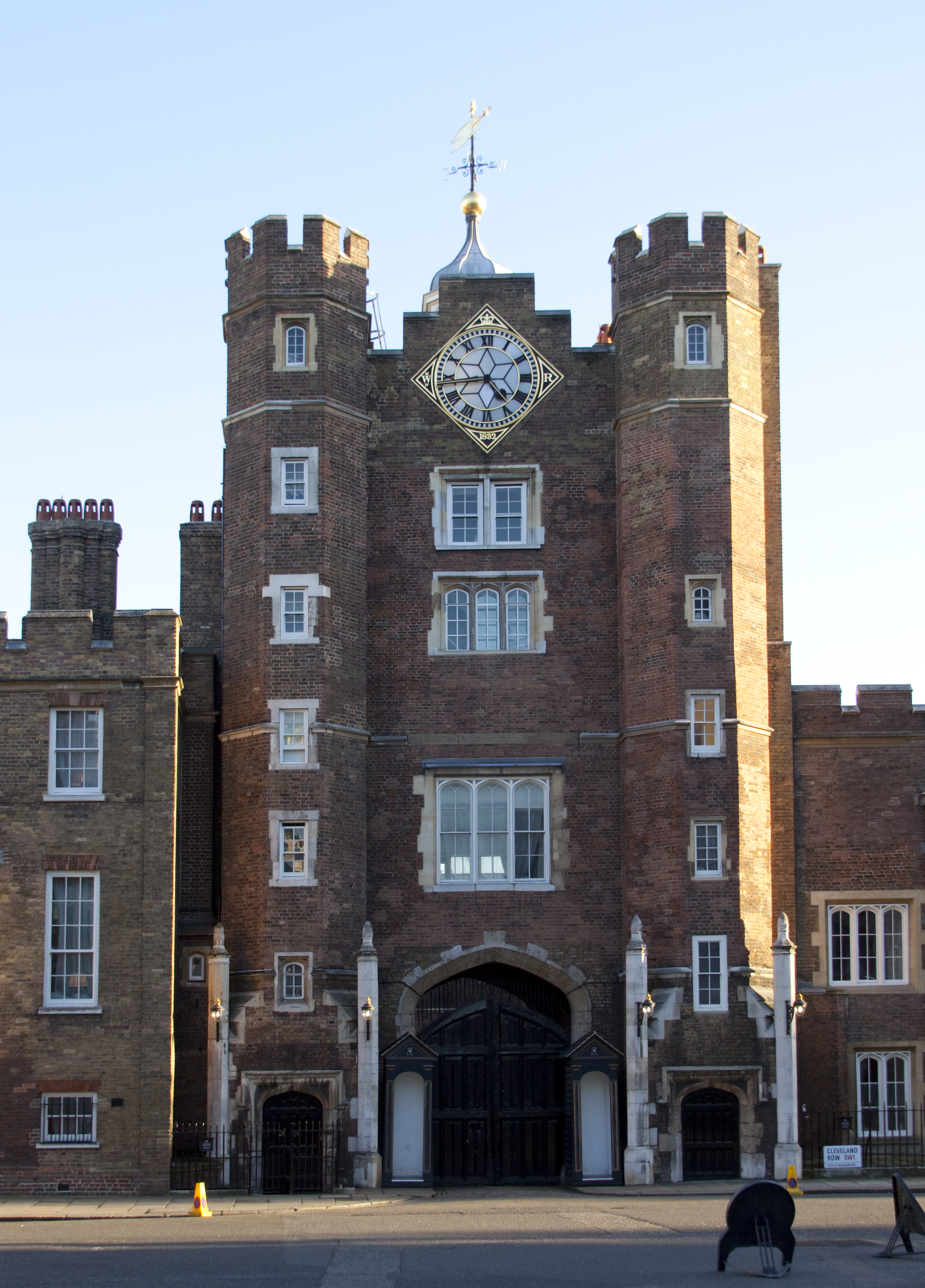
The Tudor gatehouse of St James's Palace (1536) built in red brick.

View of the central courtyard of Hampton Court Palace (1529-36): the most substantial surviving Tudor building in Greater London.

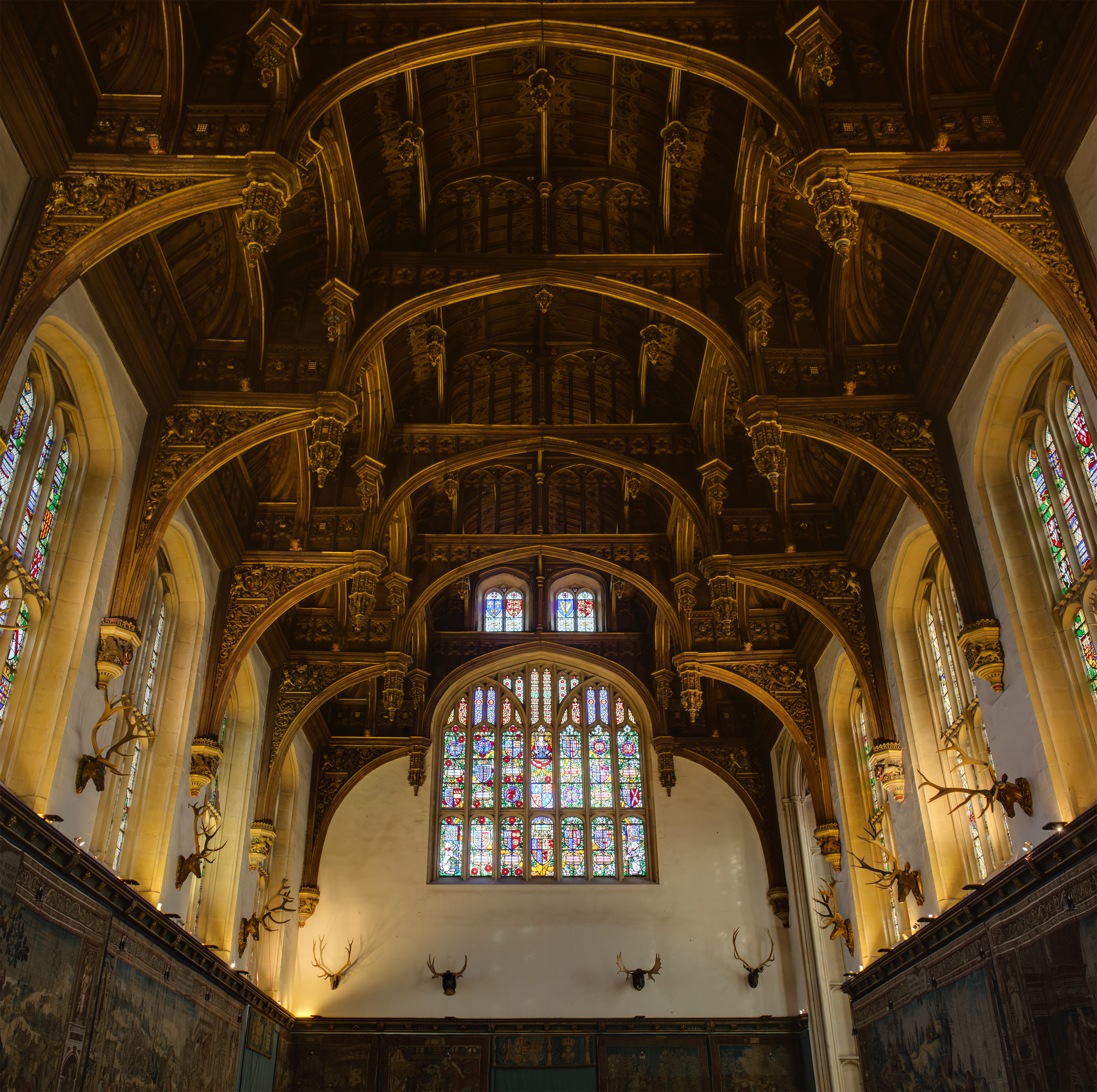
The great hall of Hampton Court Palace (1536) featuring a hammer beam roof.

The Tudor period was a period of significant expansion for London, both economically through increased overseas trade and in terms of population which grew from roughly 50,000 in 1500 to 250,000 in 1600. As a result, the city expanded considerably, and by the end of the 16th century, the majority of London's population lived outside the city walls for the first time. In the history of English architecture, the Tudor and Jacobean Periods are often categorized as part of the Middle Ages. This is because unlike in Southern Europe where Classicism had emerged as part of the Renaissance, in Tudor England medieval styles largely still persisted. This was particularly true of church architecture which was broadly still Gothic, a notable surviving example in London being the Henry VII Chapel completed in 1516, built in the Perpendicular style with a pendant vault ceiling. Concurrently, vernacular architecture and most domestic buildings continued to be timber framed in much the same style as those in the medieval period, with only the house of the wealthy and royalty being built of brick or of stone. Henry VII and Henry VIII commissioned a number of royal works within London, notably the extension and construction of several palaces including the Palace of Whitehall that stretched all the way from Westminster Hall to Charing Cross, the extravagant Nonsuch Palace in Greenwich and St James's Palace, which still partially survives today. By far the most substantial remaining Tudor palace in Greater London is Hampton Court Palace, originally built for Cardinal Wolsey and then later becoming a residence of Henry VIII. Although greatly extended by Christopher Wren in the late 17th century, the palace still retains most of its original Tudor architecture and is often regarded as one of the finest examples of the style in England. A significant development of Tudor architecture that can be observed at Hampton Court was the increased use of red brick, which became more readily available due to technical innovations in the late-15th century in continental Europe. Other early examples of this in London can be seen in the form of Bruce Castle, which is believed to be one of the oldest brick houses in England, as well the gatehouses of Lambeth Palace (1495) and St James's Palace (1536). Perhaps the most substantial way in which the Tudors influenced the future of character London in a manner which can still be observed today, was the establishments of the hunting grounds of Hyde Park, Green Park and St James's Park. These were later converted into public parks and are the main reason that Central London still has a notably high proportion of green space.

Notable timber framed buildings that survived The Great Fire of 1666

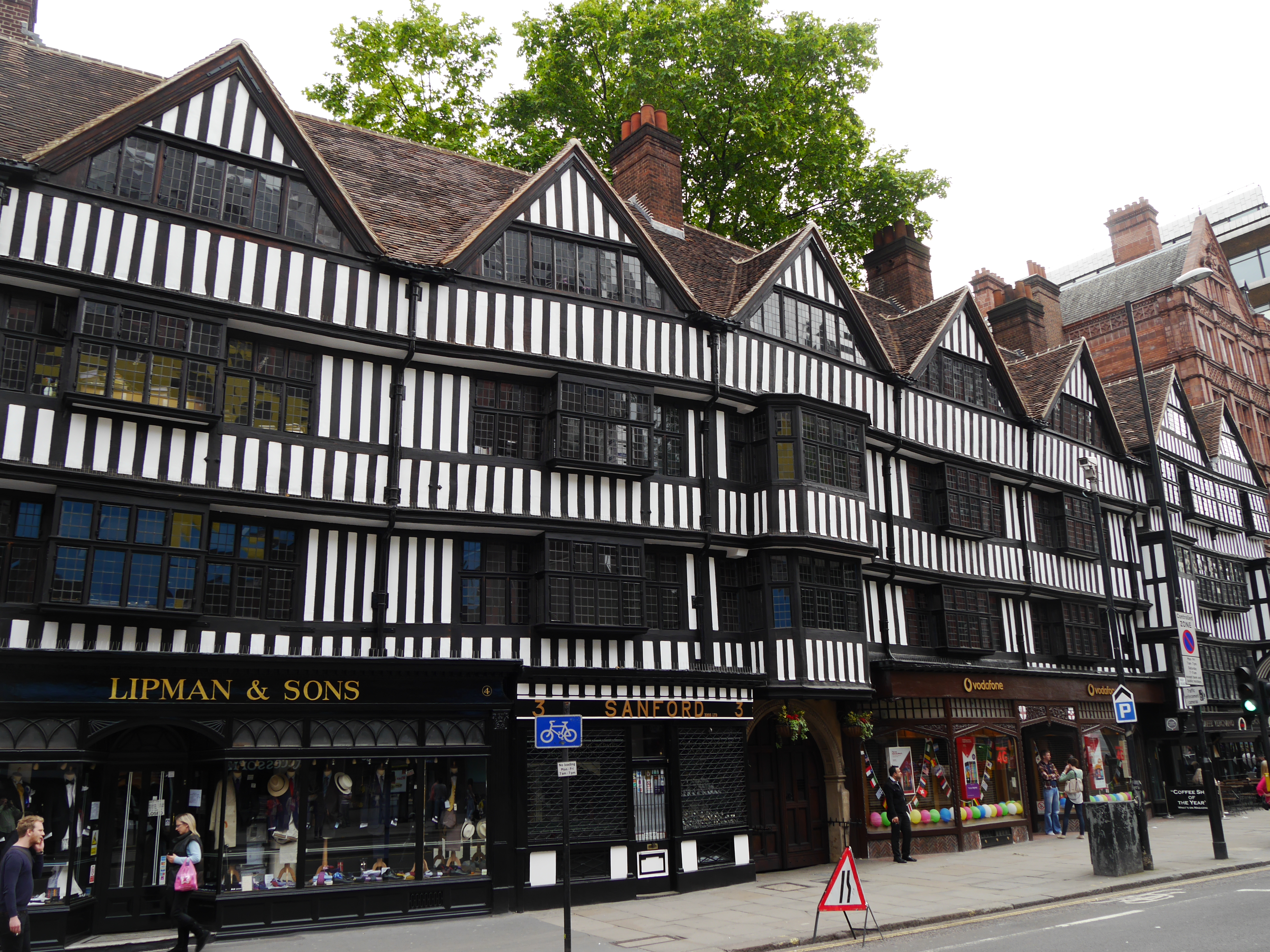
Staple Inn (1585) London's last surviving Inn of Chancery.

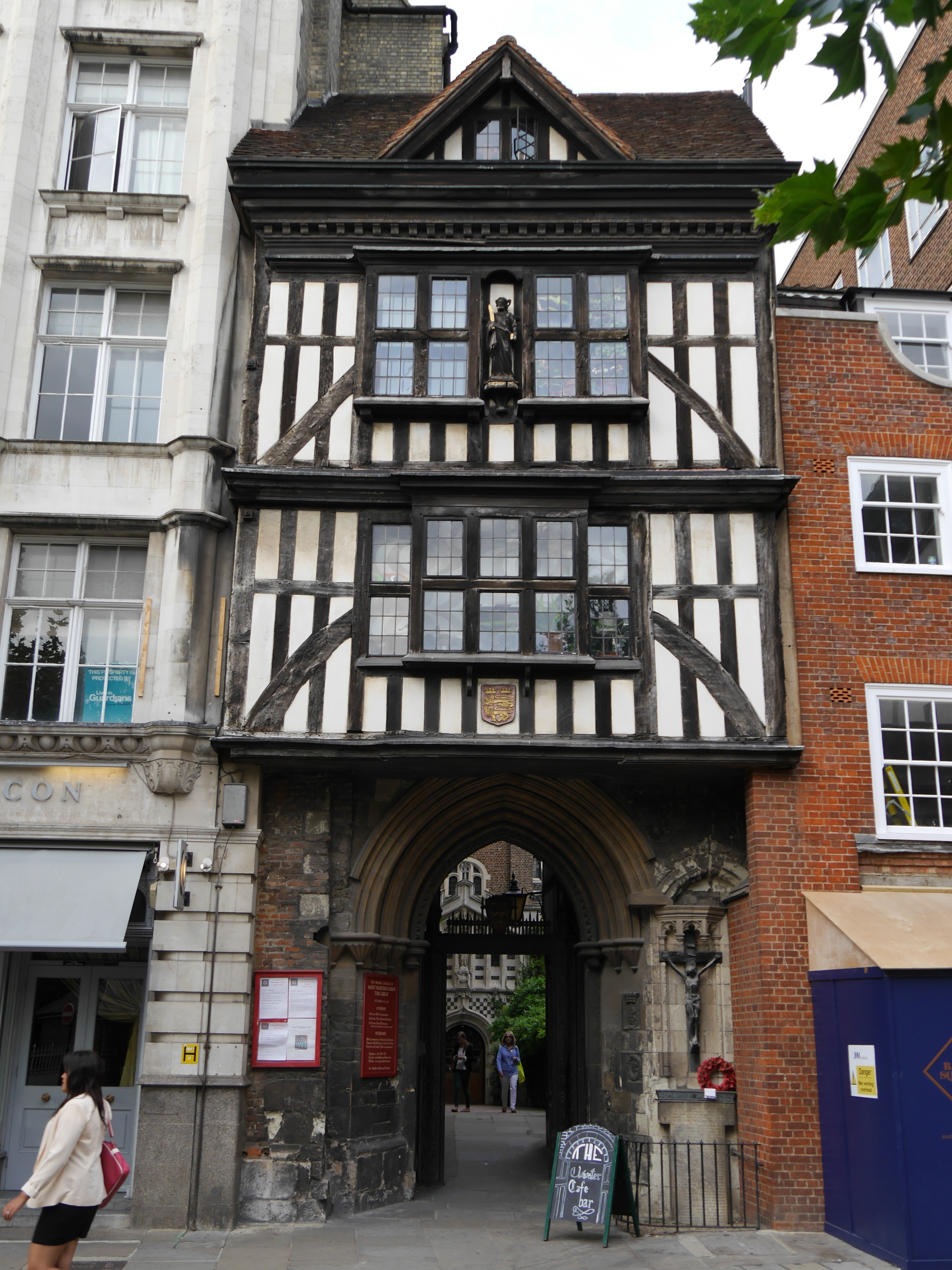
Saint Bartholomew's Gatehouse (1595)

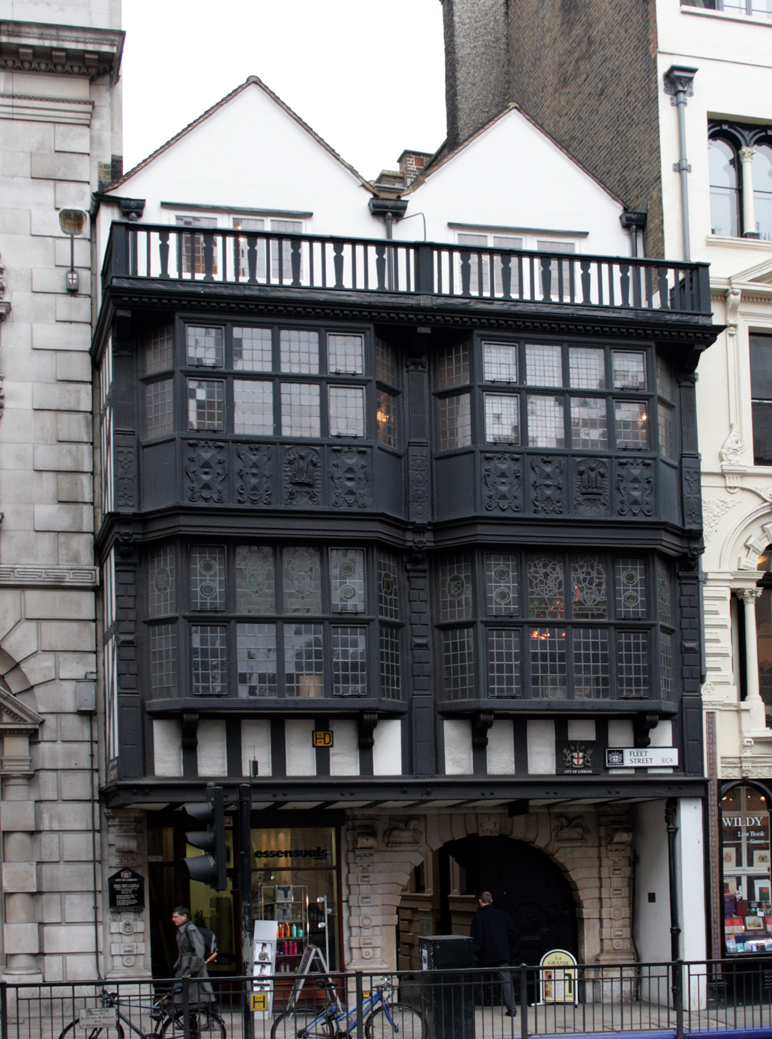
Prince Henry's Room (1610)

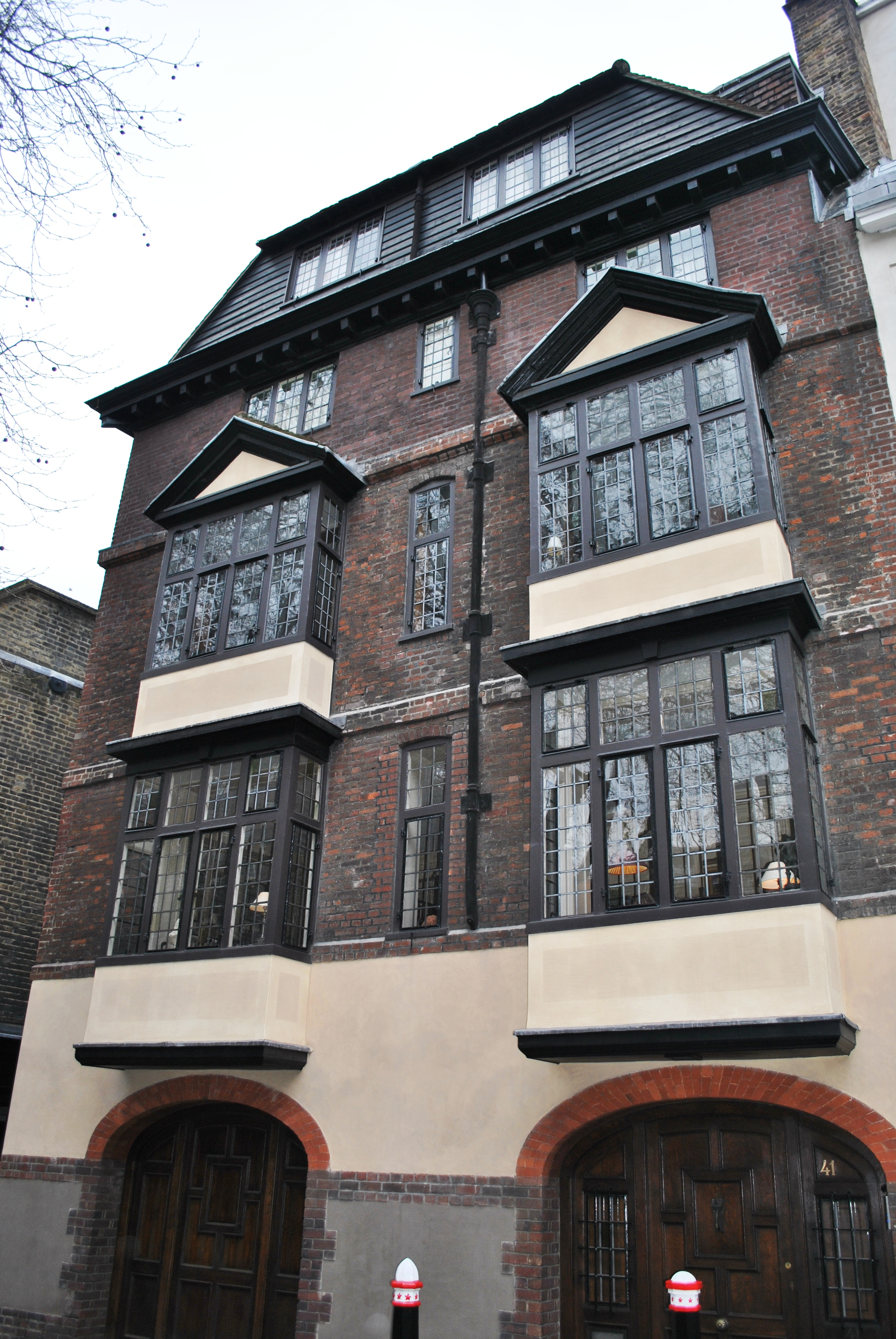
41 Cloth Fair (1614)

Despite the Tudors building in brick and stone for buildings types such as royal palaces, churches and stately houses for the aristocracy, the majority of residential and commercial buildings in London built in this period were essentially medieval in format; a timber frame with wattle and daub. Surviving Tudor buildings of this kind are usually painted black and white, but this is an anachronistic representation invented in the 19th-century; during the 16th-century such buildings were in fact usually painted in a plain whitewash colour . Most commercial and residential buildings in London before the Great Fire of 1666 assumed this form, but only a small handful of such buildings survive today. Some notable examples are Staple Inn, an Inn of Chancery from the late 16th-century, central London's oldest house 41 Cloth Fair dating from 1597 and Prince Henry's Room: a timber-framed jettied townhouse built in 1610. Another relic of this kind of architecture is the front façade of Sir Paul Pindar's house preserved in the Victoria and Albert Museum: an early 17th century merchant house on Bishopsgate, which was knocked down in 1890. Although the vast majority of such structures were destroyed in The Great Fire of London, many more did in fact survive until as late as the late 19th and early 20th centuries but were demolished to make way for new development, a notable example being Wych Street.

== Early Stuart London: Inigo Jones and the rise of Classicism (1603–1666) ==
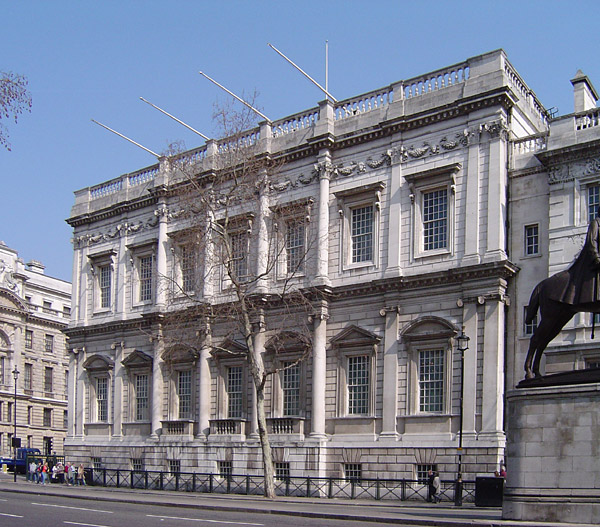
Banqueting house (1622) by Inigo Jones, one of London's first true classical buildings

Although late Tudor and in particular Elizabethan architecture utilised elements of classical architecture, these features were rarely applied in a coherent manner and were usually merely used as decorative features. However, in the early 17th century the a small number of buildings that could be stylistically classified as Classical appeared for the first time in London. This late arrival of the classical style to England was largely a product of the cultural division between northern and southern Europe that resulted from the Reformation. However, in the 17th century, upper-class Englishmen started to travel around Europe, particularly Italy, with the intention of absorbing the cultural influence of classical antiquity and the Renaissance, a phenomenon which became known as the Grand Tour.

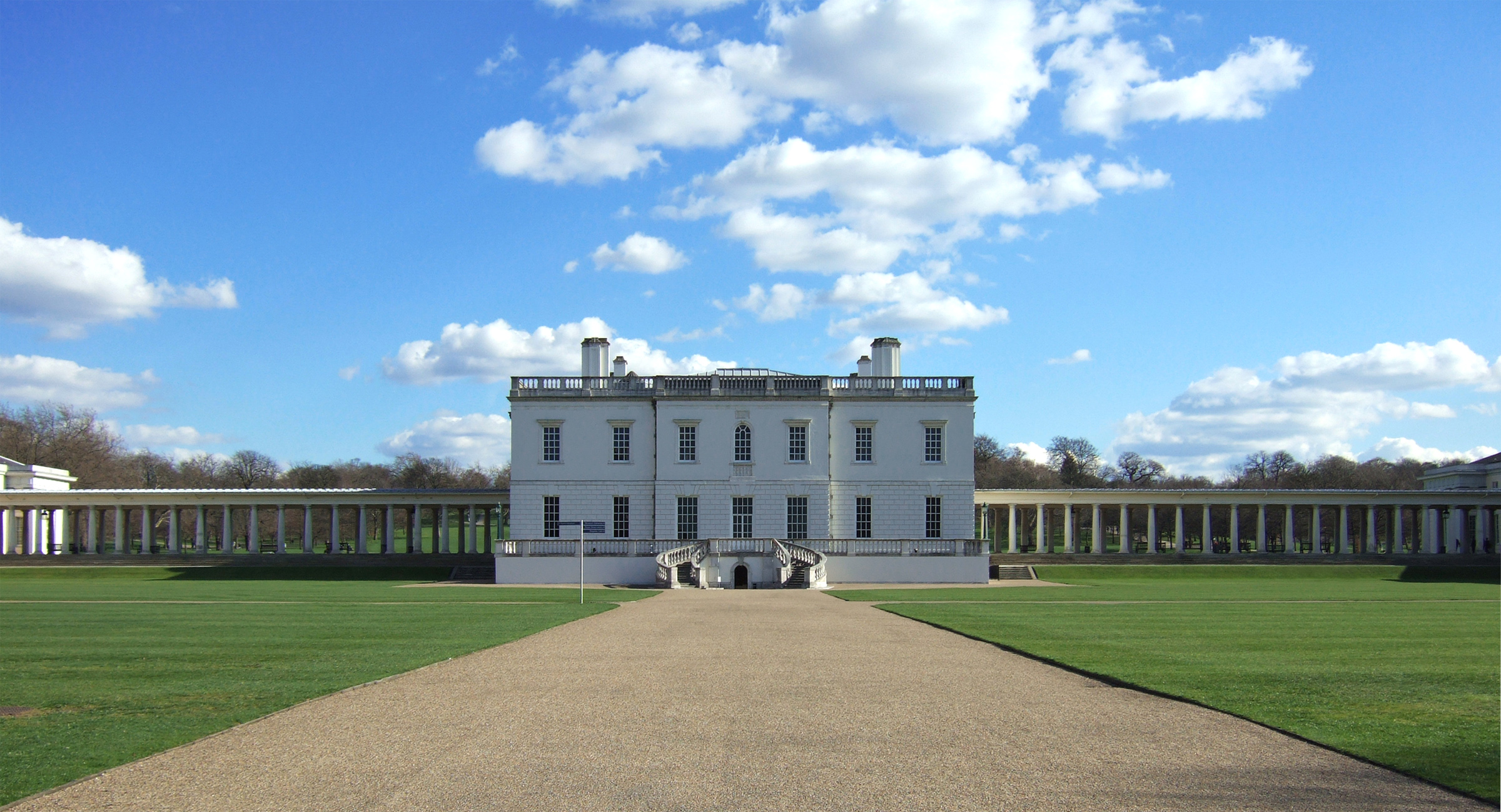
Queens House, Greenwich (1635) a Palladia residence built for Queen Anne of Denmark

One of the first Englishmen to participate in this activity was to become the pre-eminent architect of this milestone in the history of English architecture: Inigo Jones. Jones was appointed Surveyor of the King's Works in 1615, and having travelled around Italy and owning a copy of I quattro libri dell'architettura by Andrea Palladio, was one of the first English architects to be influenced primarily by classical architecture, both of classical antiquity and the revival of the style epitomised by Palladio. His first completed major work in inner London was Banqueting House, Whitehall (1622), an extension to the mostly medieval Palace of Whitehall, with a Palladian Portland stone façade and a fine painted ceiling by the Flemish painter Peter Paul Rubens. As the first truly classical building in London – a then predominantly medieval city in an architectural sense – it is a very significant building in the history of London's Architecture, described by Eric de Mare as:

"an architectural innovation that must have startled Londoners with its sophisticated Palladian Masonry, for its main façades containing rhythmical rows of tall windows, carved decorations and classical pilasters, all in mathematically, carefully proportioned precision, must have seemed to them like a stage set than a building."

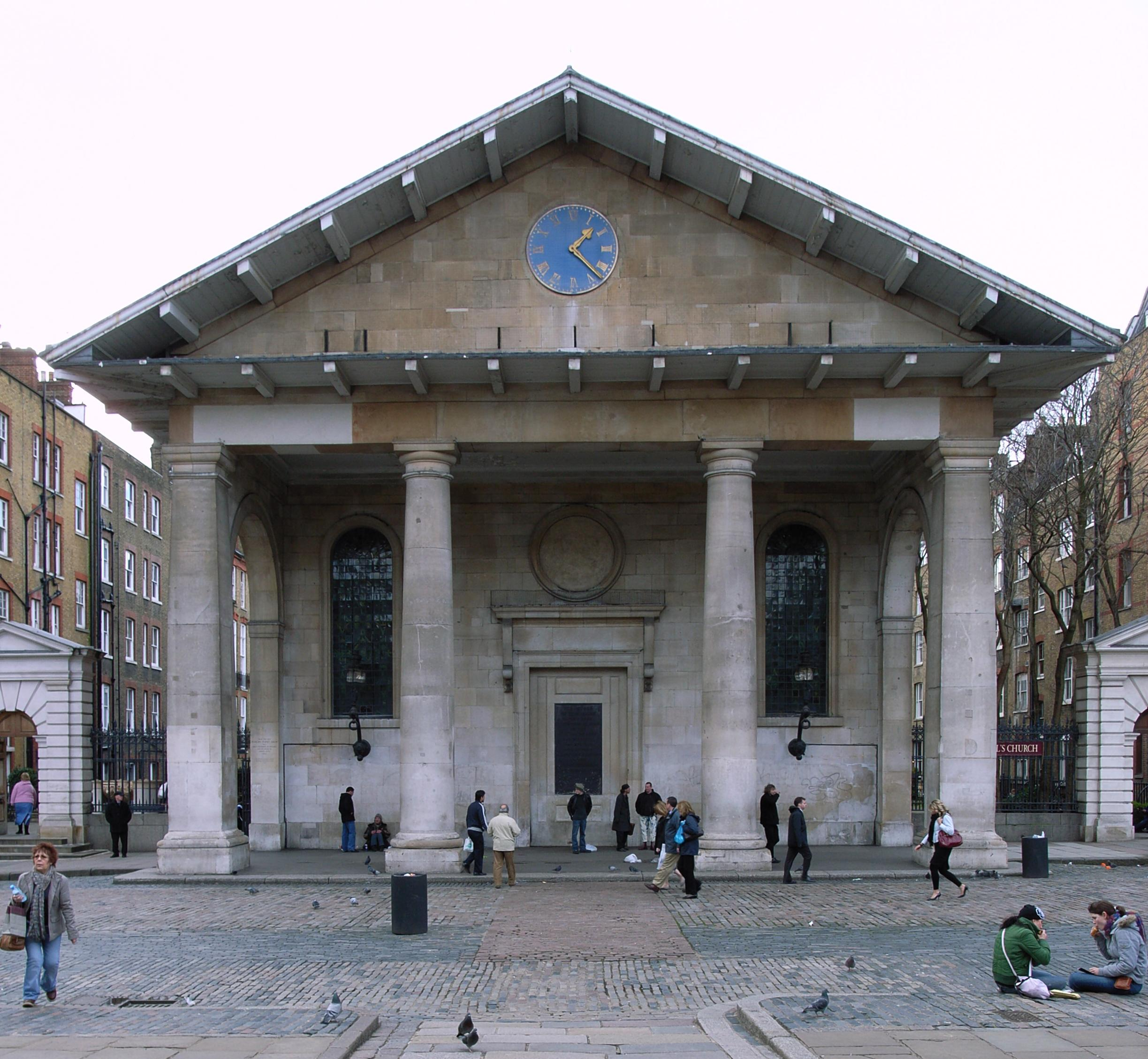
St Paul's, Covent Garden (1633) by Inigo Jones, the first Classical church in London

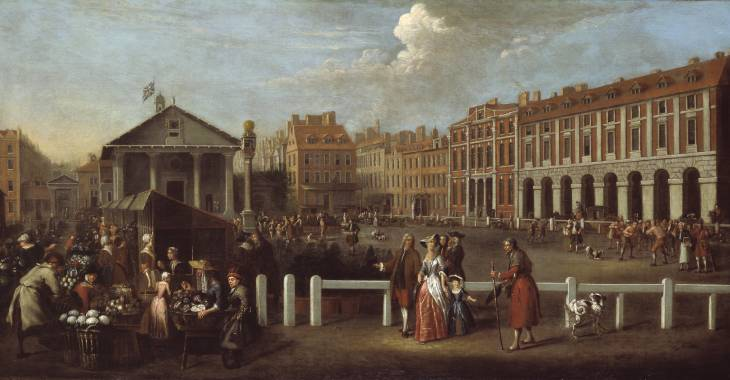
A painting of the Covent Garden piazza in 1737, showing Inigo Jones's colonnaded houses on the right. This was a highly influential piece of urban planning.

Another royal commission Queen's House, Greenwich was completed in 1635, despite being started three years before Banqueting House. It again shows Jones's purist Palladian style that did not mirror the exuberant Baroque fashionable in much of mainland Europe at the time. Perhaps Jones' most significant architectural commission in London that greatly influenced the future urban planning of London was his redevelopment of Covent Garden. In 1630 Jones was commissioned by the Earl of Bedford to redevelop the area in the west of the city with fine houses to attract wealthy tenants. Between 1630 and 1633 Jones designed and constructed London's first modern square; a classical style piazza lined with colonnaded terraced houses and the Church of St Paul on the western side: the first church in London built in a classical style, with a monumental Tuscan portico. The piazza became a blueprint for the fashionable squares built across the West End of London in the Georgian era and the Church of St Paul was an architectural blueprint for the baroque city churches built by Wren after The Great Fire of London.

The outbreak of the English Civil War in 1642 greatly interrupted building activity in England, and after the parliamentarian victory Jones was heavily fined due to his close connections to Charles I. He later died in poverty in 1652. His London works the Banqueting House, Queen's House, St Paul's Covent Garden and Queen's Chapel all survive to this day. Lindsey House (1640) on Lincolns Inn Fields, a very early Palladian townhouse, is possibly by Jones. Jones's apprentice John Webb was commissioned to build a palace at Greenwich for Charles II in 1661 after the Stuart Restoration. One wing of this palace was built before funds ran out in 1664. It is very much in a style reminiscent of Inigo Jones and was later incorporated into the Old Royal Naval College.

== Baroque London: The Great Fire of London and Christopher Wren's Reconstruction (1666–1714) ==
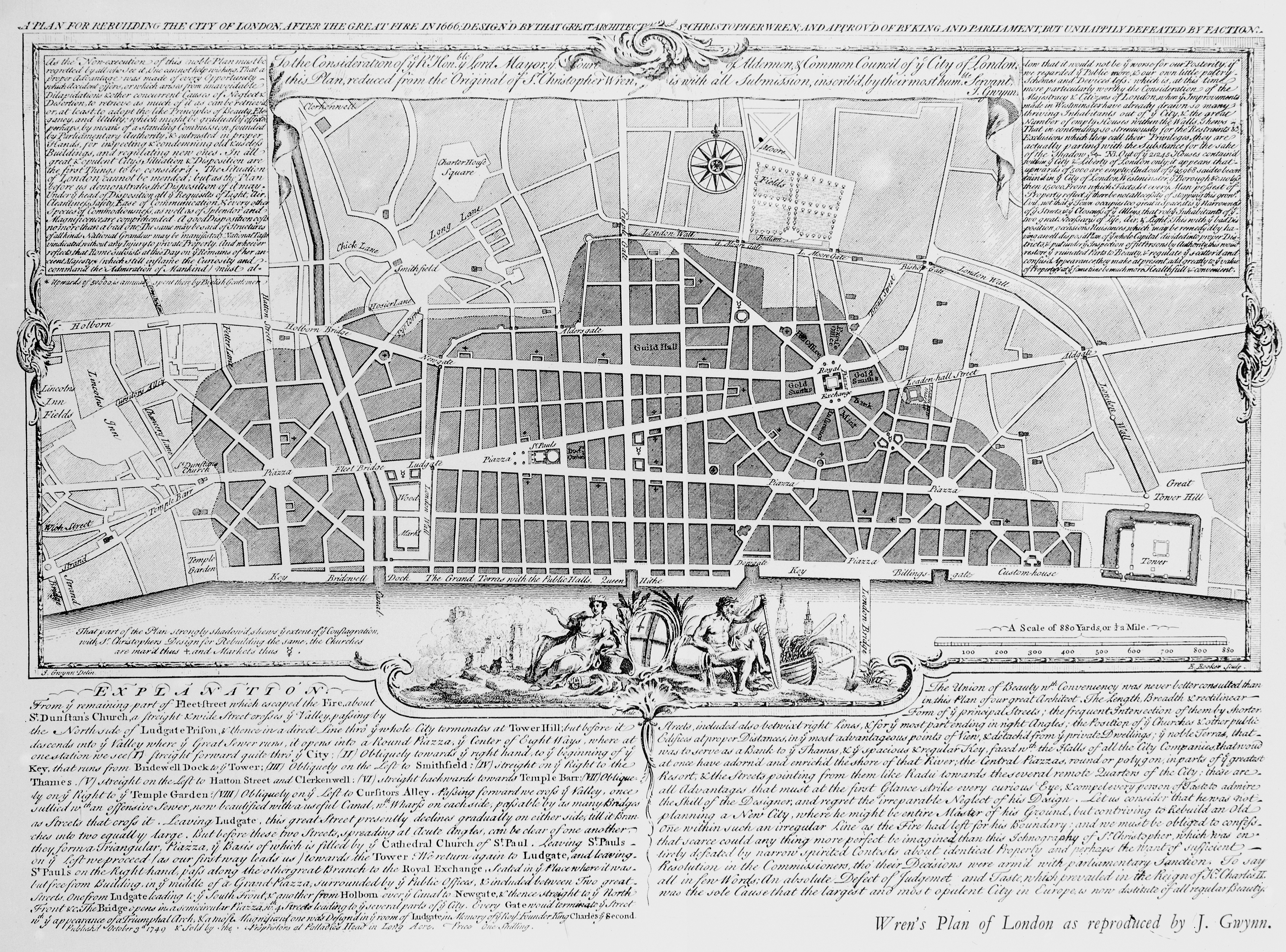
Christopher Wren's classical style plan for the reconstruction of London with an entirely new street plan, piazzas and wide boulevards

The Great Fire of London in 1666 is one of the most significant turning points in the history of London's architecture. Paradoxically, despite being perceived as a cataclysmic event at the time, the enormous destruction it caused presented a historic opportunity to modernise a city that was architecturally primitive and medieval in character compared to many other European capitals of the era. Starting at a bakery on Pudding Lane on Sunday September 2, 1666, the fire destroyed around 90% of the city, including a total of 13,500 houses, 87 parish churches, 44 Company Halls, the Royal Exchange, the Custom House, Old St Paul's Cathedral, the Bridewell Palace and other city prisons, the General Letter Office, and three city gates; Ludgate, Newgate, and Aldersgate. Due to the majority of the population being made homeless, as well as the destruction of the majority of London's businesses and infrastructure, there was a strong emphasis on the reconstruction being as a rapid as possible, which made the planning of the new city more pragmatic than aesthetic in focus.

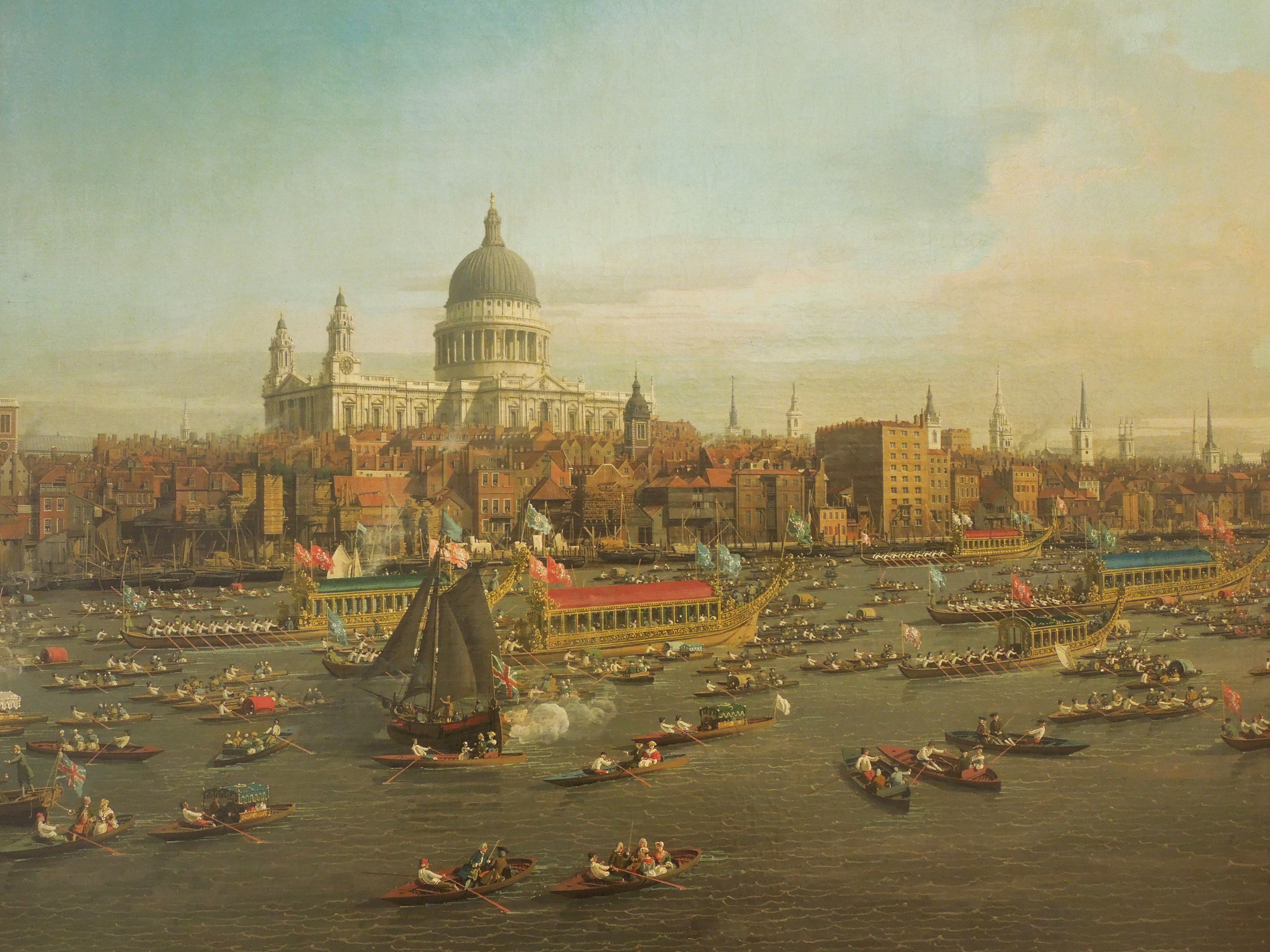
St Paul's Cathedral and the city churches by Canaletto (1747) illustrating the picturesque skyline that resulted from the restrictions placed on the height of non-church buildings

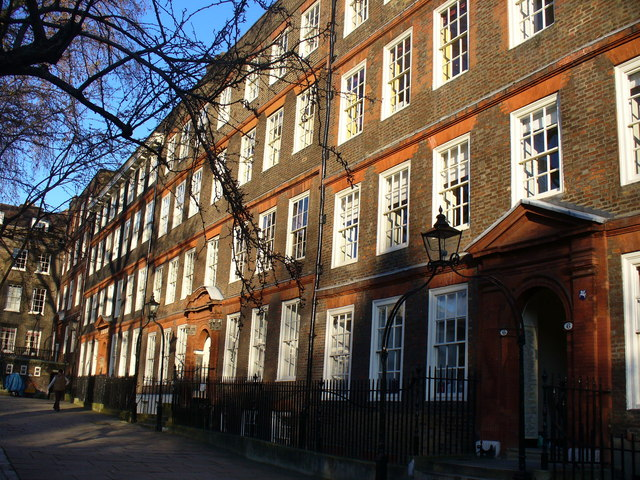
Early brick terraces at King's Bench Walk, dating from just after the Great Fire

A radical new classical style reconstruction plan was drawn up by Christopher Wren which proposed to completely discard the city's ancient street plan in favour of a rationalised grid system with wide boulevards, piazzas and a uniform classical style for all new buildings. A new St. Paul's Cathedral and Royal Exchange would be the focus points of the new city plan complete with their own piazzas. The plan aimed to beautify the city, assist commerce, increase ease of transport within the city by road, modernise shipping infrastructure on the river front and most importantly make the city fireproof. However, due to a shortage of labour necessary to complete such grandiose plans, complications with redistributing and compensating property that had been lost in the fire, and the intense urgency of rebuilding the city, it was decided to rebuild the city around the original medieval street plan. London nonetheless witnessed a radical transformation in its reconstruction; with perhaps the most striking characteristic of the new city being its uniformity. This was largely a result of new building regulations introduced by an act of parliament called The Act for the Rebuilding of the City of London in 1667. This act stated that all new houses were to be built to a uniform height and plot size, as well all being built of brick rather than wood to reduce fire hazard. The majority of new houses and small commercial buildings assumed the form of neatly proportioned brick terraces, while more prominent buildings were usually built of Portland stone. Additionally, the stylistic uniformity of the new architecture was largely due to the dominance of Christopher Wren in the planning of the new city due to being appointed Surveyor of the King's Works in 1669, which also meant he was the chief designer of the most significant new public and ecclesiastical buildings in the city. This cemented his status as the dominant architect in England for the remainder of the 17th century and the English Baroque movement.

=== St Paul's Cathedral ===
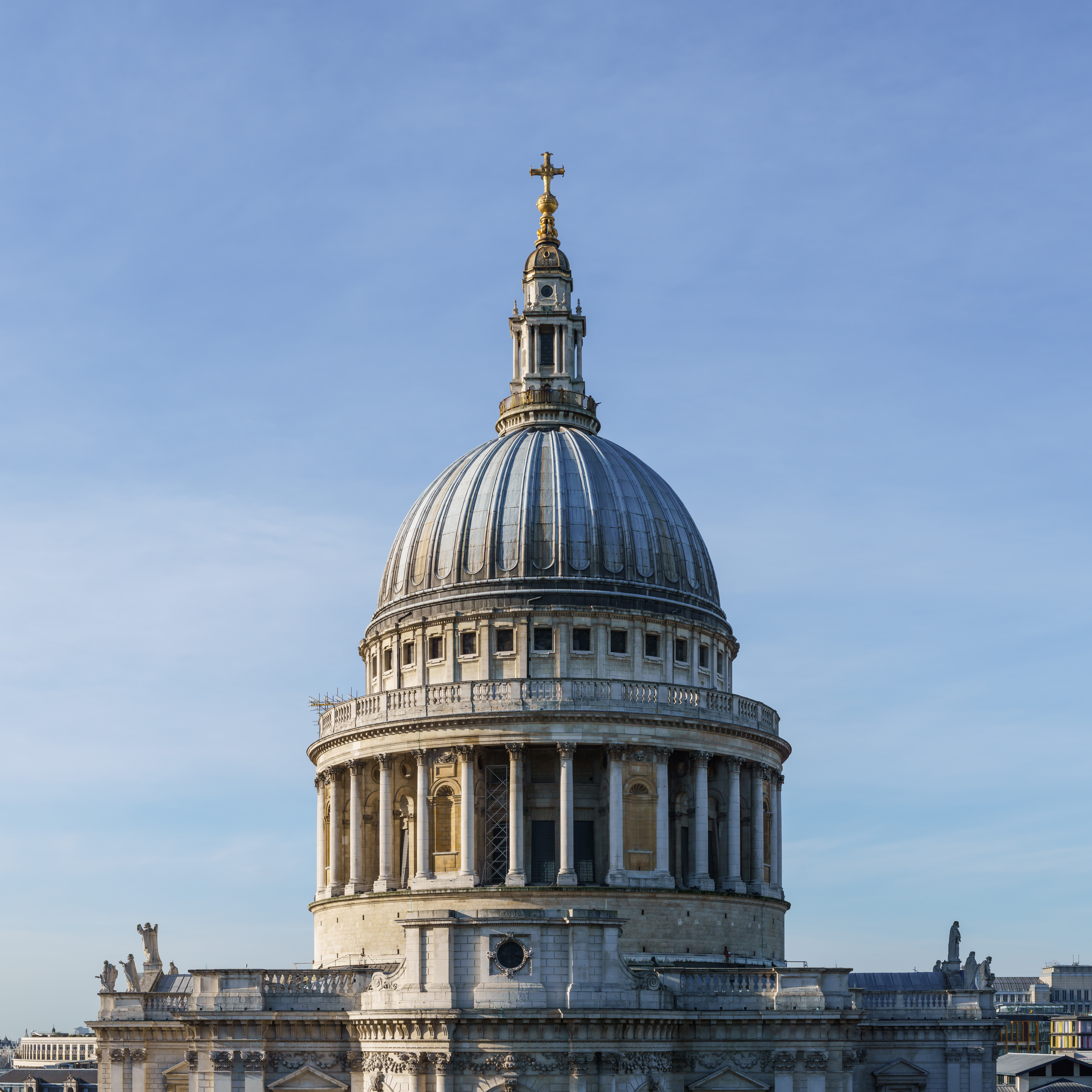
The 111 m (365 ft) dome of St. Paul's Cathedral (1710) the tallest building in London until 1963.

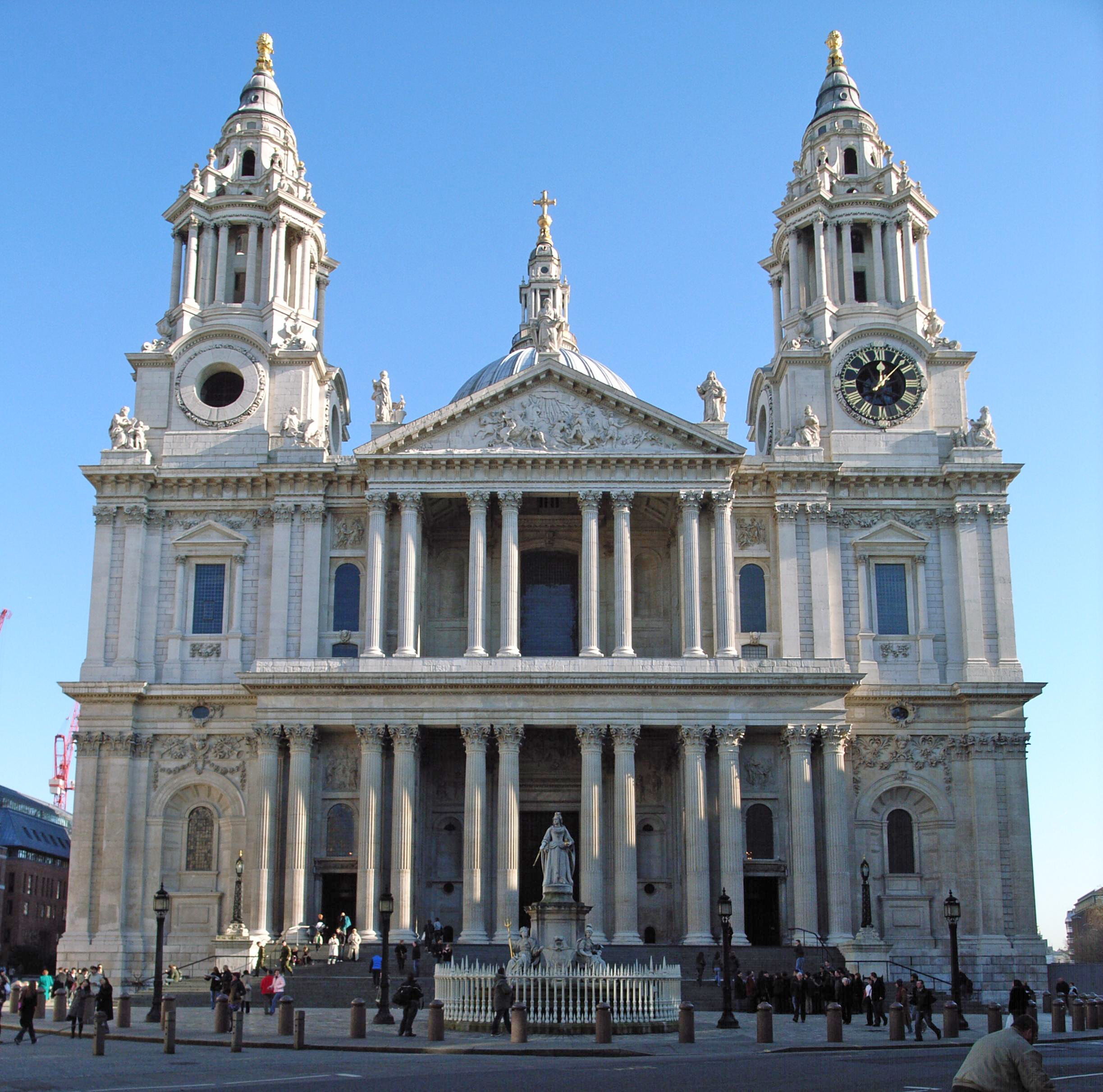
The west front, consisting of a double Corinthian order which is arguably more neoclassical than baroque

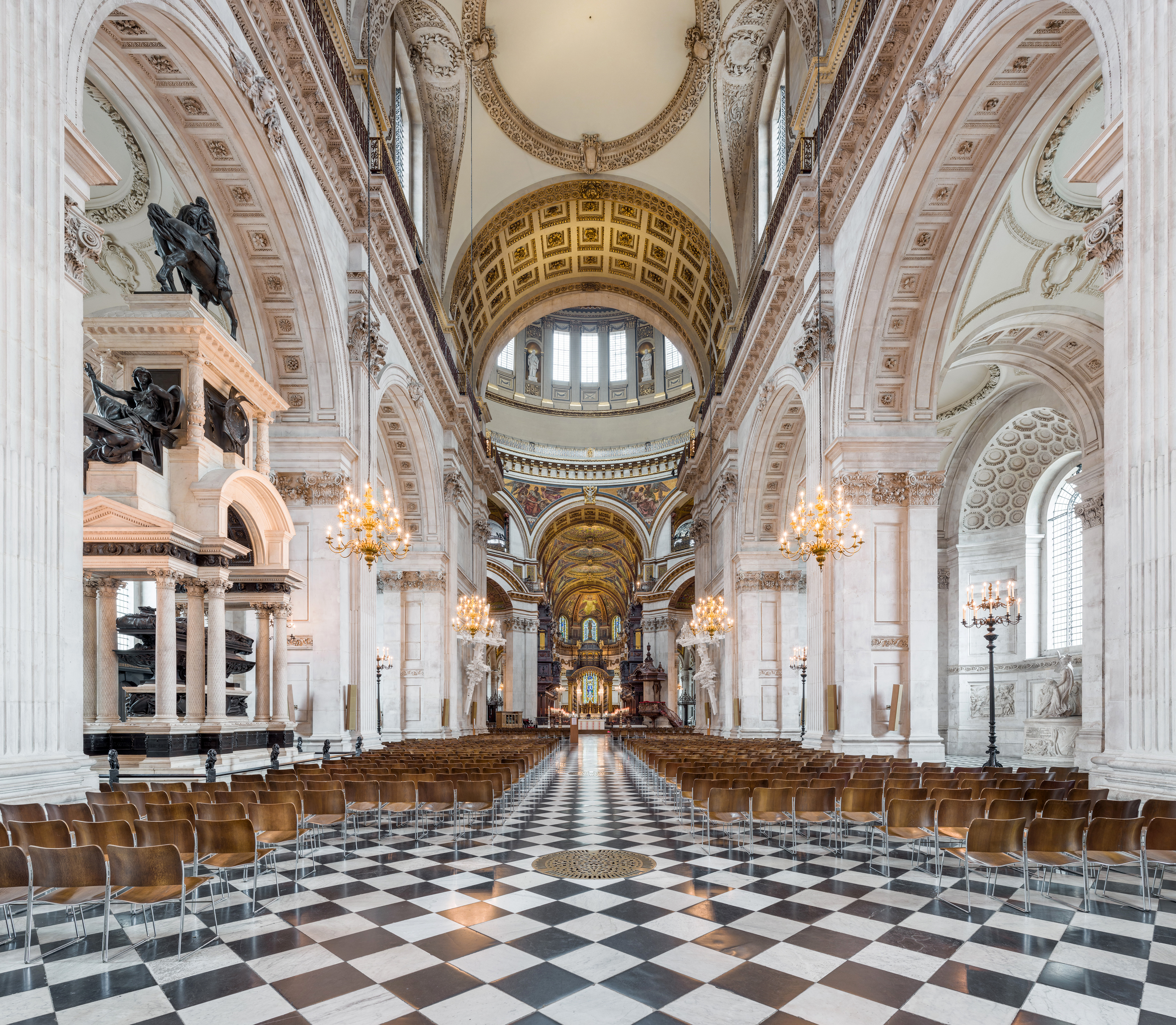
The nave, retaining some of the plain white surfaces that reflect the original character of the interior.

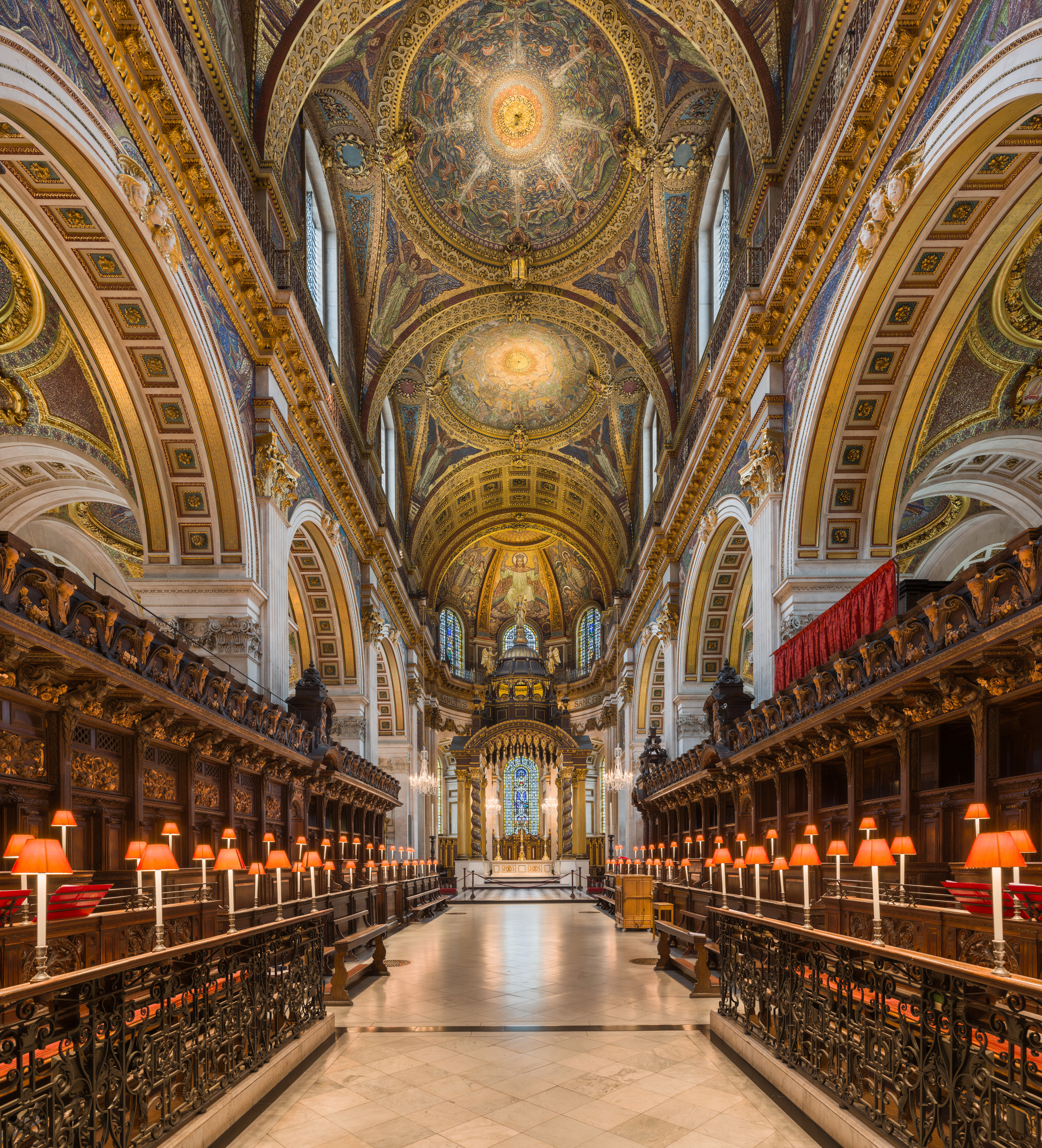
The high altar, with elaborate mosaics were added in the 19th-century.

The most striking architectural achievement of the new city was the reconstruction of St Paul's Cathedral and the city churches by Christopher Wren and his design team, which included other notable architects like Nicholas Hawksmoor and John Vanbrugh. Much like his masterplan for the reconstruction of the city, Wren's original design for the new St Paul's Cathedral was rejected and a compromise design had to be reached. Inspired by St. Peter's Basilica in Rome, Wren originally wanted to build a domed baroque style cathedral built in a Greek cross layout, but this design was rejected by the church as a result of the papist connotations of the Southern European design. In an act of compromise, the design that was eventually built is a hybrid design which utilises baroque ornamentation and a great dome but built on the Latin cross layout of the former gothic cathedral.

This use of a Gothic layout means that in many ways St. Paul's is very distinct from its European equivalents, having a far longer nave and by extension a far less centralised, symmetrical plan than most European Baroque churches. This layout also necessitated the corporation of some structural features not typically associated with Baroque architecture such as the use of buttressing to support the nave; these are behind a screen wall to give the illusion of a homogenously Baroque structure. The design of the completed building also changed substantially over the course of the 30 year building, differing substantially from what was known as 'The Warrant Design' which was his original proposal. Construction began in 1675 and was finally completed in 1710, with much of the later work being overseen by Wren's son Christopher Wren the Younger.

The most notable element of Wren's new cathedral is the 111-metre-high dome completed in 1710, described by Nicholaus Pevsner as "one of the most perfect in the world". It has become one of London's most enduring landmarks and was London's tallest building from 1710 until 1963 with the completion of the Millbank Tower. One of the most illusory aspects of the dome, as well as an integral part of its structure is the great difference in height between the inner and outer dome. The dome viewed from the inside is not the interior of outer dome viewed from the exterior, with the two being connected by a brick cone which supports the stone lantern on top and the timbers which horizontally support the lead cladding on the dome's exterior. The dome alongside the main west façade on Ludgate Hill, which utilises a double Corinthian order similar to Claude Perrault's façade at the Louvre (1665), is arguably more akin to Neoclassicism than the typical Baroque style found in continental Europe. However, English Baroque often deviated from the stereotype elements of the style in other European countries and other features of the cathedral such as the double towers on the main west façade, as well as much of the ornate exterior decoration are undeniably Baroque in character. The interior was originally relatively plain with most of the internal surfaces being originally composed of bare Portland Stone and white plaster, while the inner dome was painted as it is today. The ornate mosaics concentrated around the high altar and quire were in fact added much later by William Blake Richmond between 1891 and 1904 in a Byzantine-influenced style.

=== The City Churches ===
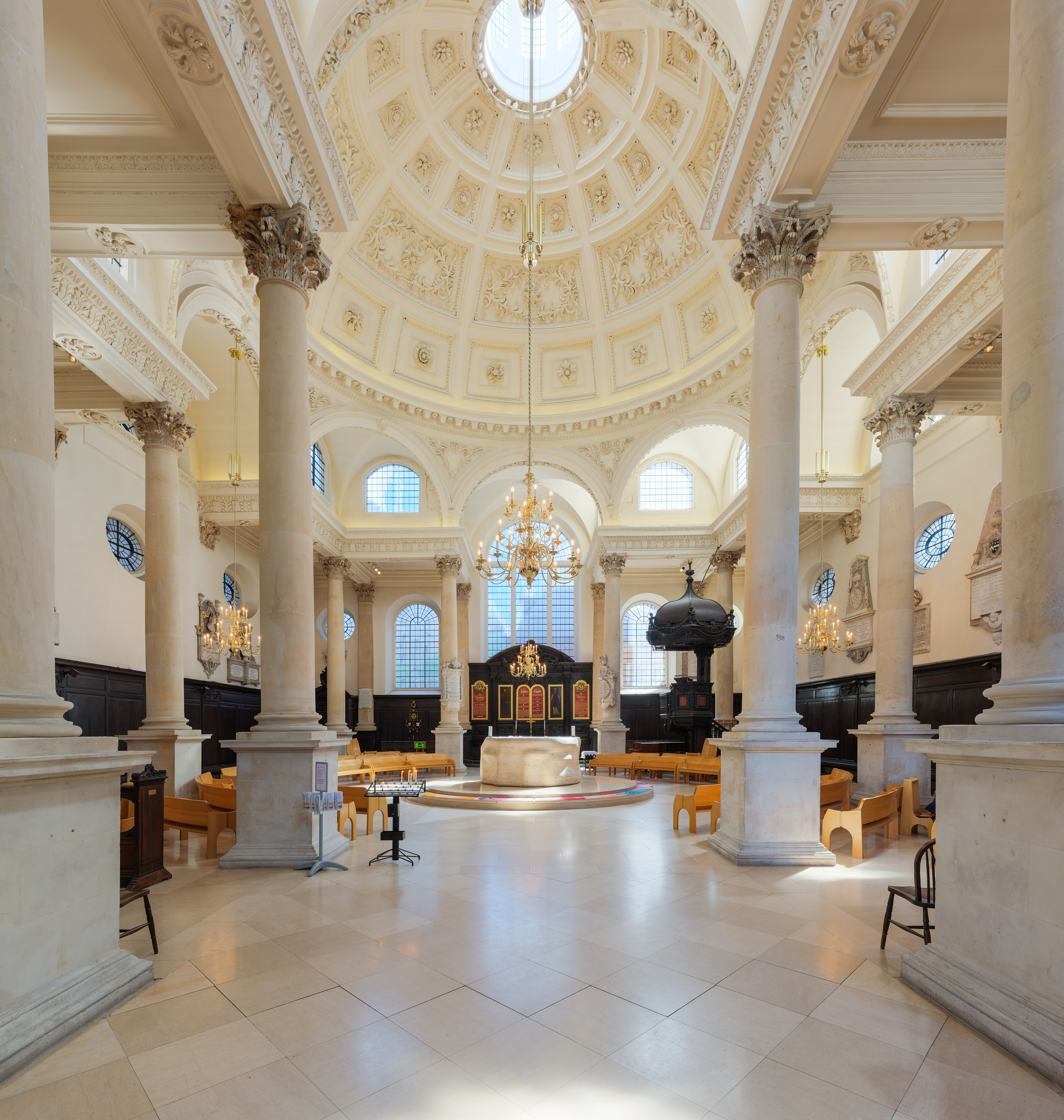
The domed interior of St. Stephen Walbrook (1679), arguably the most baroque of all the city churches

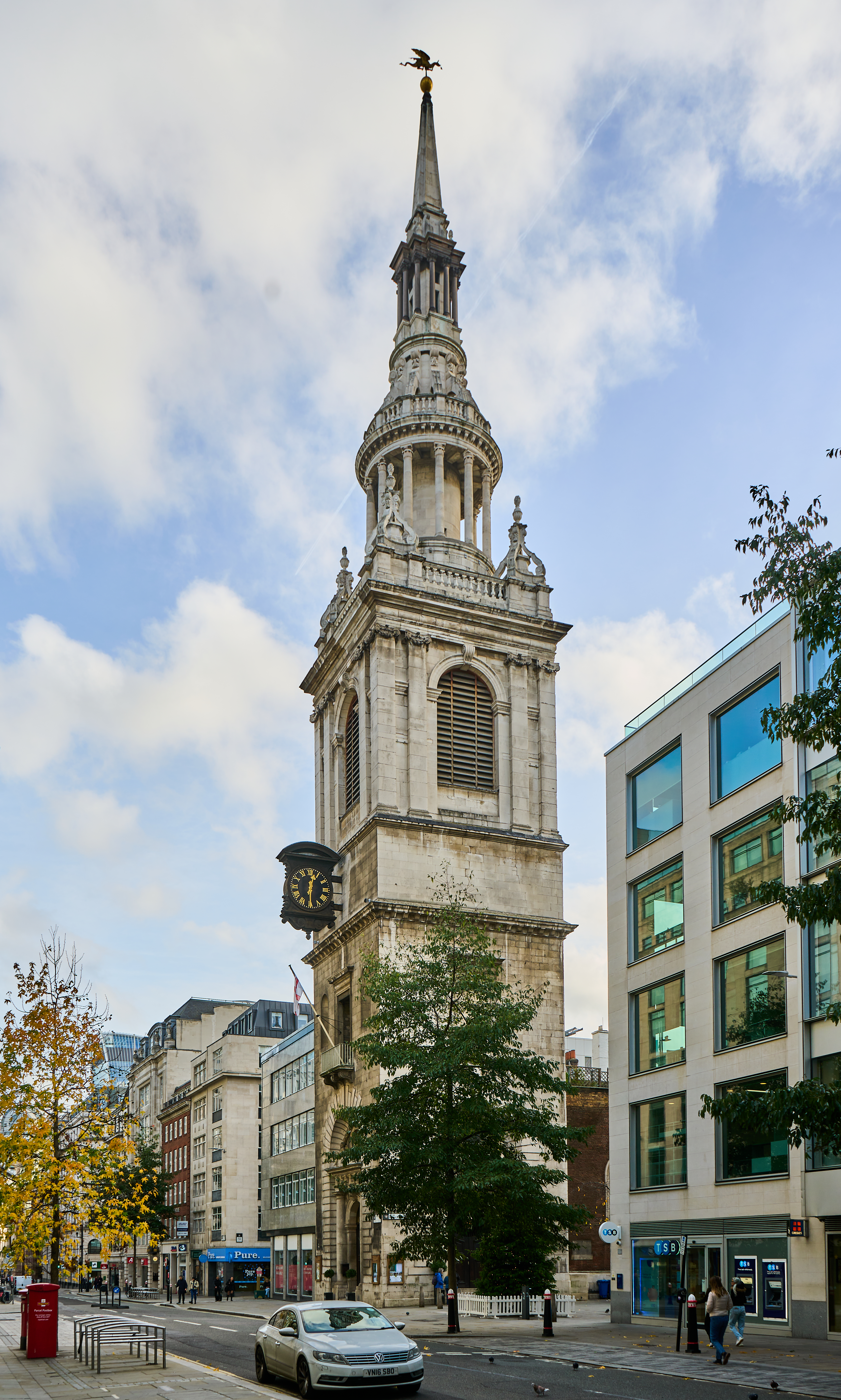
The famous St Mary-le-Bow (1680) a blend of classical and gothic influences.

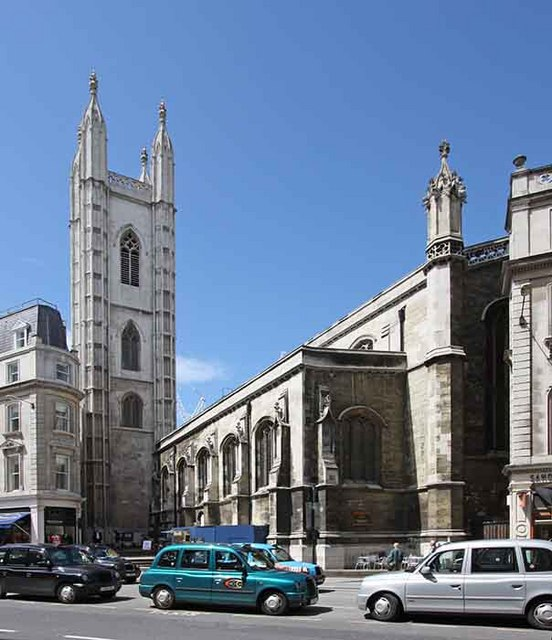
St. Mary Aldermary (1681), an example of one of the city churches built in a faithful Neo-Gothic style.

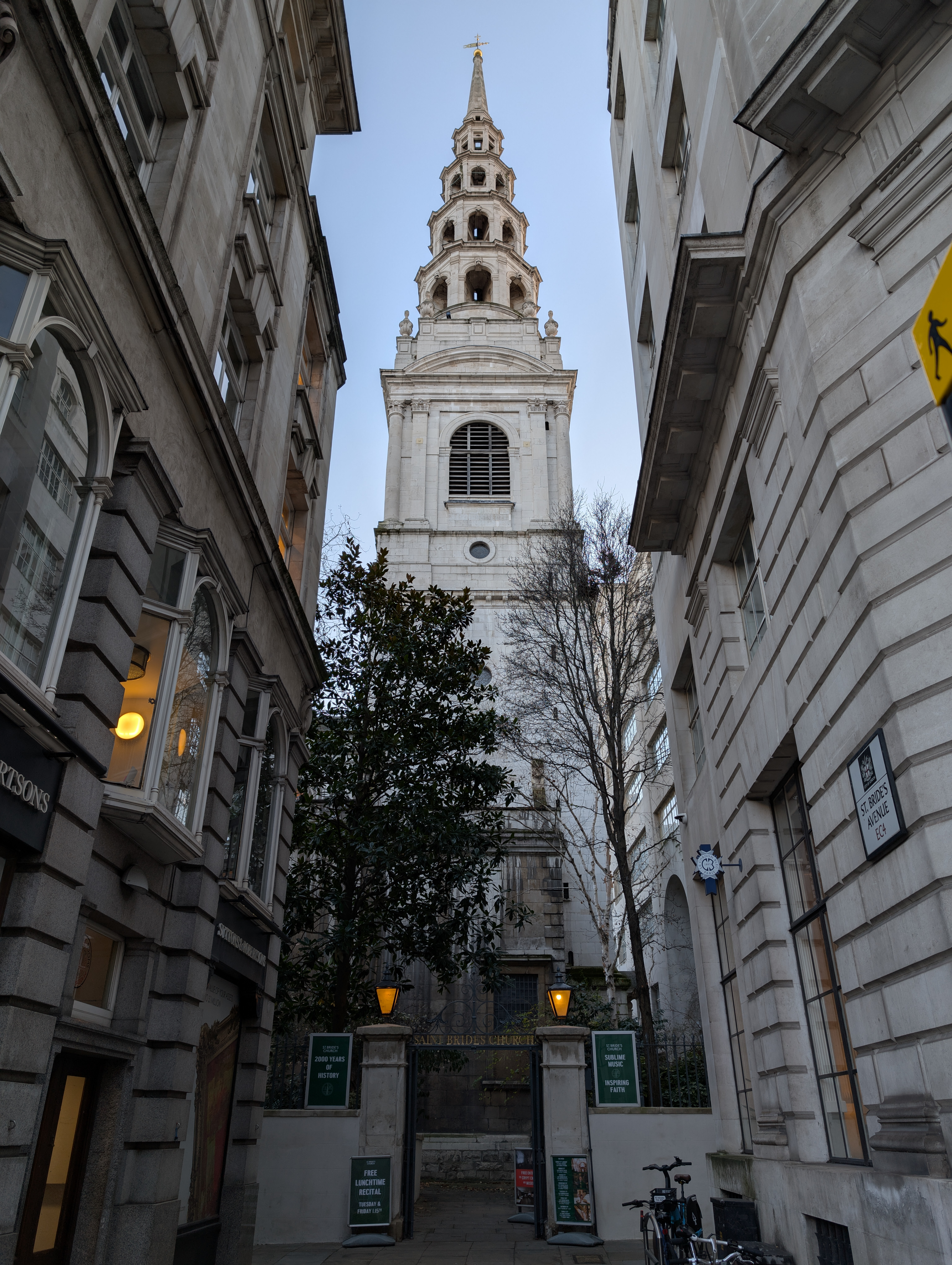
The distinctive tiered spire of St. Bride's, Fleet Street (1684), the tallest of the city churches at 69 m (226 ft).

The 51 city churches (25 of which survive, the remainder being lost to demolition or The Blitz) designed by Wren and his team are of great architectural significance. Stylistically they are eclectic and inventive designs, often built on small and limiting sites with the towers being the most architecturally inventive feature of their exteriors. Their variation in design and style is a result of the restraints relating to the location and context of each of these churches, but also because much of the design work was carried out by other architects in Wren's team, most notably Nicholas Hawksmoor and John Vanburgh, who were to become the other most prominent figures in the emerging English Baroque style and were arguably more exuberant in their style than Wren. Among the most famous of these new churches is St Bride's Fleet Street with its unique tiered spire and St Mary-le-Bow, which blends Baroque and Gothic influences.

Stylistically most of the churches are not purely baroque in style, with a notable exception being St Stephen's Walbrook which has a fine domed interior. Many of the churches such as St Peter Upon Cornhill showcase influence from Dutch Baroque and Palladianism, whereas others like St Mary Aldermary are purely neo-gothic recreations of the former medieval churches, complete with a fan vaulted ceiling recalling the perpendicular gothic of the late Middle Ages. The majority of these churches were built of white Portland stone but some were also built of red-brick. Perhaps the most significant achievement of Wren's reconstruction of St Paul's and the city churches was their overall interaction as an ensemble. Canaletto's 1750 views of the City of London show how St Paul's and the city churches soar above the city. The result was a picturesque skyline whose beauty astounded visitors. And so the Great Fire gave a new lease of life to the city. In the words of the architectural historian Dr Simon Thurley:

"This apparent catastrophe [...] was in reality one of the best things that ever happened to London. [...] The Great Fire of London of London enabled a new start - mass housing, handsome paved streets with modern churches and public buildings. There was a new Royal Exchange, a new Cathedral, a rebuilt Guildhall. London now was cleaner, more modern and more uniform than any other city in Europe [...] and it remained so until the mid 19th century."

=== Late Baroque Architecture ===
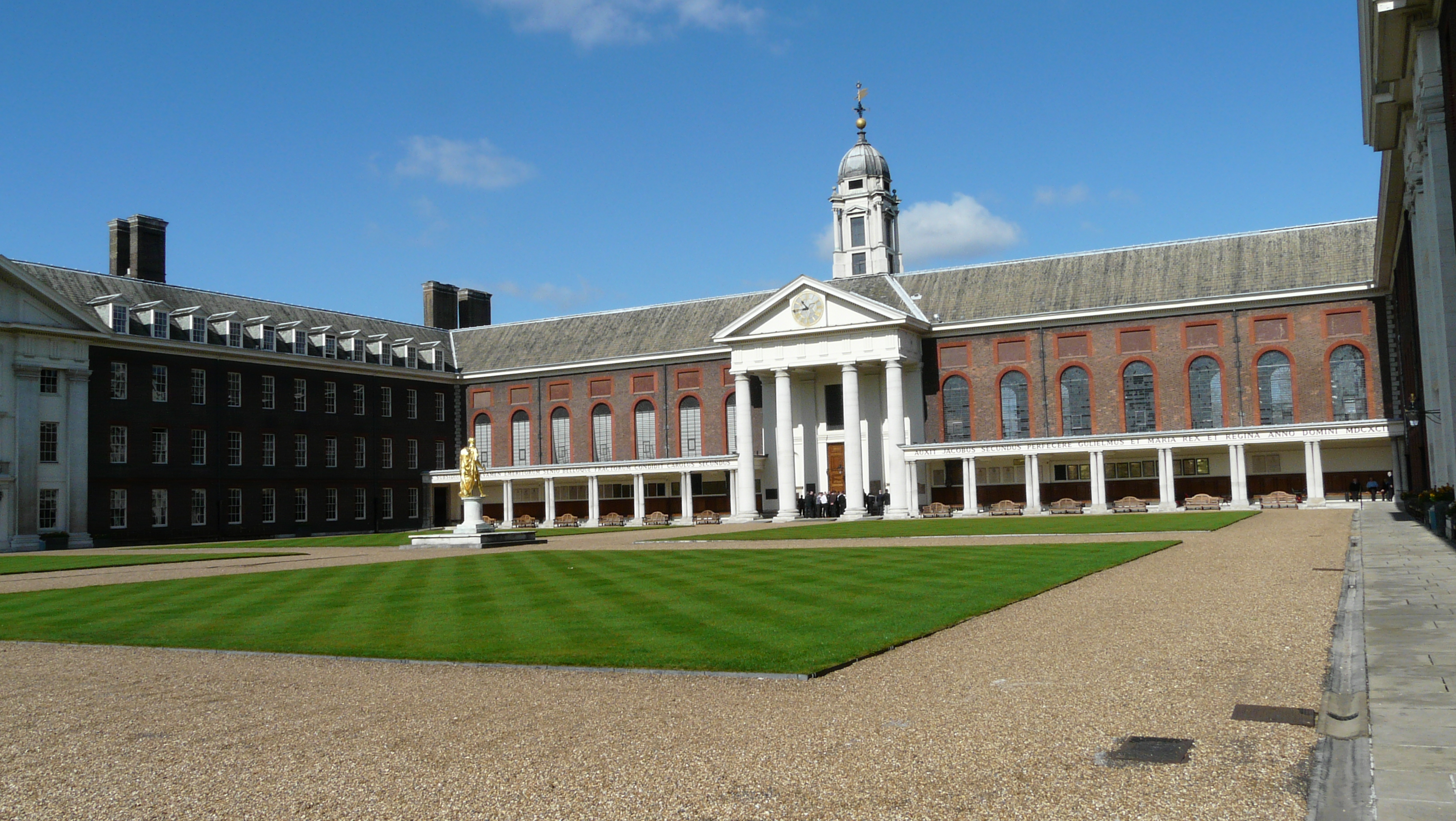
Royal Hospital Chelsea (1692) Christopher Wren, a restrained design with brick facades that resemble terraces.

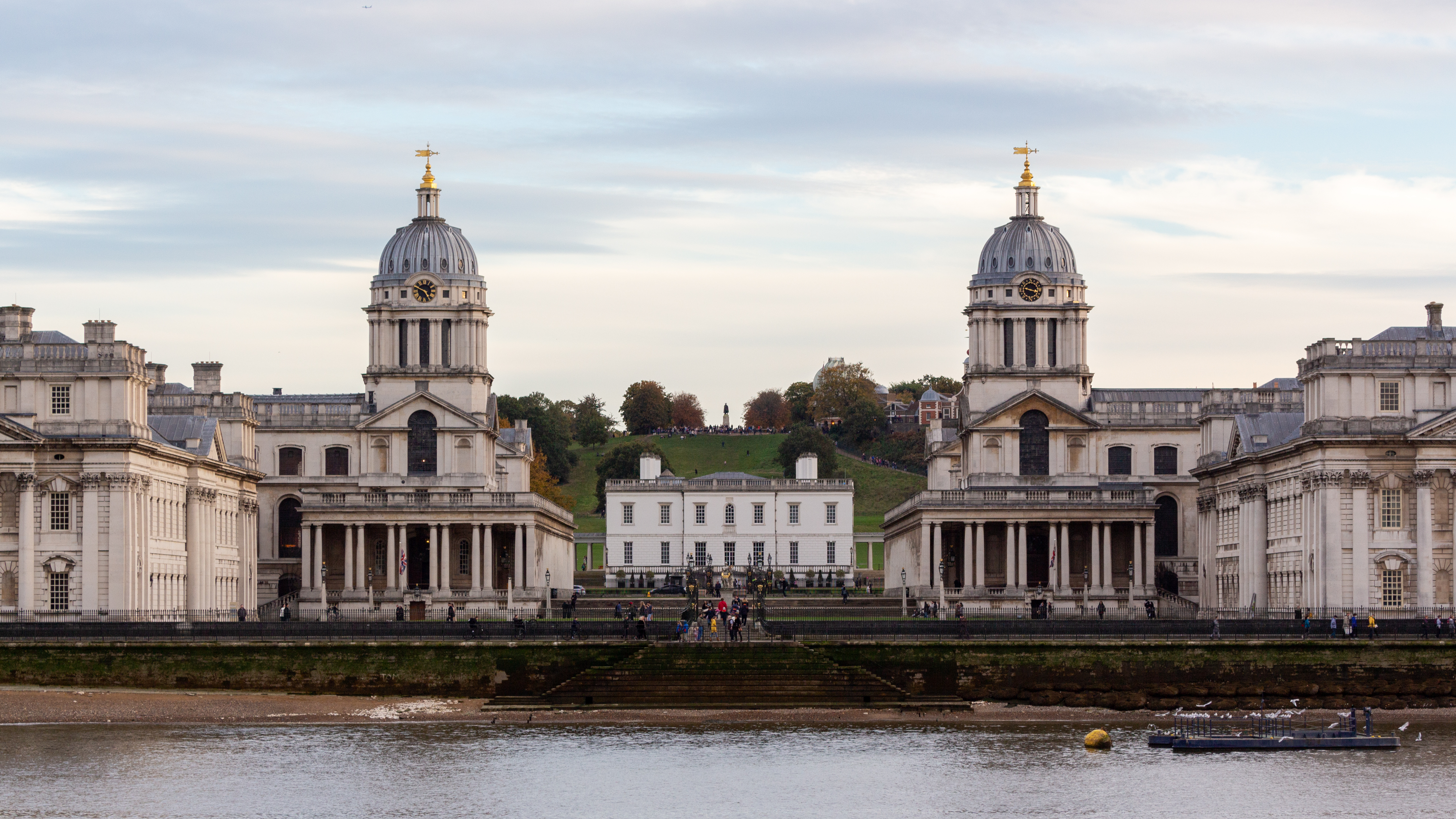
The Old Royal Naval College (1712); widely regarded the masterpiece of the English Baroque style, it forms an ensemble with Queen's House (1635) by Inigo Jones.

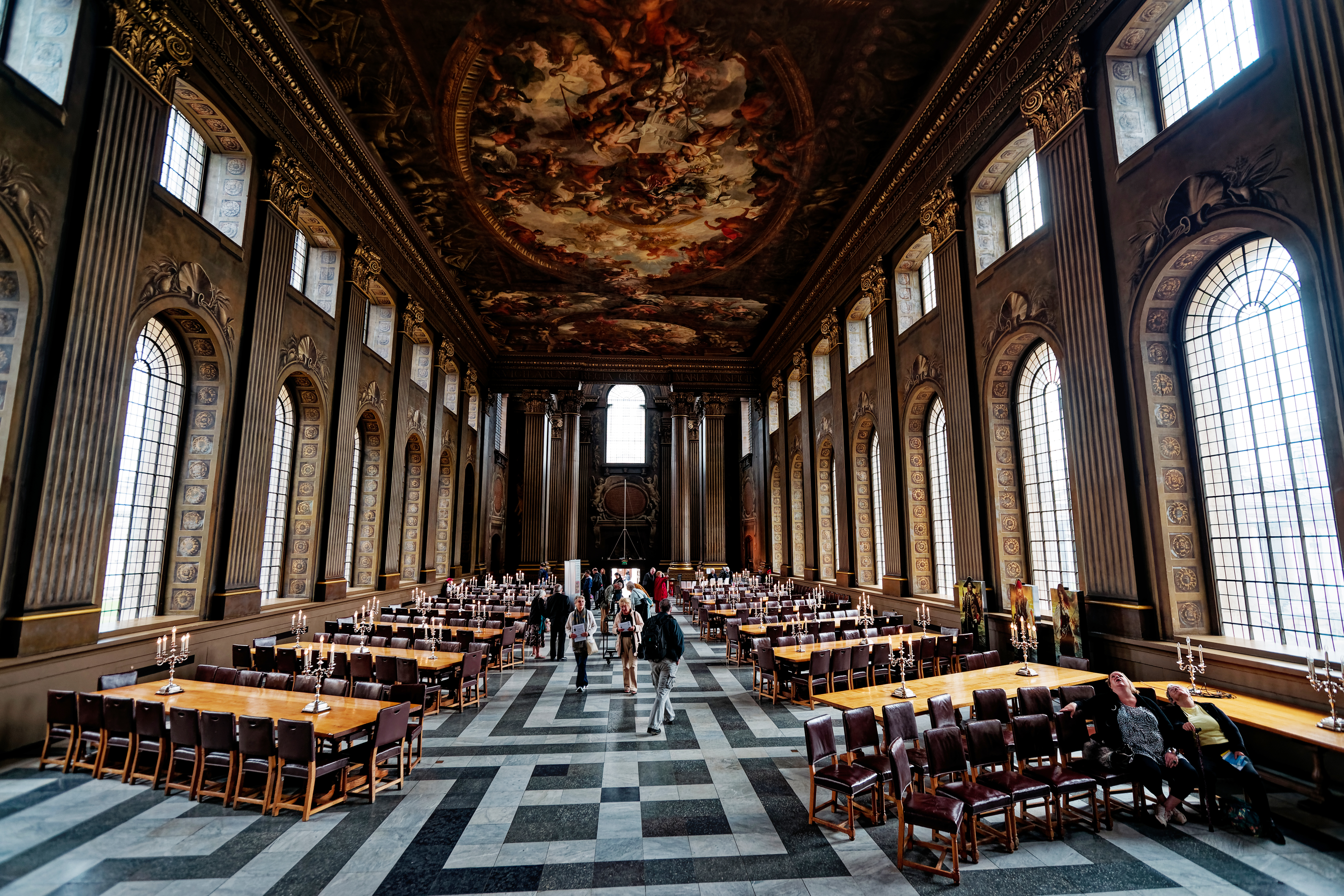
The famous painted hall of Old Royal Naval College, with wall and ceiling paintings by James Thornhill (1726)

Christopher Wren, as well as presiding over London's post-fire reconstruction, was also tasked with the design of two new military hospitals: the Royal Hospital Chelsea for army veterans completed in 1692, and the Greenwich Hospital (latterly known as the Old Royal Naval College) completed in 1712. Royal Hospital Chelsea is one of Wren's more restrained works, with its red brick facades resembling long residential terraces, but it nonetheless has a fine chapel and great hall with decorative interiors. In contrast, Old Royal Naval College is a truly opulent baroque design, which is widely considered to be the pinnacle of the English Baroque style. This is exemplified by the famous Painted Hall, with its elaborate Baroque painted walls and ceiling by James Thornhill, who worked on the room between 1707 and 1726, the largest painted ceiling and interior in Britain.

As with the city churches, this complex of buildings was a collaboration between Wren and Nicholas Hawksmoor, with many sections displaying the latter's distinctive monumental style. The design made careful consideration of existing buildings, namely the Queen's House by Inigo Jones, which is framed by the east and west wings, as well as John Webb's uncompleted Greenwich Palace which was incorporated into the new complex. Wren's Royal Observatory, Greenwich (1675) on the hill to the south is also a dramatic addition to this picturesque ensemble. The result is a dramatically set group of buildings which appear to be part of a unified plan despite being built in different periods and designed by several different architects. The complex is now part of the UNESCO World Heritage Site: Maritime Greenwich, which is described as "the finest and most dramatically sited architectural ensemble and landscape ensemble in the British Isles."

The Queen Anne Churches

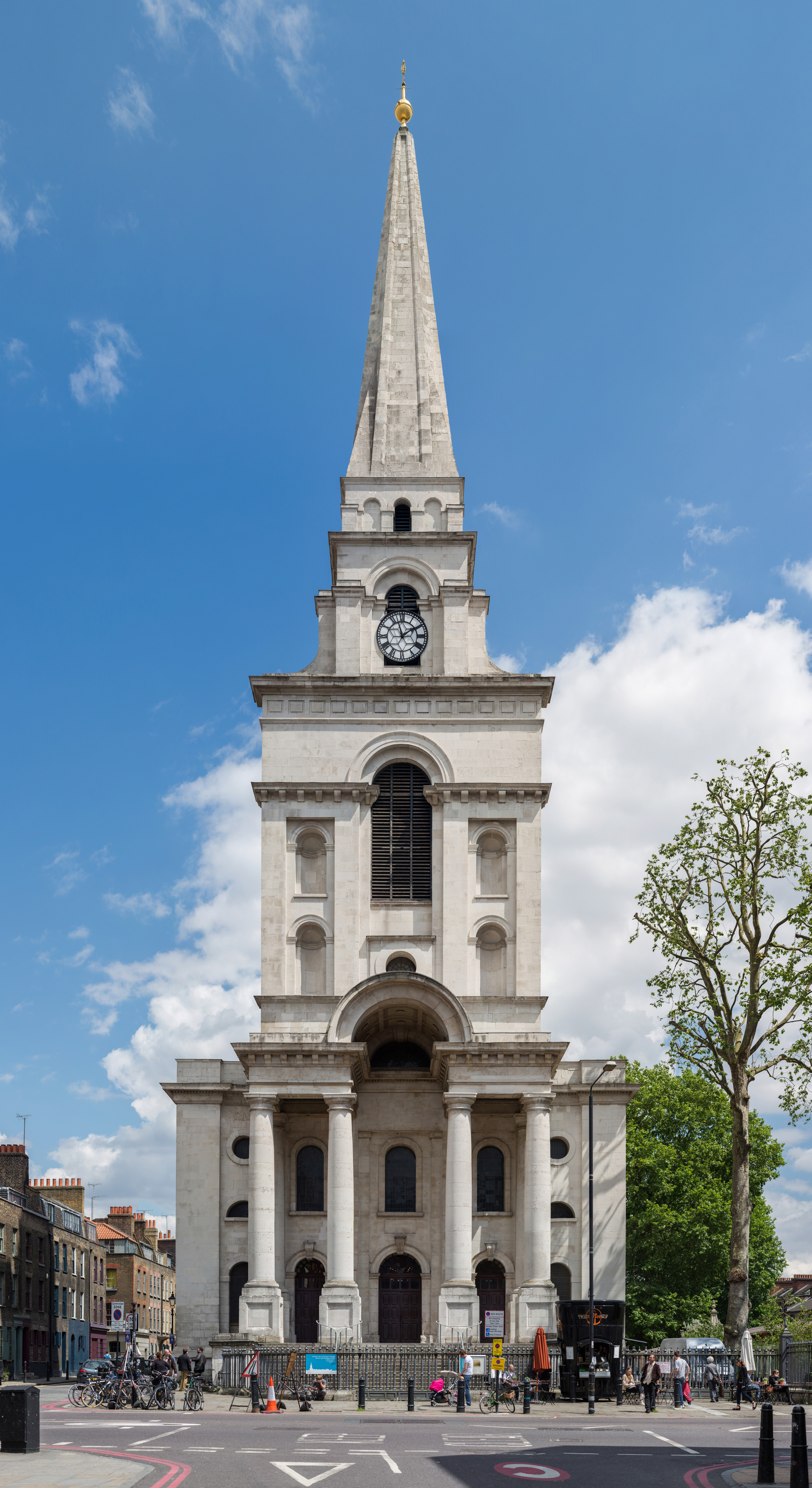
Christ Church Spitalfields (1729) Nicholas Hawksmoor

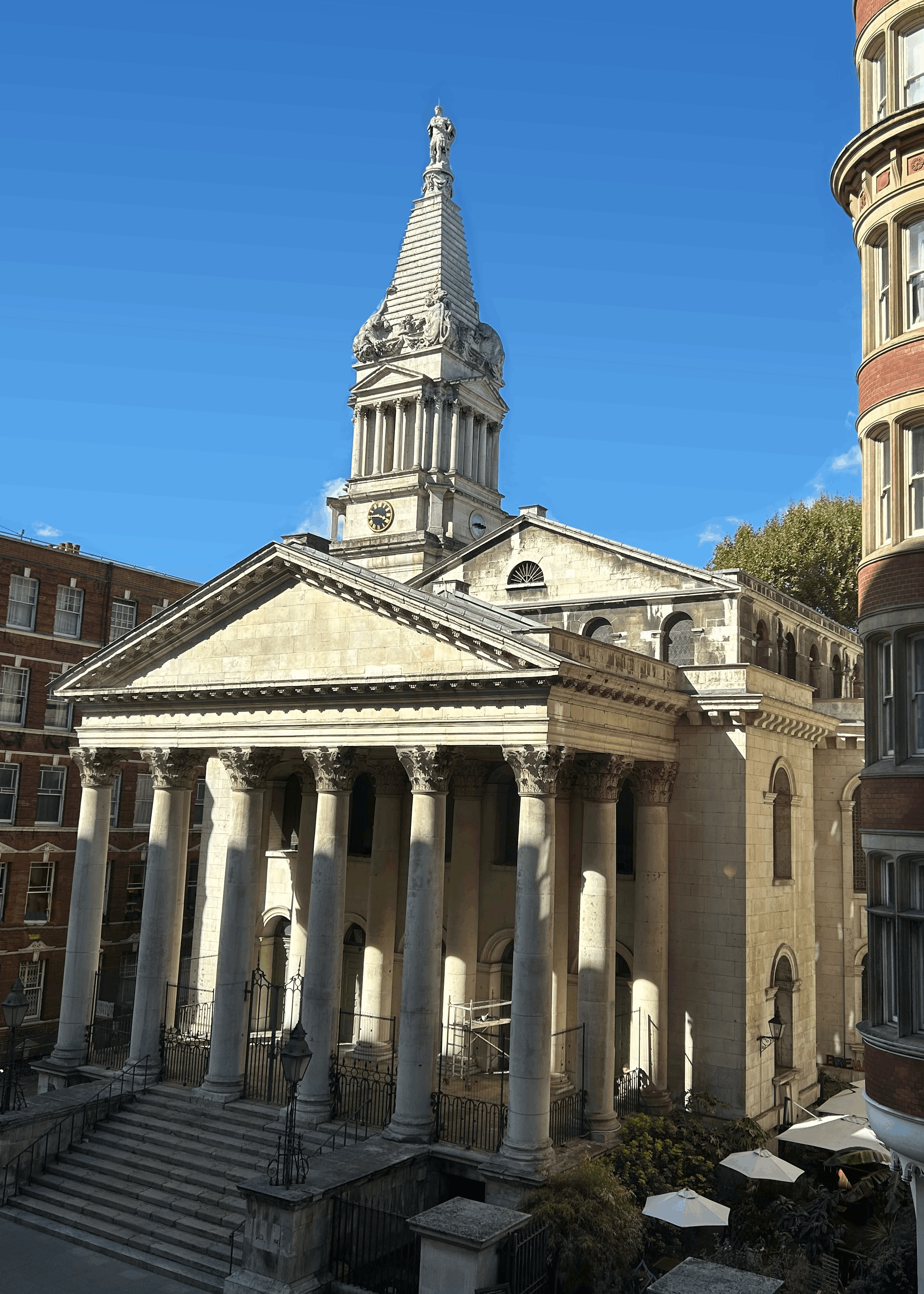
St. George's, Bloomsbury (1731) by Nicholas Hawksmoor

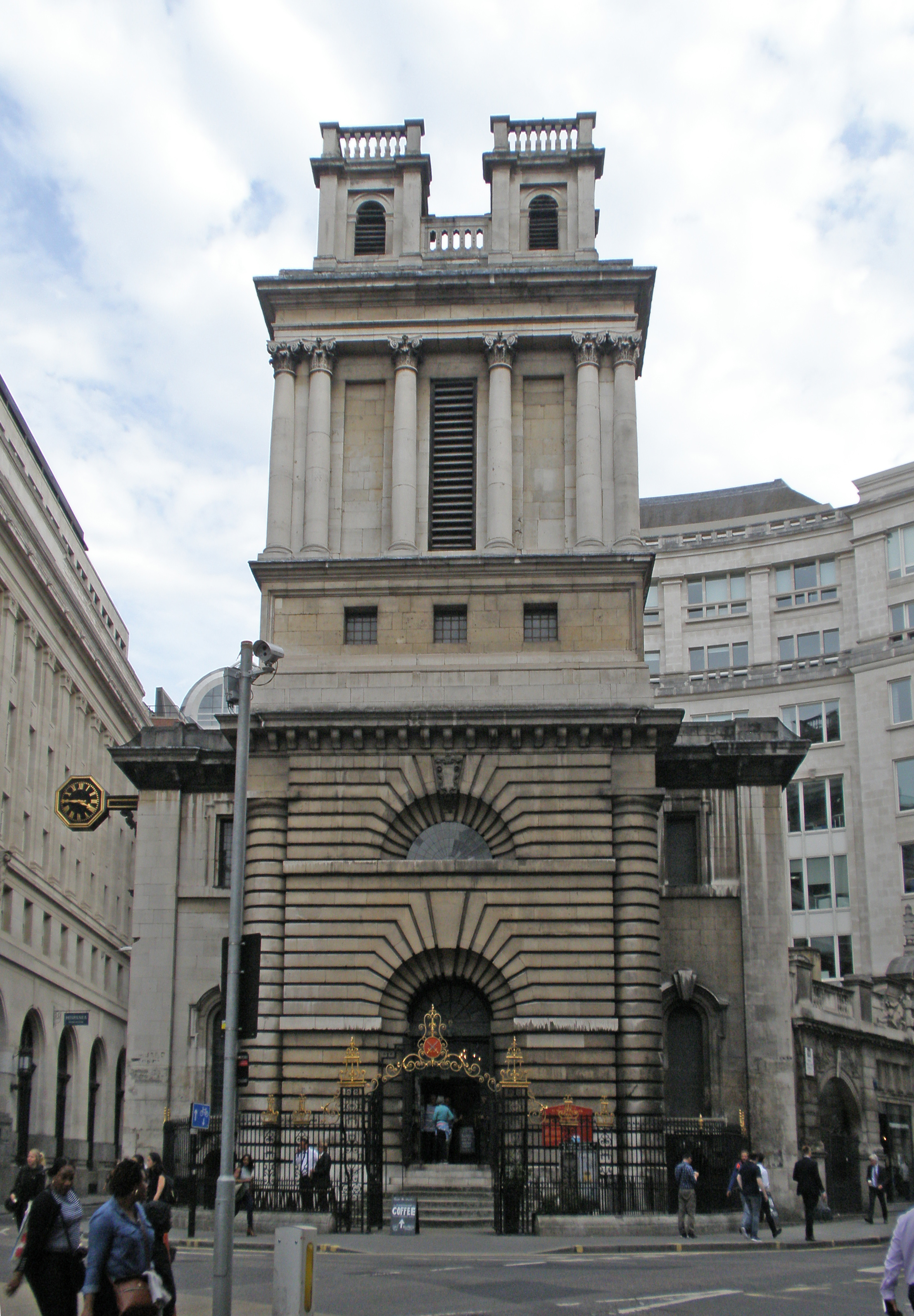
St Mary Woolnoth (1724) by Nicholas Hawksmoor

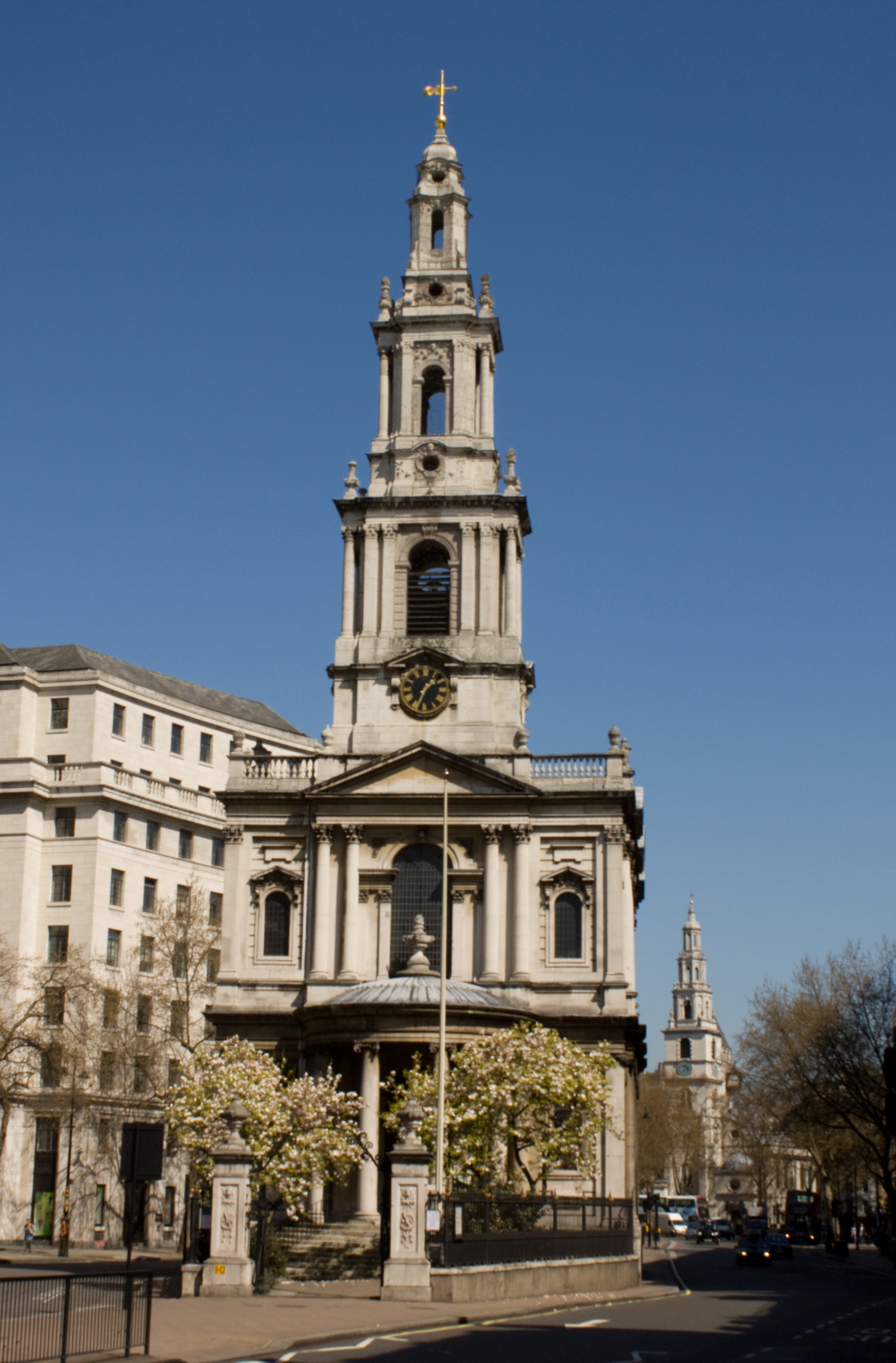
St. Mary le Strand (1723) by James Gibbs

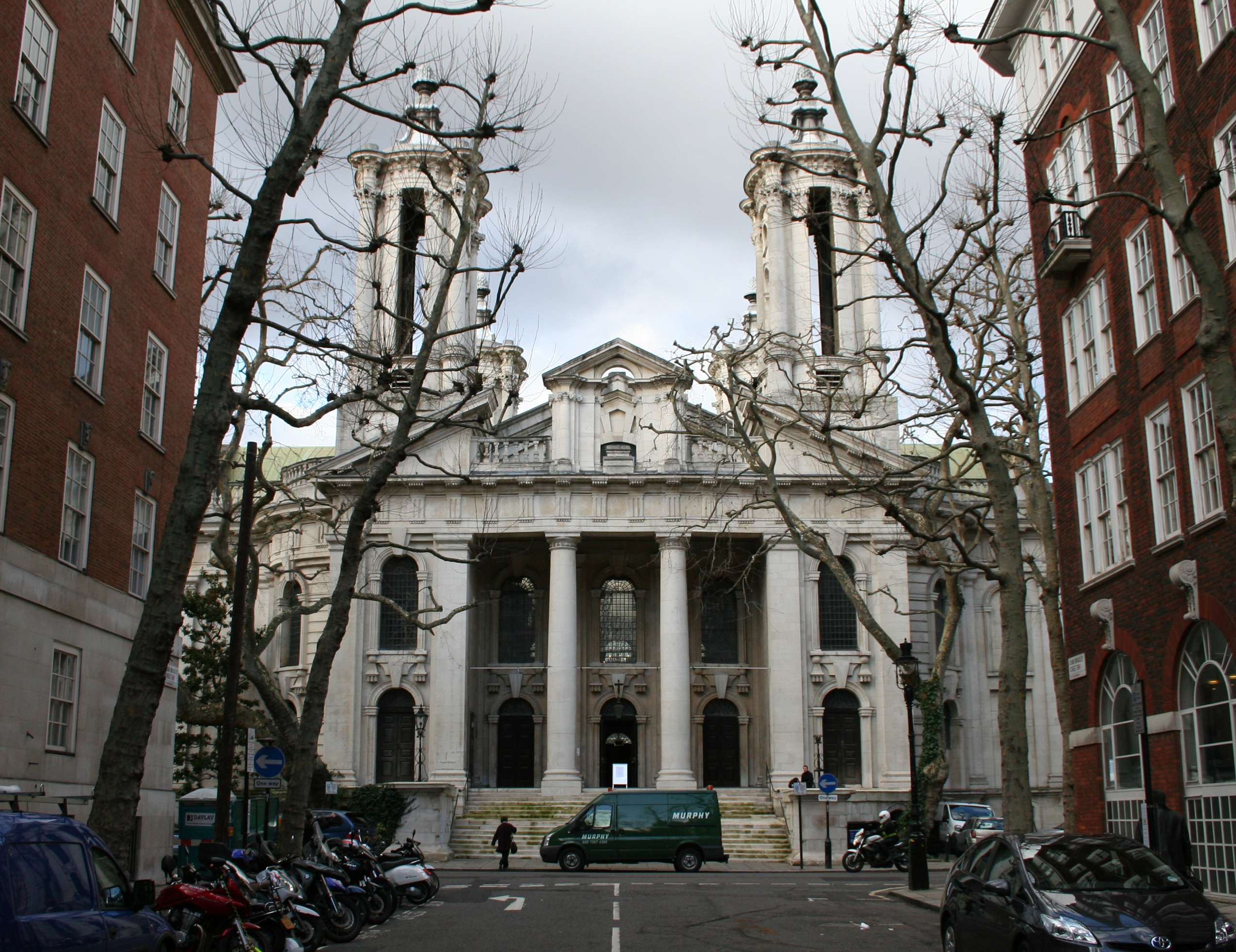
St John's, Smith Square (1728) by Thomas Archer

Some of the finest examples of the latter stages of the English Baroque style built in the reign of Queen Anne are the Commissioners Churches, also known as the Queen Anne Churches. These were built in response to a 1710 act of Parliament requesting 50 new churches in London, but only 12 were built due to limited funds. The majority of these were designed by Nicholas Hawksmoor, who is notable for his unique interpretation of Baroque that draws upon influences from Greek, Roman, Gothic and even Egyptian architecture. Perhaps the most best known of these churches is Christ Church, Spitalfields, which showcases Hawksmoor's ability to create buildings with an imposing sense of monumentality on a small site, described by Richard Morrice as an "idiosyncratic amalgamation of Venetian window, triumphal arch and medieval spire." Some of his other designs utilise unusual archaeological quotations, most notably St. George's, Bloomsbury which combines a large Corinthian portico resembling a Roman Temple, with a tower topped with a pyramid which is a recreation of the Mausoleum at Halicarnassus (4th century BC): one of the Seven Wonders of The Ancient World. The six churches not designed by Hawksmoor were by other significant late Baroque and early Georgian architects such as James Gibbs, whose contribution St Mary-le-Strand (1724) now prominently sits on a traffic island on the Strand in front of Somerset House, with a tower that displays a strong Wren influence. St John's Smith Square by Thomas Archer, was a particularly ornate contribution, which displays a strong Italian influence and is dramatically set at the Centre of a square of early Georgian terraced houses. As the Georgian period began, the Baroque style began to decline in popularity being supplanted by a more restrained Palladian approach to classicism. However, many late Baroque architects such as James Gibbs went on to become formative influences on this stylistic shift.

== Georgian (1714–1811) ==
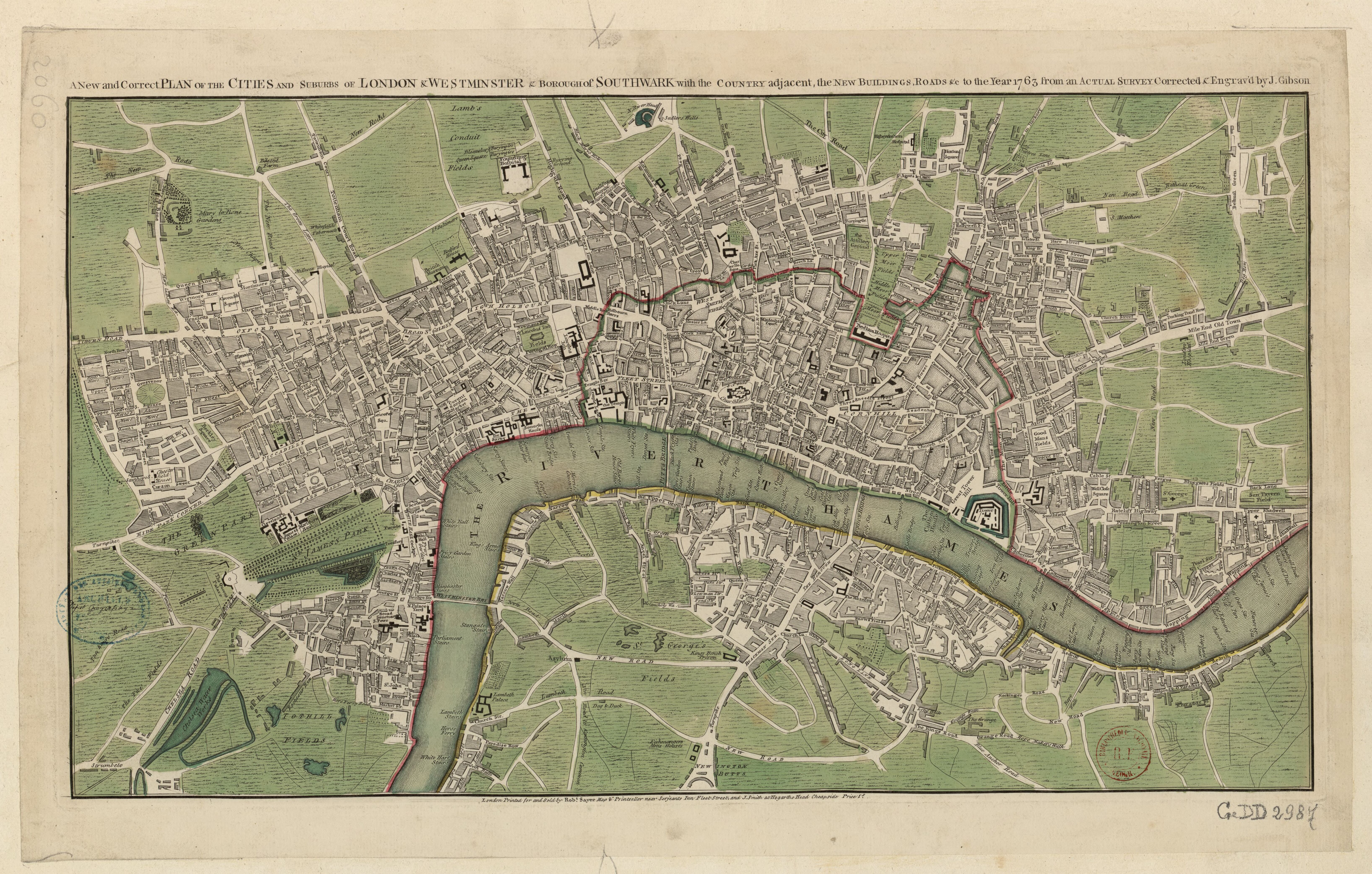
A map of Georgian London from 1763, illustrating how the city had expanded significantly during the 18th-century. The population reached one million in 1801, the largest in Europe at that time.

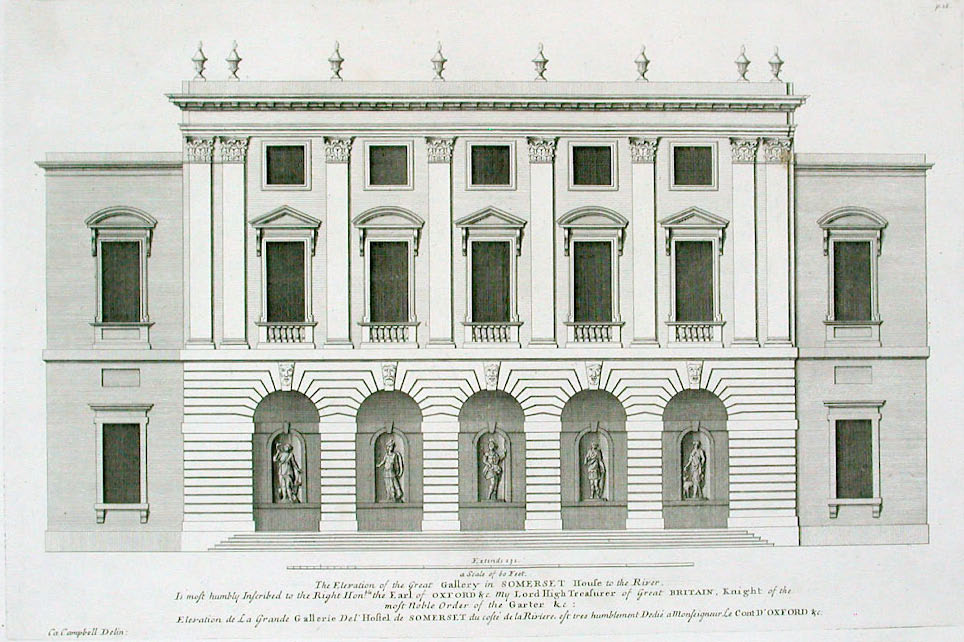
An engraving of the former Somerset House by Inigo Jones (demolished 1775) from Colen Campbell's Vitruvius Britannicus. Such books set the tone of architectural taste in the Georgian era.

The Georgian era (1714–1830) saw substantial economic and colonial expansion as the Britain Empire emerged as a global trading power with London as its centre. This wealth flowed readily into London through its port, with shipping infrastructure being dramatically modernised and expanded in the late-Georgian period with the construction of several enclosed docks. This increased wealth was reflected in London's rapid growth in population during this period, which surpassed one million people for the first time in 1801. As a result, the city sprawled, with substantial new development in the west of the city such as at Bloomsbury, Marylebone, Mayfair and Kensington. This development was frequently centred around the construction of terraces and fashionable new squares like Grosvenor Square and Bedford Square, becoming the home of the burgeoning middle classes that emerged from Britain's new mercantile economy. New working-class neighbourhoods associated with industry and shipping also appeared in the late-Georgian era, particularly in the east such as at Limehouse and Shadwell and with the construction of new bridges across the Thames in the mid-18th-century, the first since the early Middle Ages, the city also began to spread significantly south of the river.

With regards to architectural style, 'Georgian' refers to the British interpretation of 18th-century neoclassical architecture, derived largely from Palladian architecture. The style was largely defined by the publication of books by architects illustrating the designs of buildings which were then utilised as a reference and source of inspiration (or arguably replication) by other architects throughout Britain. Often described as the 'Father of the Georgian style', Colen Campbell's influential book Vitruvius Britannicus (1725) contains engravings of buildings designed by himself and other great English architects like Inigo Jones, helping to set the more Palladian tone of English architecture for the rest of the 18th century. Equally if not more influential was A Book of Architecture, containing designs of buildings and ornaments (1728) by James Gibbs, which only contained his own designs, as well as speculative unbuilt variations of these. According to John Summerson, the book was "probably the most widely used architecture book of the century, not only throughout Britain, but in the American colonies and the West Indies."

The more restrained style of the mid-late 18th-century was to an extent a reaction against the more exuberant Baroque Style of the late 17th century, with a strict emphasis on plain unadorned brickwork, geometrical harmony and restrained classically inspired ornament. Despite this reactionary motive, Georgian architects nonetheless took great influence from the English Baroque style, particularly in the realm of church design. Some early Georgian architects like James Gibbs started in the Baroque period and then later restrained their work as fashions changed. Some of the significant architects of the period who designed works in London include Robert Adam, William Chambers, James Gibbs, William Kent and James Wyatt. Due to the limited stylistic variation in Georgian Architecture (which was largely due to a homogenisation of taste resulting from books such as Vitruvius Britannicus) as well as the then recent development of London after The Great Fire of London, the Georgian period was arguably the era in which London was at its most architecturally uniform.

=== The Georgian Terraced House ===
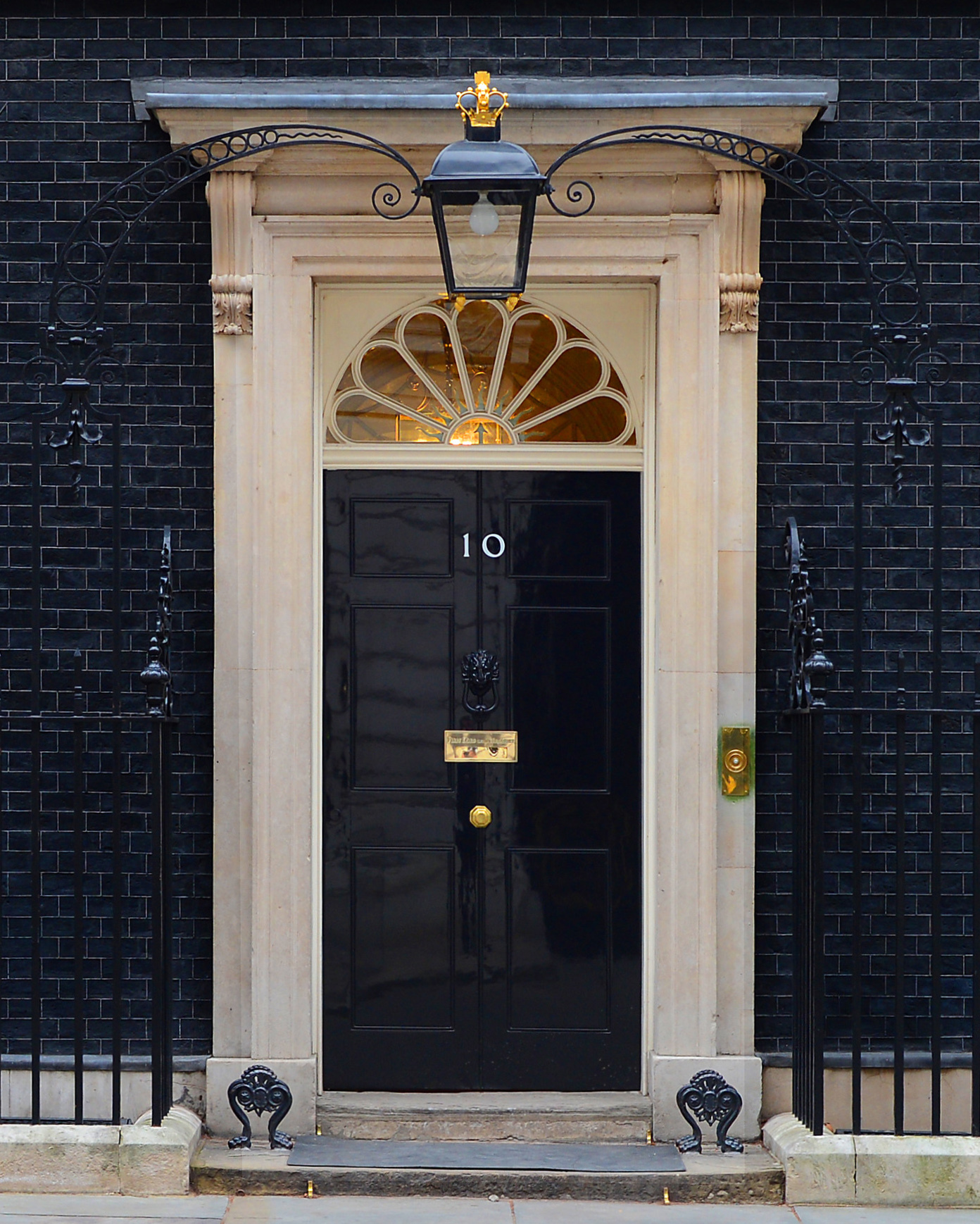
10 Downing Street (1684) shows many stereotypical features of a Georgian terraced house.

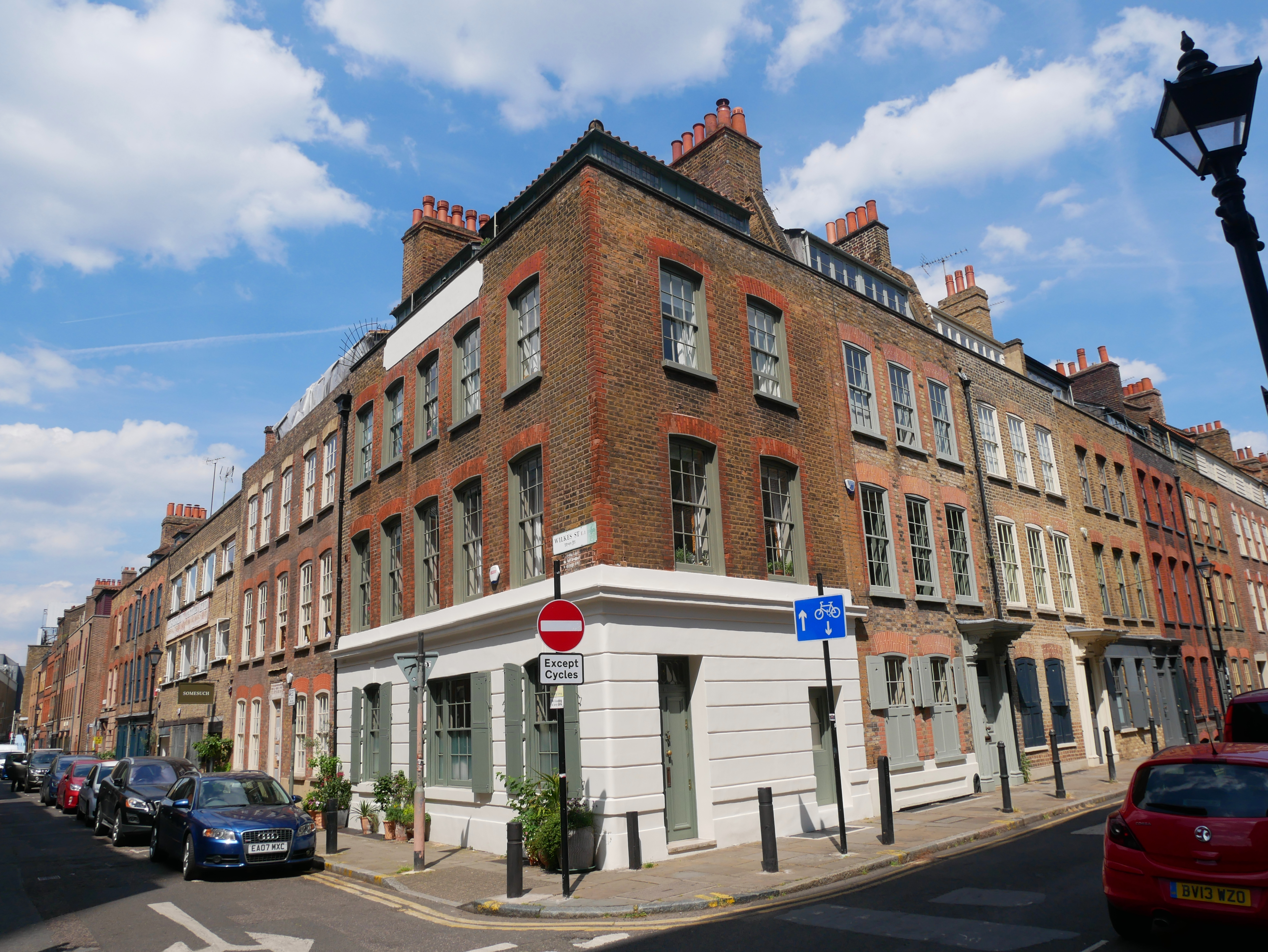
Early Georgian housing (c.1720-30s) in Spitalfields built for Huguenot silk weavers. This is one of the best-preserved early Georgian neighbourhoods in London, such as at Fournier Street.

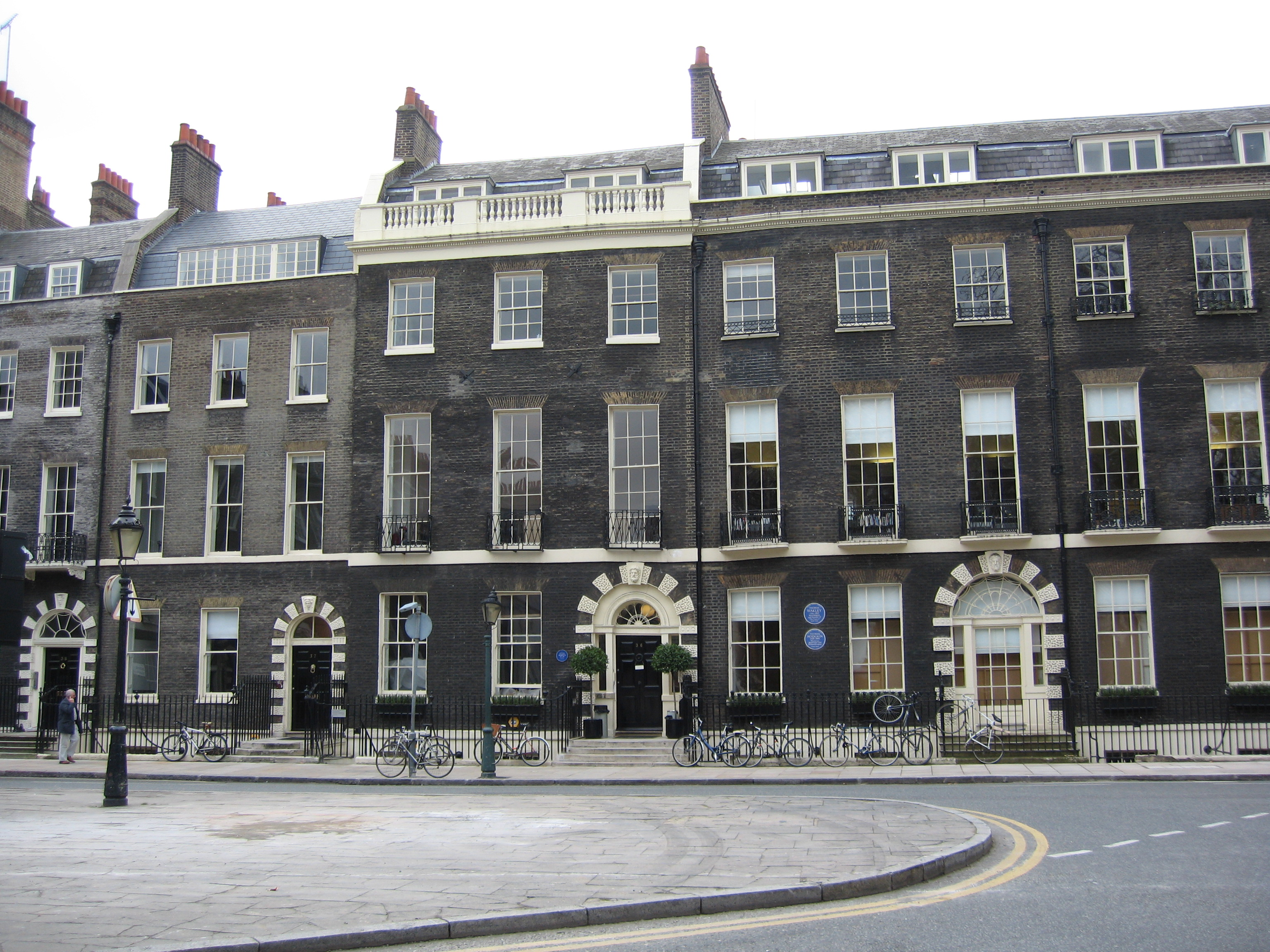
Late Georgian terraces (c. 1783) on Bedford Square in Bloomsbury, one the grandest and best preserved Georgian squares in London. The houses feature the decorative use of stucco on the exterior.

The building type most strongly associated with the Georgian period in London is undoubtedly The Georgian terraced house. The genesis of this iconic building type in London can be somewhat traced to the reconstruction of the city after The Great Fire of 1666, which introduced building regulations that standardised plot size, building height and use of brick in all new houses. This resulted in the construction of neat brick terraces of uniform proportion and style, with the terrace at King's Bench Walk, Temple (1677) being a notable surviving example which foreshadowed the basic format of most housing in London during the 18th-century. Georgian terraced houses in London are distinctive for their sunken basement built on brick arch foundations, rusticated base storey, taller piano nobile reception floor and attic storey. They are generally built from buff (pale yellow) London Stock Brick to golden section proportions, often spanning triple bay frontages with 'implied' columns or pilasters and carefully proportioned and very large off-white sash windows, slate mansard roofs above an Attic pediment. A typical Georgian house was designed to accommodate a single family, with front and back rooms on each floor and a partial-width rear 'closet' wing projection. The ground floor was reserved for business, the tall piano nobile for formal entertaining, and upper storeys with family bedrooms all accessed from a side stair. Servants were accommodated in the below-ground kitchen and in attic rooms in the roof. Each of the distinctions in function was subtly indicated in the decorative scheme of the façade by the sequential height of openings, projecting cornices and restrained decorative mouldings such as round-headed arches and rustication at the base and diminishing columns, sculptural capitals, balustrades and friezes expressing the top.

They were grouped in formal garden squares, crescents and terraces with wide pavements supported on brick vaults on wide, straight public streets, often with private access to romantically landscaped gardens. Later encroachment of commercial properties has significantly reduced the width of historic streets in many parts of London, where the original plans were comparable to those found in Continental urban planning. Parts of London which still retain significant numbers of early Georgian houses are Spitalfields, many of which have continental features; Meard Street in Soho which has houses dating from the 1720s and Smith Square in Westminster, with houses dating from as early as 1726. Mid-late Georgian houses are still numerous in areas such as Bloomsbury, Islington, Marylebone and Mayfair, where they are often built around garden squares. Perhaps the finest and most complete of these squares is Bedford Square in Bloomsbury, which contains some particularly fine houses with heavy use of white stucco. Another notable example is Fitzroy Square, Fitzrovia, with notably grand houses on the eastern and southern sides by Robert Adam (1792), which have Portland stone facades, ionic pilasters and neoclassical friezes, making the combined terrace appear as one large façade to increase grandeur

=== The Georgian Aristocratic Townhouse ===
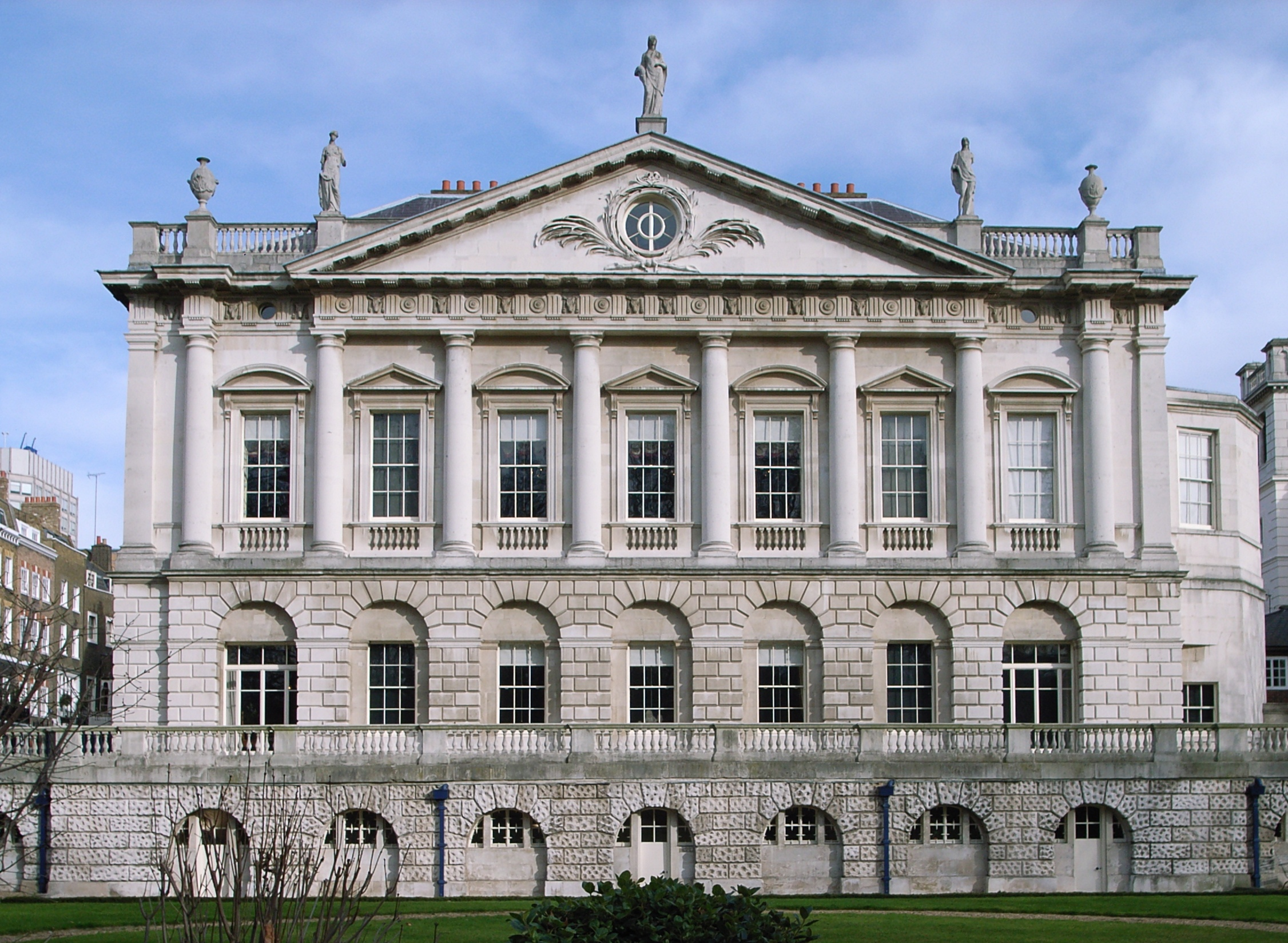
Spencer House (1756) John Vardy: one of London's grandest surviving aristocratic townhouses, built in a Palladian style with heavy rustication, use of Portland stone and Neoclassical statues on the roof line.

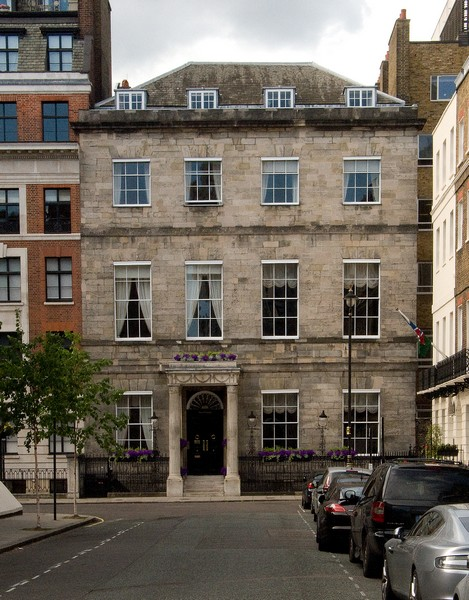
Chandos House (1771) by Robert Adam: a grand townhouse with the understated exterior of a terraced house.

The Albany (1776) by William Chambers: a Late-Georgian townhouse with a restrained Palladian exterior and concealed usage of London brick.

Georgian houses in London did not just come in the form of simple terraces; the upper classes commissioned much larger and opulent houses known as townhouses, which acted as their urban residence whilst retaining their country house or stately home as their primary residence. This is in contrast to other European countries like Italy in which the upper classes primarily lived in large urban palaces like The Palazzo Farnese (1537) in Rome. As a result, central London lacks aristocratic houses or palaces on this scale. The grandest of the London townhouses were large detached buildings like Spencer House but some were terraced house like Chandos House. In the Georgian period many of these grand houses once lined Piccadilly and Park Lane but the majority of these were demolished as they went out of fashion in the late-19th and early-20th centuries. A notable example was Devonshire House on Piccadilly, a large Palladian mansion. The few that do survive to this day include Apsley House, Burlington House (now heavily altered) Cambridge House, Chandos House, Home House, Lancaster House, Marlborough House, Melbourne House and Spencer House. Whilst often lacking grandeur on the exterior, these townhouses often have far more lavish interiors, with examples such as Home House (1777) being designed by Robert Adam.

=== Georgian Stately Homes ===
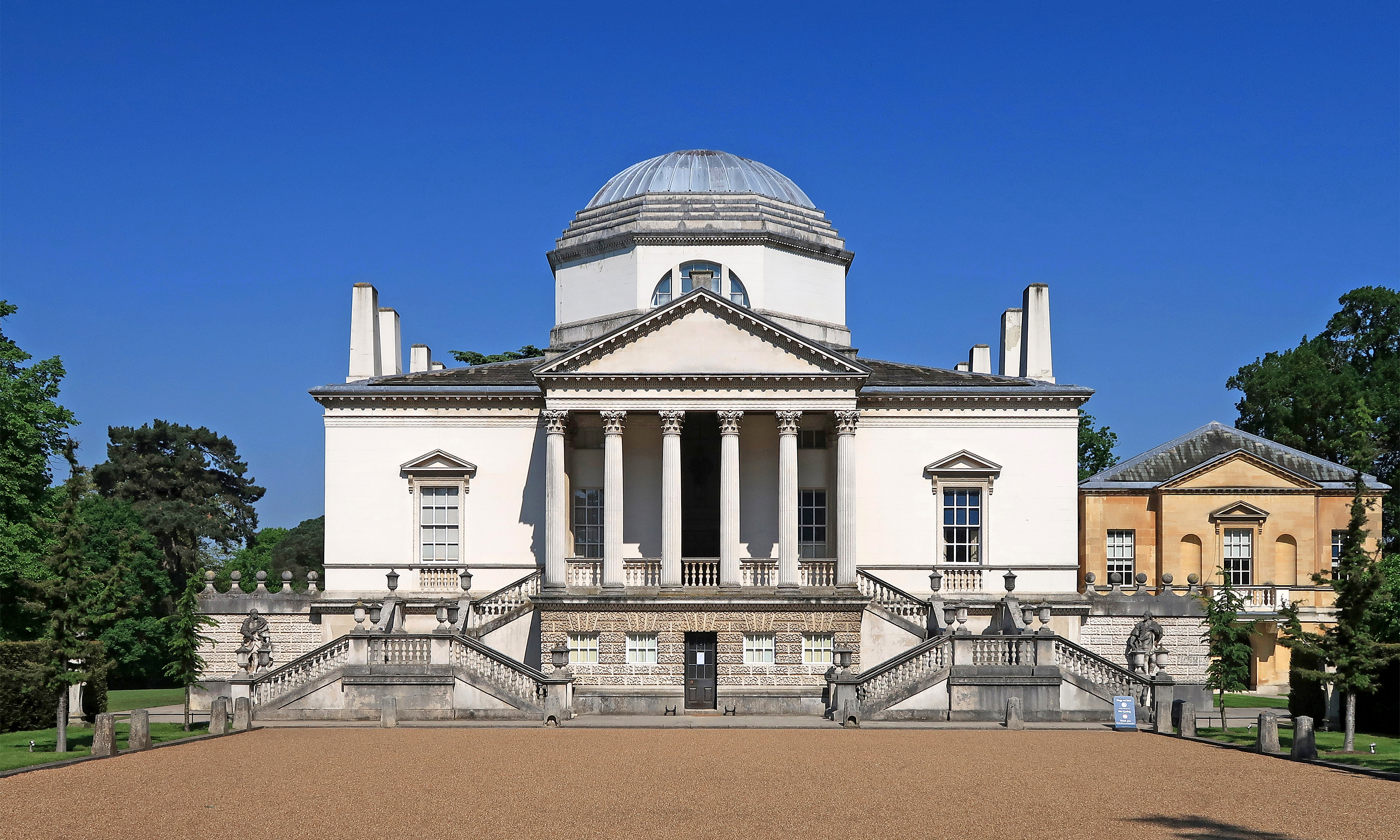
The purist Palladian Architecture of Chiswick House (1729) by Richard Boyle, with influential gardens by William Kent.

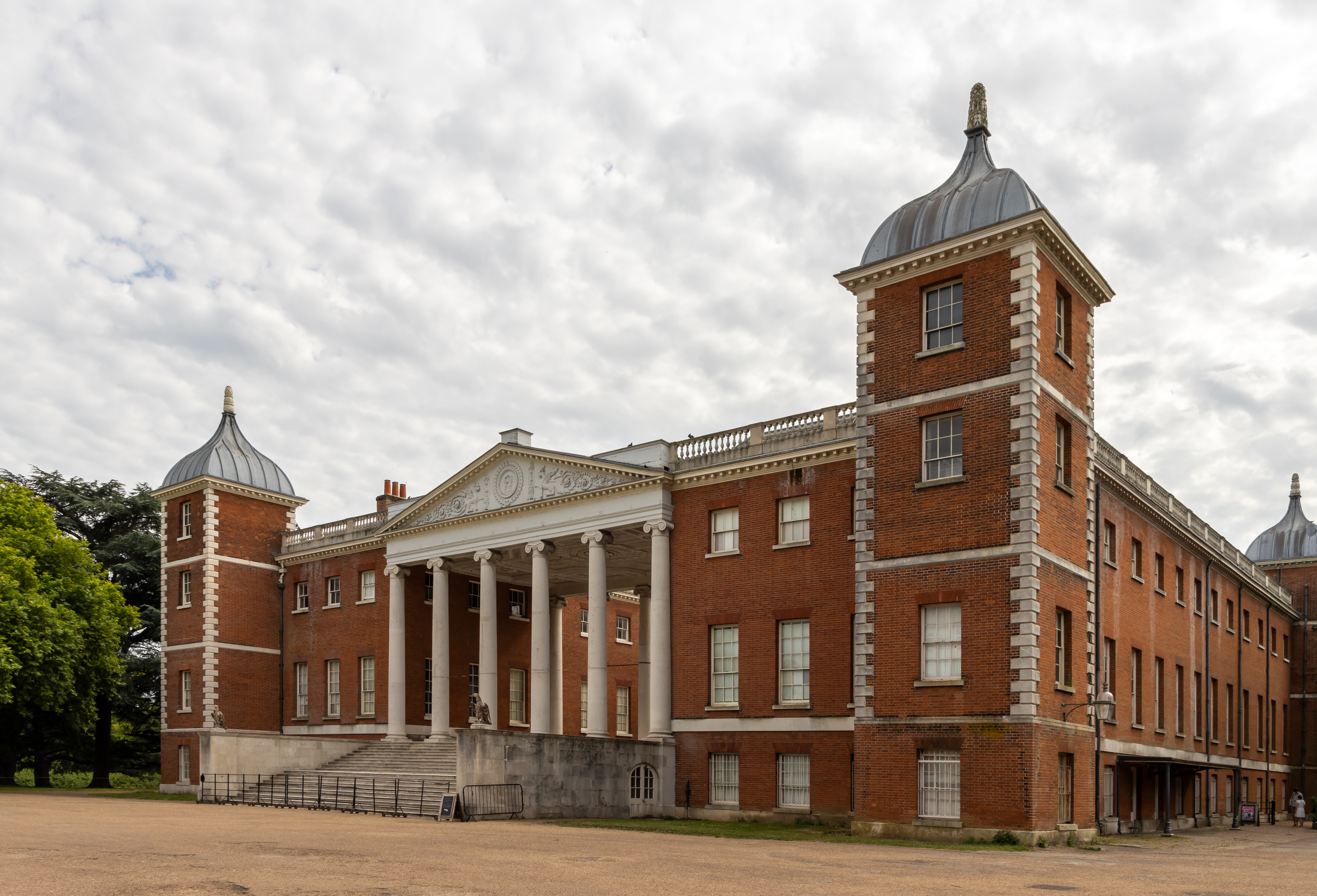
Osterley Park (1765) by Robert Adam, who also designed much of the interiors for which he is most famous.

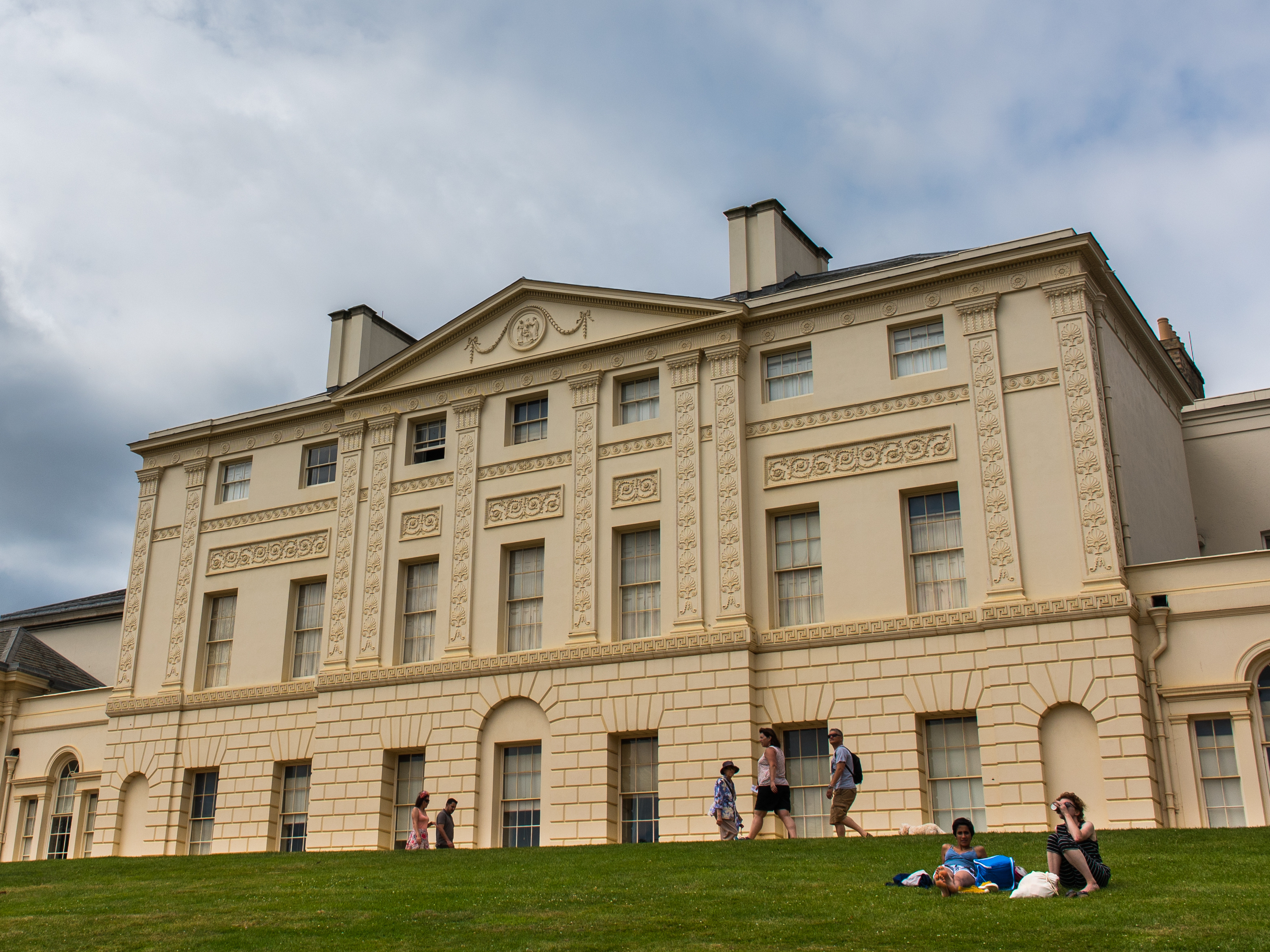
Kenwood House (1779) by Robert Adam. This house is now open to the public as an art gallery.

Alongside aristocratic townhouses, in the broader Greater London area there are a number of Georgian stately homes, which would have originally been rural in setting when first built but are now within Greater London as a result of urban expansion. As described in the previous section, within the Georgian aristocracy the rural stately home was typically far grander than their metropolitan residence, making such houses the most superlative examples of Georgian residential architecture in Britain. A particularly notable Early-Georgian stately home is Chiswick House (1729) by Richard Boyle: a self-taught amateur who built the house for himself. A faithful attempt at recreating an Italian Palladian villa, the house is square, symmetrical in plan with a central dome and a Corinthian portico on one side. The most influential element of this building was arguably its gardens designed by William Kent, which is widely considered to be one of the first true English landscape gardens which became very popular later in the Georgian period with designers such as Capability Brown and was an integral part of the early Romantic movement in England. The garden contains several small classical style 'temples', which are intended as landscape features, precursors of the large follies built in the grounds of stately homes later in the century. Other notable example of stately homes in Greater London include, Kenwood House (1779) Osterley Park (1765) and Syon House (1769), all of which were designed by the neoclassical architect and interior designer Robert Adam. These houses are nationally notable for their Adam's interiors, considered by some to be the finest surviving examples in existence. Many of these grand house are house are now open to the public, being owned by charities such as the National Trust.

=== Georgian Civic Architecture ===
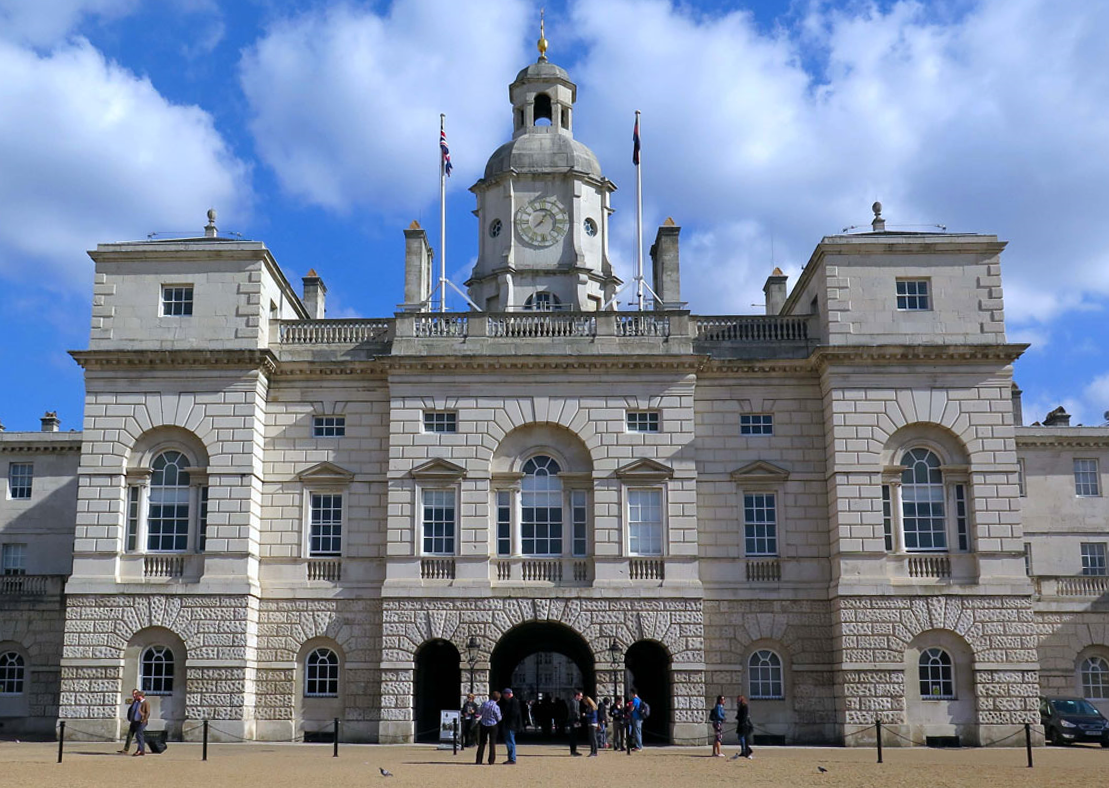
Horse Guards (1759), a notably austere example of mid-18th-century Palladianism by William Kent, with heavy rustication functioning as the main form of external decoration.

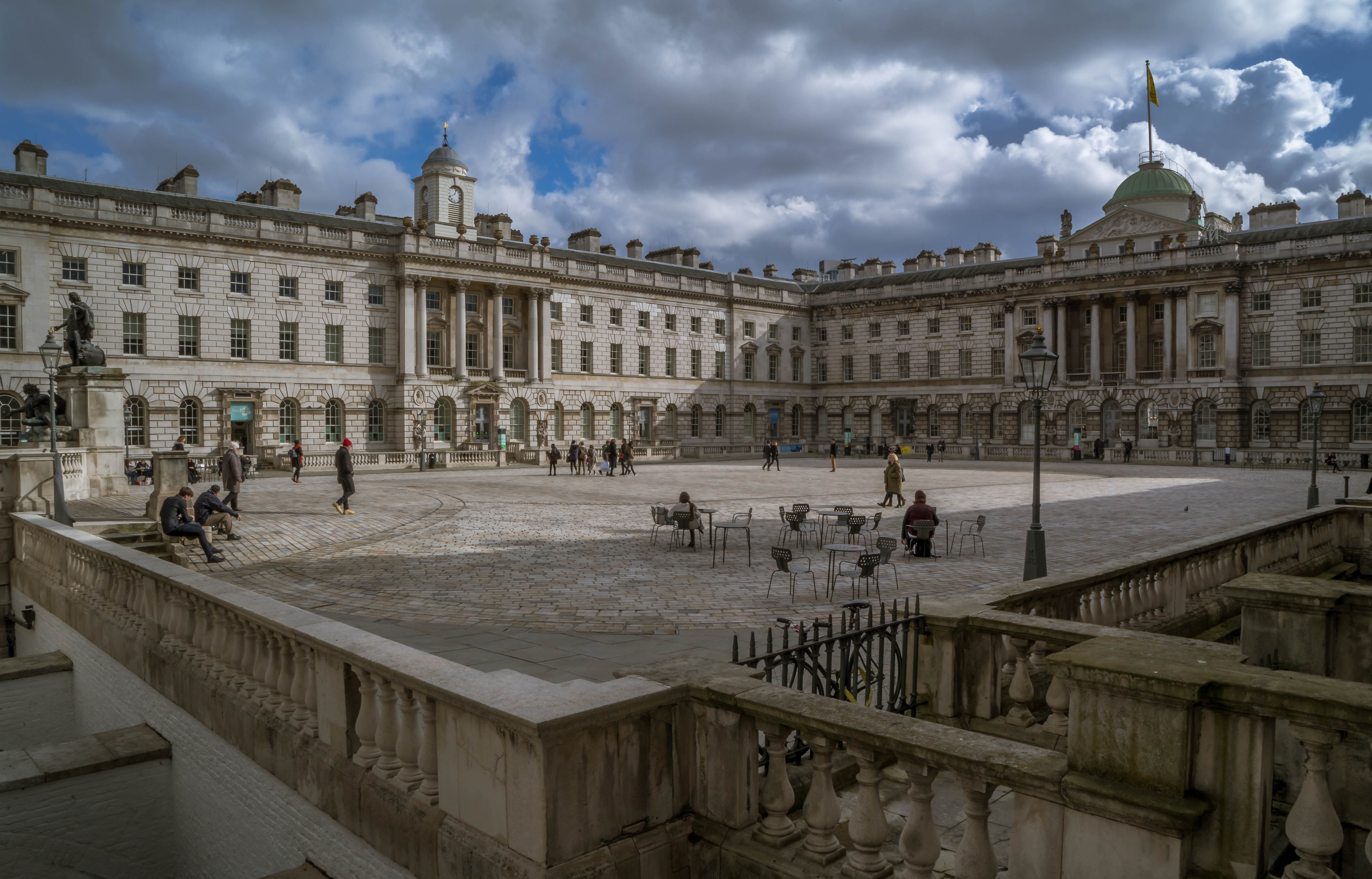
Somerset House (1776) by William Chambers, the most substantial civic building built in London in the Georgian period, which represents a more Greek influenced variation of late-Georgian Palladianism.

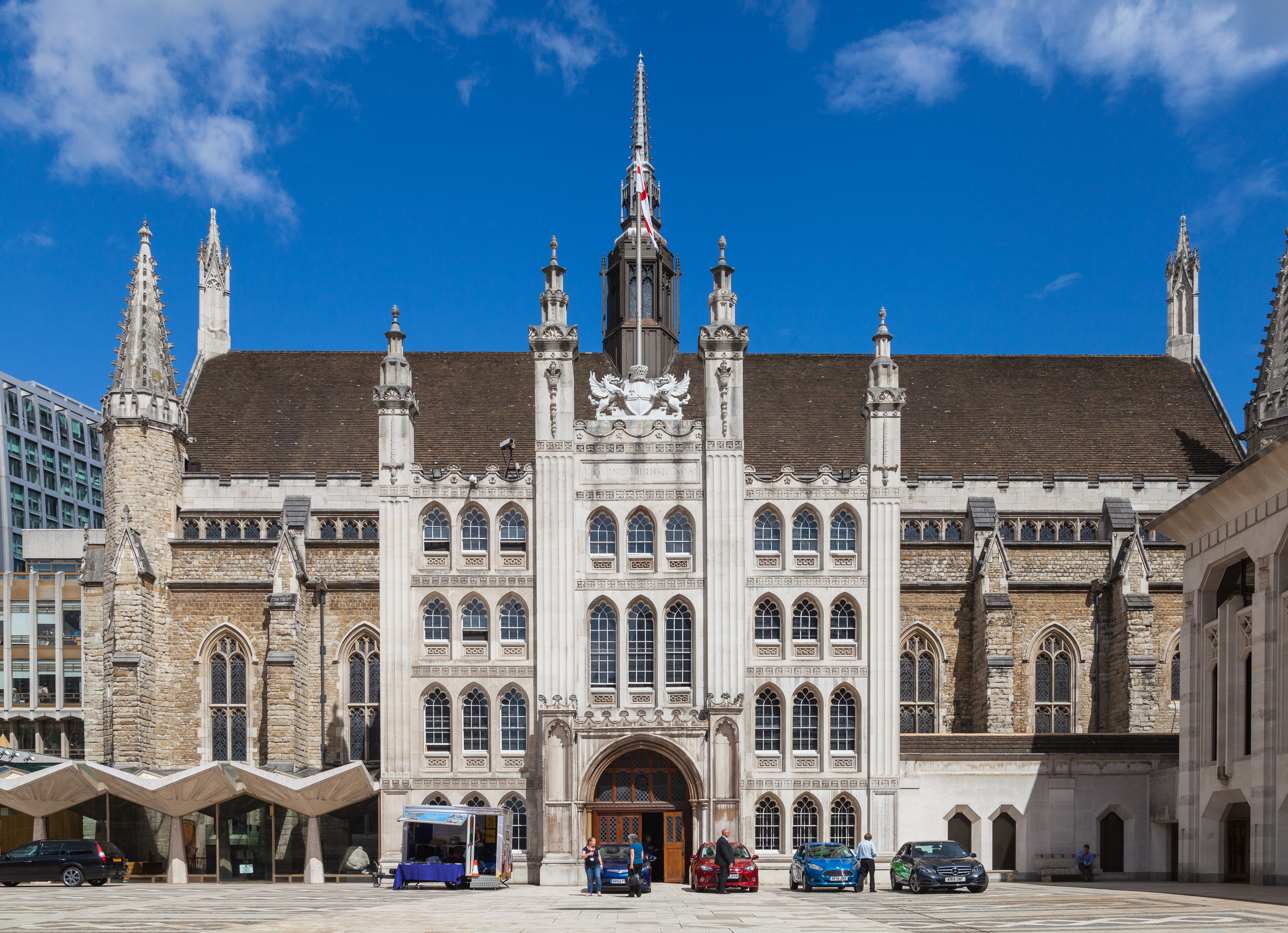
The Georgian facade of The Guildhall (1789) George Dance II: an eccentric early example of Gothic-Revival Architecture which also references Indian Architecture.

There was also a crossover between English Baroque and Palladianism in early Georgian civic architecture. The best example is St Bartholomew's Hospital (1732), also by James Gibbs, which features an opulent Baroque gate house, while the north wing which was completed later is far more restrained. By the middle of the 18th-century civic buildings had become even more minimal and faithfully Palladian. This is best exemplified by William Kent's Horse Guards on Whitehall (1750), which almost entirely lacks decorative motifs on the exterior, instead utilising heavy rustication as the primary decorative feature. The most substantial civic building commissioned in London in the Georgian Era was Somerset House (1776), which was built to house government offices, replacing a 16th-century house of the same name on The Strand. The resulting building was designed by William Chambers, built in a quadrangle plan surrounding a large courtyard, with two additional floors below street level. The design utilises the Corinthian order, rustication on the ground floor and neoclassical statues in visual focal points.

=== Georgian Church Architecture ===
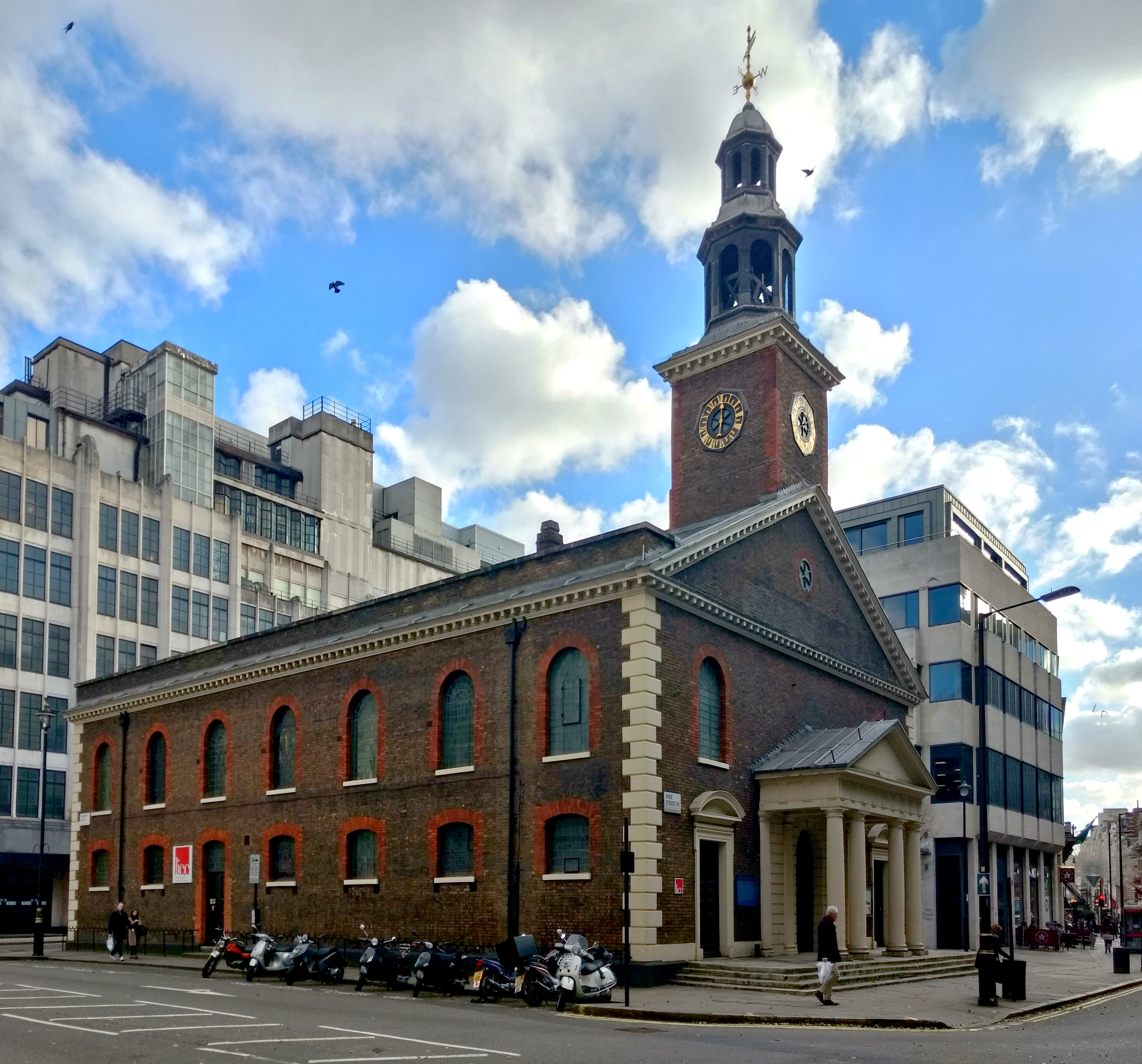
St Peter, Vere Street (1722) by James Gibbs

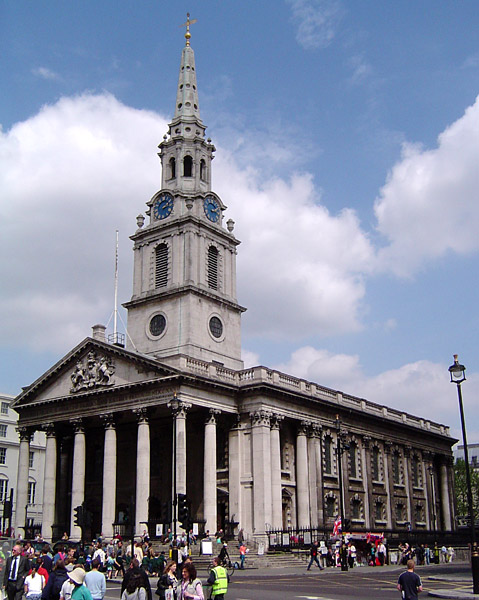
St Martin-in-the-Fields (1726) by James Gibbs.

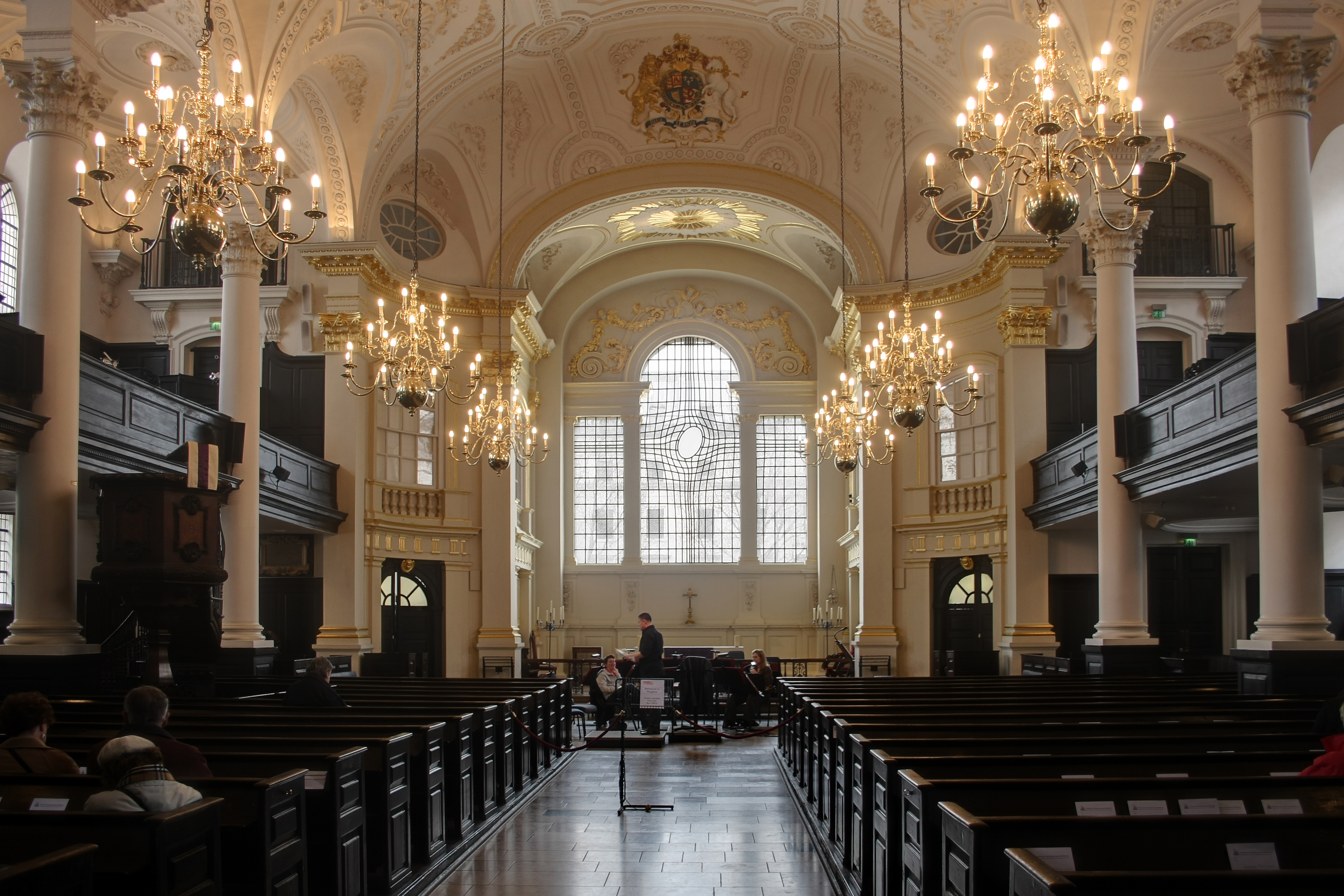
The interior of St Martin-in-the-Fields (1726) by James Gibbs.

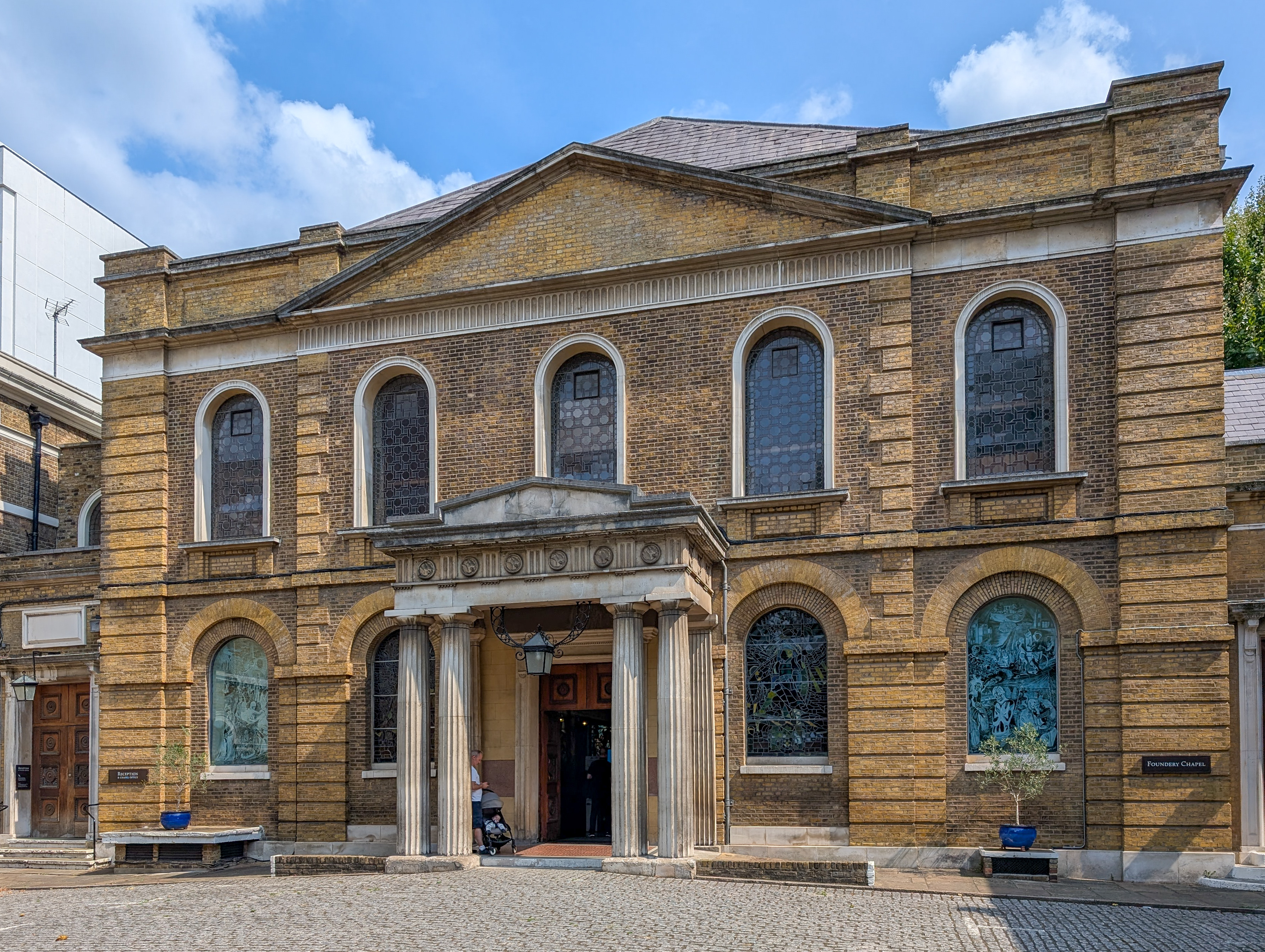
Wesley's Chapel (1778) by George Dance the Younger

Church design in the early Georgian era was still very heavily influenced by the work of Christopher Wren who had pioneered the use of classical architecture in English church design with the city churches. But with the declining popularity of the Baroque style, church design took a more restrained Palladian approach as the 18th century progressed. St Martin-in-the-Fields (1722) by James Gibbs is arguably the archetypal church of the period which set the stylistic tone for English church design for the rest of the century. It is a simple neo-classical 'temple church' consisting of a monumental Corinthian portico, a simple rectangular nave and a tall spire that evokes Wren's city churches. This building is a case-study in the transition between the English Baroque and Georgian styles. Whilst the simplicity of the overall format is very Georgian in character, the elaborate exterior decorative motifs (such as the key stones around the windows) allude to a continuing baroque influence, a result of the fact that James Gibbs was originally a practitioner of the Baroque style. The format of this church was much copied across Britain and abroad, with notable examples being St Andrew's in the Square (1756) in Glasgow and St. Paul's Chapel (1766) in New York City. Georgian architecture in London became progressively more restrained as the 18th-century progressed, exhibiting a stronger Palladian influence. A good early example of this is another church by James Gibbs: St Peter, Vere Street completed in 1722, a very simple design with mostly brick facades and St.Botolph without Bishopsgate by James Gold completed in 1729. A more extreme example is Wesley's Chapel by George Dance the Younger (1778), a very retrained design in line with Methodist principles, that more closely resembles domestic architecture.

=== Bridges and Shipping Architecture ===
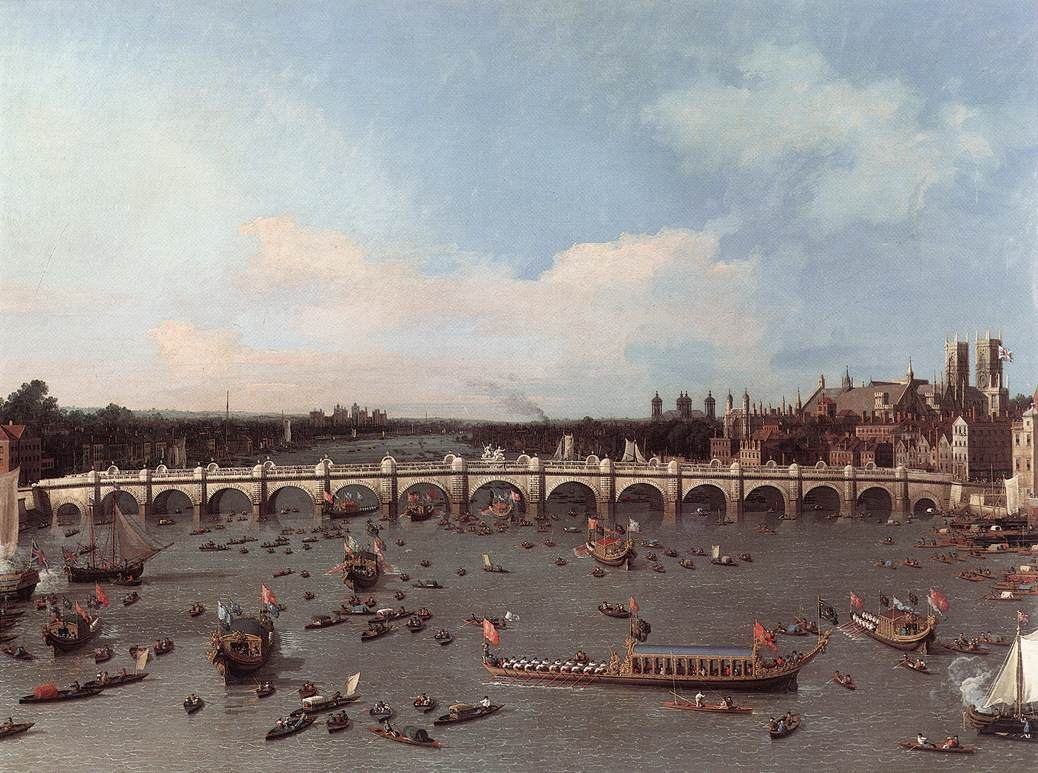
Painting by Caneletto from 1747 of the first incarnation of Westminster Bridge completed in 1738.

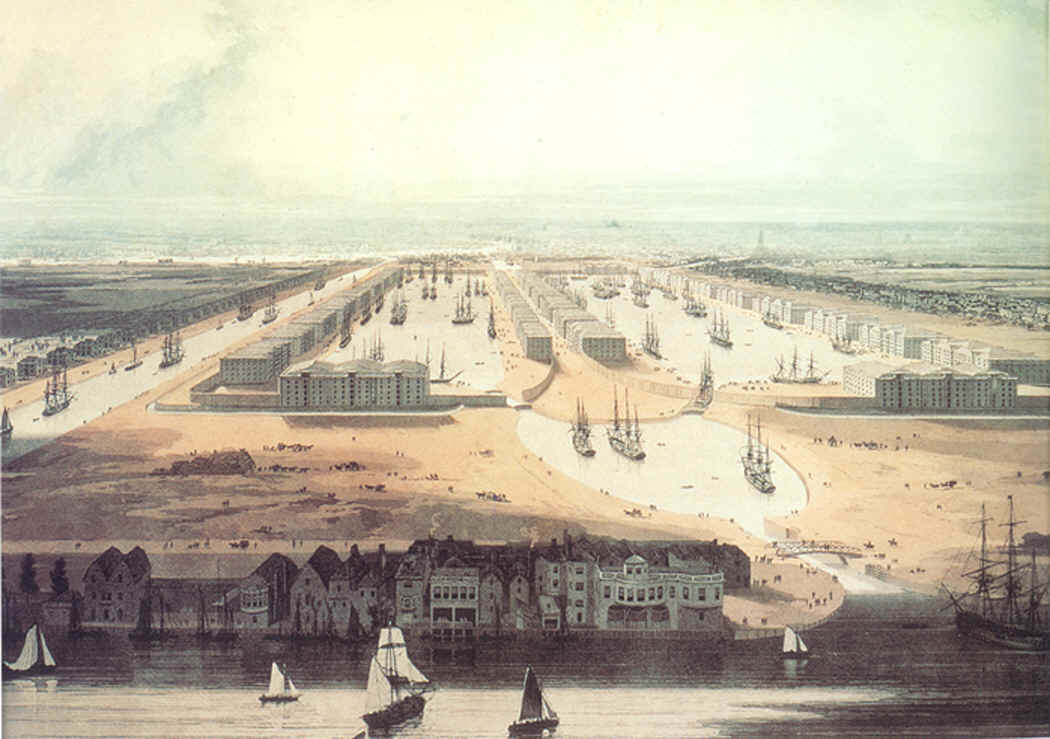
A painting of the West India Docks completed in 1802. London's large port made it into global the epicenter of maritime trade.

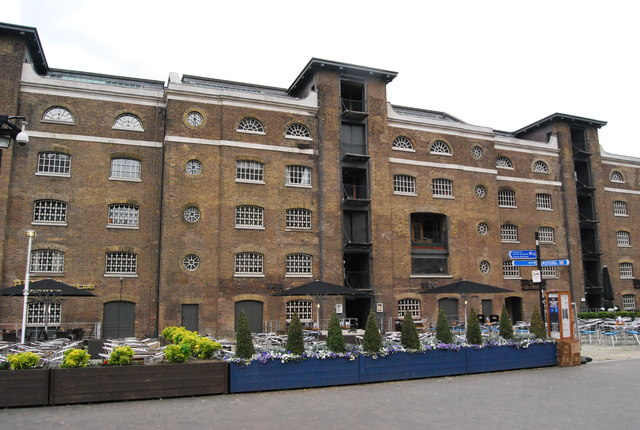
Former sugar warehouses in the West India Docks (1803) Isle of Dogs, some of the oldest dockland buildings surviving in London.

A significant development for the future development of London which occurred in the 18th century was the construction of multiple new bridges across the River Thames: the first bridges built in London since the 13th century. The first of which was Westminster Bridge, completed in 1738. A bridge at Westminster was first proposed in 1664, but was opposed by the Corporation of London and the watermen, fearing the bridge would compromise their monopoly on river crossings. This persisted until finally in 1724 the bridge was given parliamentary approval. This was followed by Blackfriars Bridge (1769), Kew Bridge (1759), Battersea Bridge (1773), and Richmond Bridge (1777) by which date roads and vehicles were improved and fewer regular goods were transported by water. All were built in a neoclassical style, with only original survivor being Richmond Bridge. These bridges greatly encouraged development south of the river in areas such as Southwark.

Meanwhile, in the far east of London the first enclosed docks were built on the Thames, most notably the East India Docks (1802) and West India Docks (1803). This greatly increased London's capacity and potential as a port, a direct result of the dramatic accent of Britain's Empire in the 18th century and the lucrative maritime trade of products from the colonies such as coffee, sugar and tea. Revenues from the slave trade were also an important part of London's maritime economy in this period. This accelerated broader urban development in adjacent areas such as Limehouse, Shadwell and Whitechapel, which still contain areas of Georgian residential buildings today. Some of the original dockland buildings on the East India Docks still survive, such as the former warehouses which now contain the London Museums Docklands (built in 1802) and the adjoining Ledger Building (1804), a single storey neoclassical office building with a small Doric portico.

== Regency (1811–1837) ==
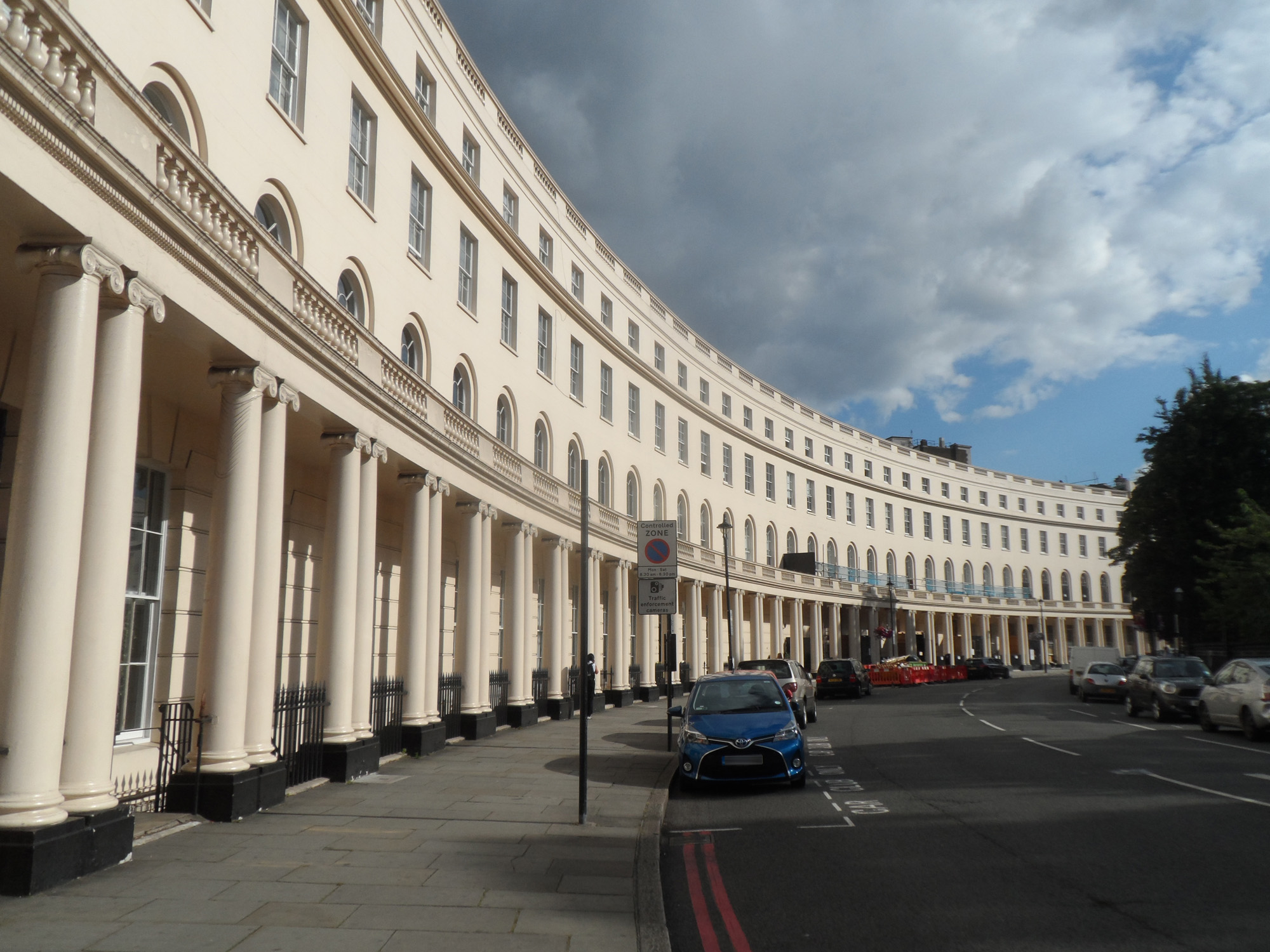
Park Crescent (1821) John Nash, a grand stucco Regency terrace

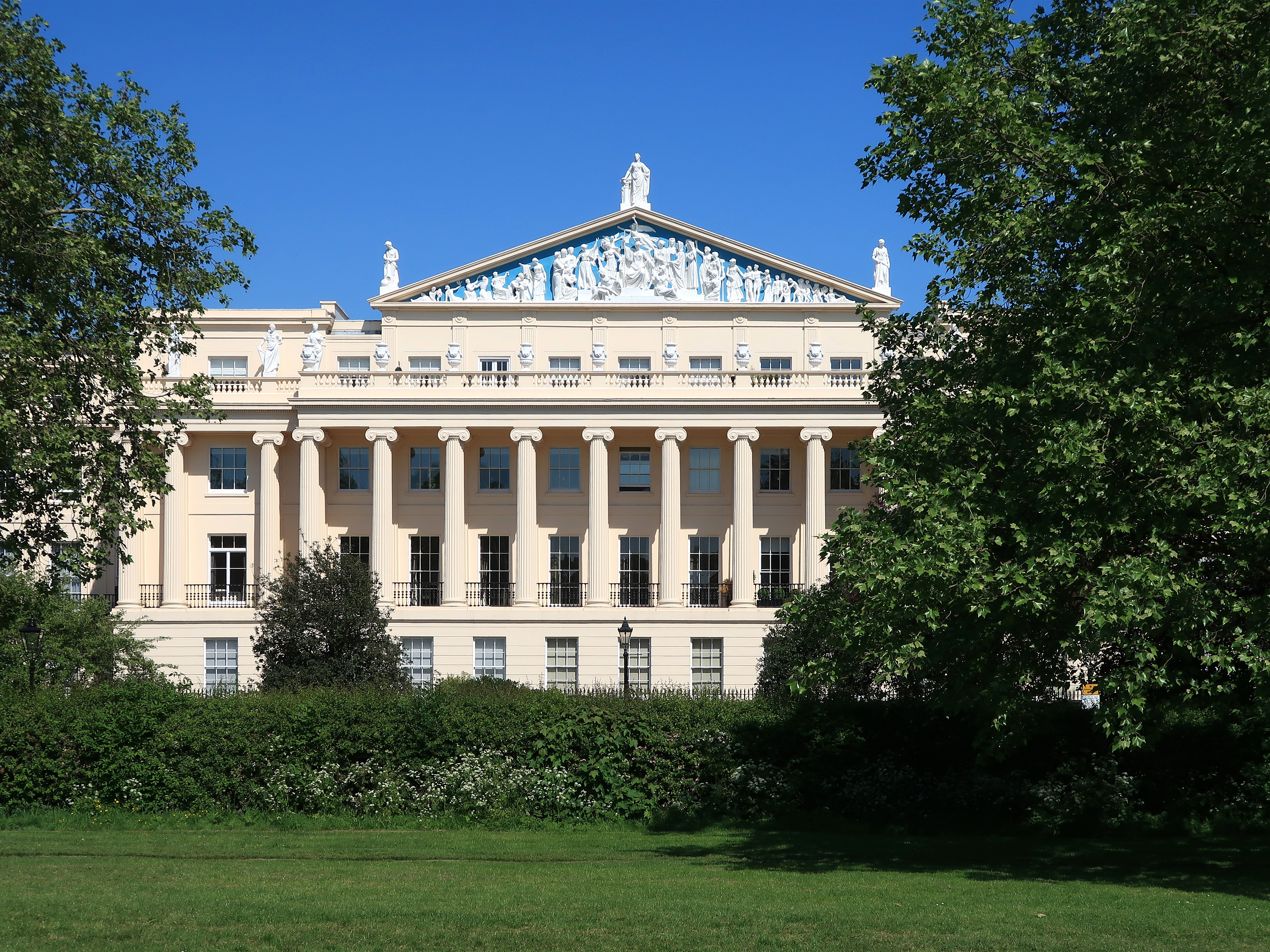
Cumberland Terrace (1826) John Nash, a grand terrace on Regent's Park with a Greek-inspired portico

London has some of the finest examples from the late-Georgian phase of British architecture known as Regency. This is aesthetically distinct from early Georgian architecture, though it continues the stylistic trend of Neoclassicism. Technically the Regency era only lasted from 1811 to 1820, when the Prince Regent ruled as proxy for his incapacitated father George III, but the distinctive trends in art and architecture extended roughly into the first 40 years of the 19th century. Regency is above all a stringent form of Classicism, directly referencing Graeco-Roman architecture. Regency employed enhanced ornamentation like friezes with high and low relief figural or vegetative motifs, statuary, urns, and porticos, all the while keeping the clean lines and symmetry of early Georgian architecture. Typically Georgian features like sash windows were retained, along with first-floor balconies, which became especially popular in the Regency period, with either delicate cast iron scrollwork or traditional balusters. The most noticeable difference between early Georgian and Regency architecture is the covering of previously exposed brick façades with stucco painted in cream tones to imitate marble or natural stone. John Nash was the leading proponent of Regency Classicism, and some of his finest works survive in London. These include the grand residential terraces surrounding Regent's Park: Cumberland Terrace, Cambridge Terrace, Park Square, and Park Crescent. Nash's heavy use of stucco on these buildings was often deceptive, as it could serve to obscure inferior-quality construction: Nash had a financial interest in the Regent's Park developments.

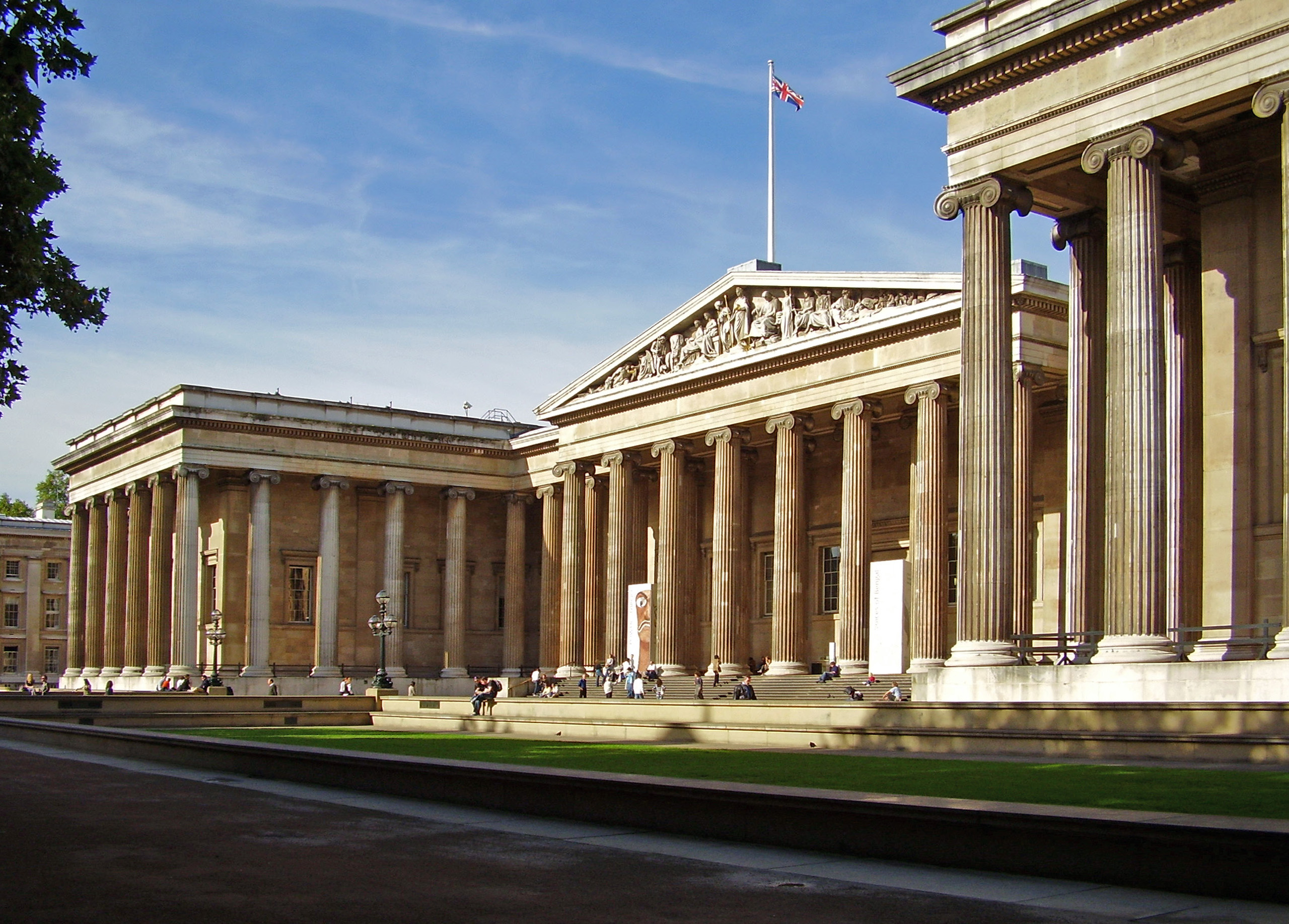
The British Museum (1827) by Robert Smirke, the archetypal Greek Revival building in London

The designs for the other Regent's Park terraces (Cornwall, Clarence and York) were entrusted to Decimus Burton, an architect who specialised in Greek Revival. These terraces employ all the signature features of Regency Classicism: imposing, temple-like frontages covered in gleaming stucco with projecting porches, porticos with Corinthian or Ionic capitals, large pediments, and figural friezes extending along the upper part of the façades. Burton's design for the Athenaeum Club (1830) on Pall Mall, whose sculptural frieze was modelled on the recently acquired Elgin Marbles in the British Museum, is another splendid example. Close to the Athenaeum, Nash designed what has been called "London's finest Regency terrace", Carlton House Terrace (1829), on the site of Carlton House. It had been demolished in 1826 after the new King, George IV, moved to Buckingham Palace, and Nash was employed to design the three-house terrace in his signature, rigidly Classical style: clad in stucco, with an imposing Corinthian portico, balconies, pediments, and Attic parapet, over a podium with squat Doric columns.

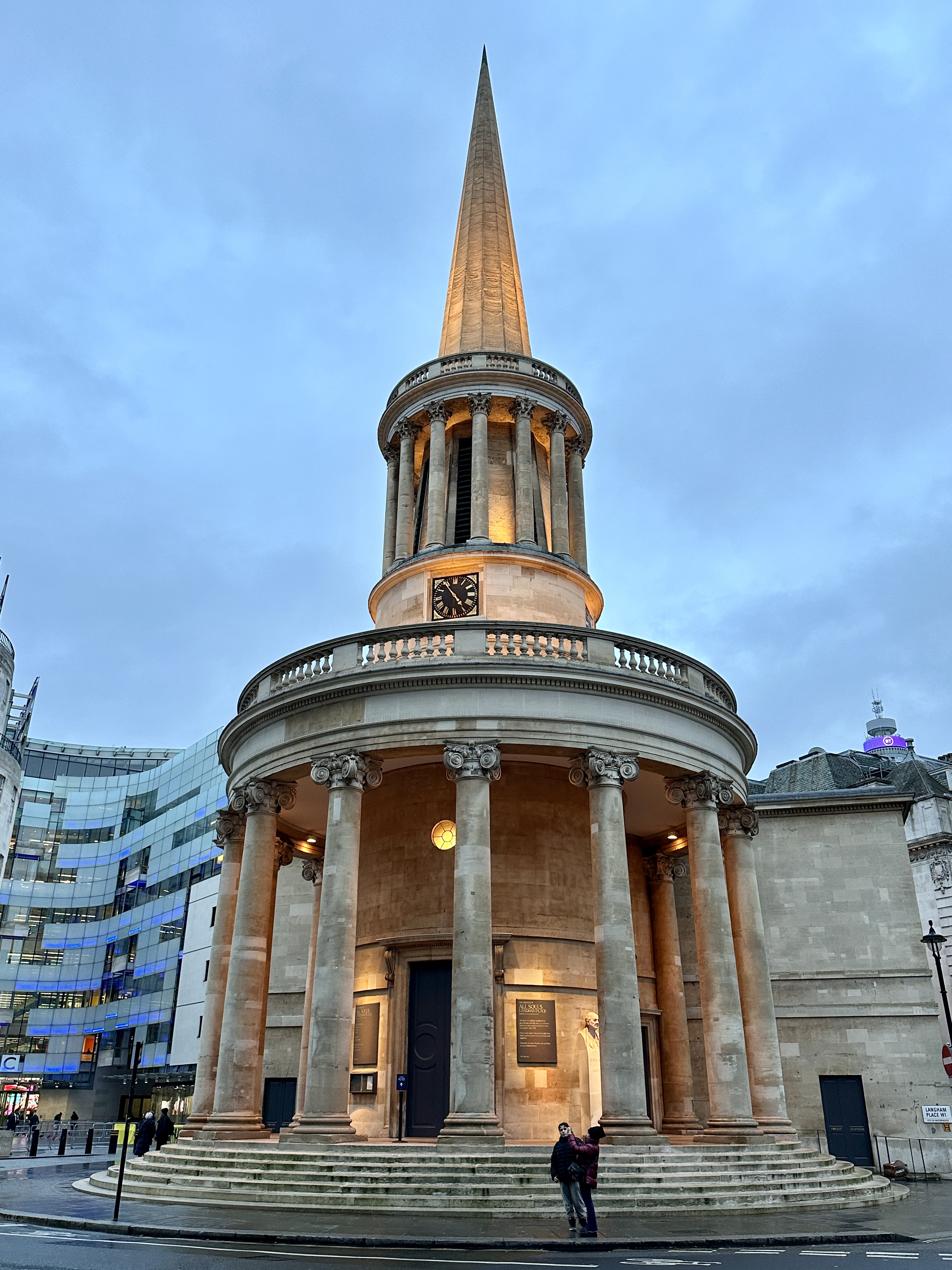
All Souls Church by John Nash (1824). This was intended as a major visual focal point of Regency Street, which compensated for an un-intended bend in the road.

Nash's most defining association was with the Prince Regent, his greatest patron. The most enduring legacy of this relationship is Buckingham Palace, which was transformed from the modest Buckingham House of George III's reign into a grand Neoclassical palace to Nash's designs. Beginning in 1825, Nash extended the house westwards and added two flanking wings, creating an open forecourt, or Cour d'honneur, facing St. James's Park. The style is similar to Nash's terraces on the edges of Regents Park, except that the Palace was built in golden-hued Bath stone instead of stucco-faced brick. The front façade of the main block features a two-storey porch of Doric columns on the bottom, tall fluted Corinthian columns above, with a pediment topped by statuary and adorned in high-relief sculpture. All the hallmarks of Regency Neoclassicism appear, including an encompassing frieze with vegetative scrollwork of Coade stone, balconies accessible from the first floor, and an attic with figural sculptures based on the Elgin Marbles. The west front overlooking the main garden features a bay window at its centre, with a long terrace with balustrades and large Classical urns made of Coade stone. Preceding the forecourt was a monumental Roman arch, modelled on the Arc de Triomphe du Carrousel in Paris, which currently stands as the Marble Arch at the north-eastern corner of Hyde Park. The addition of the East Wing early in the reign of Queen Victoria enclosed the forecourt and created the frontage of Buckingham Palace known ever since, but the bulk of the Palace exterior remains from Nash's Regency additions, particularly the long garden front on the west side.

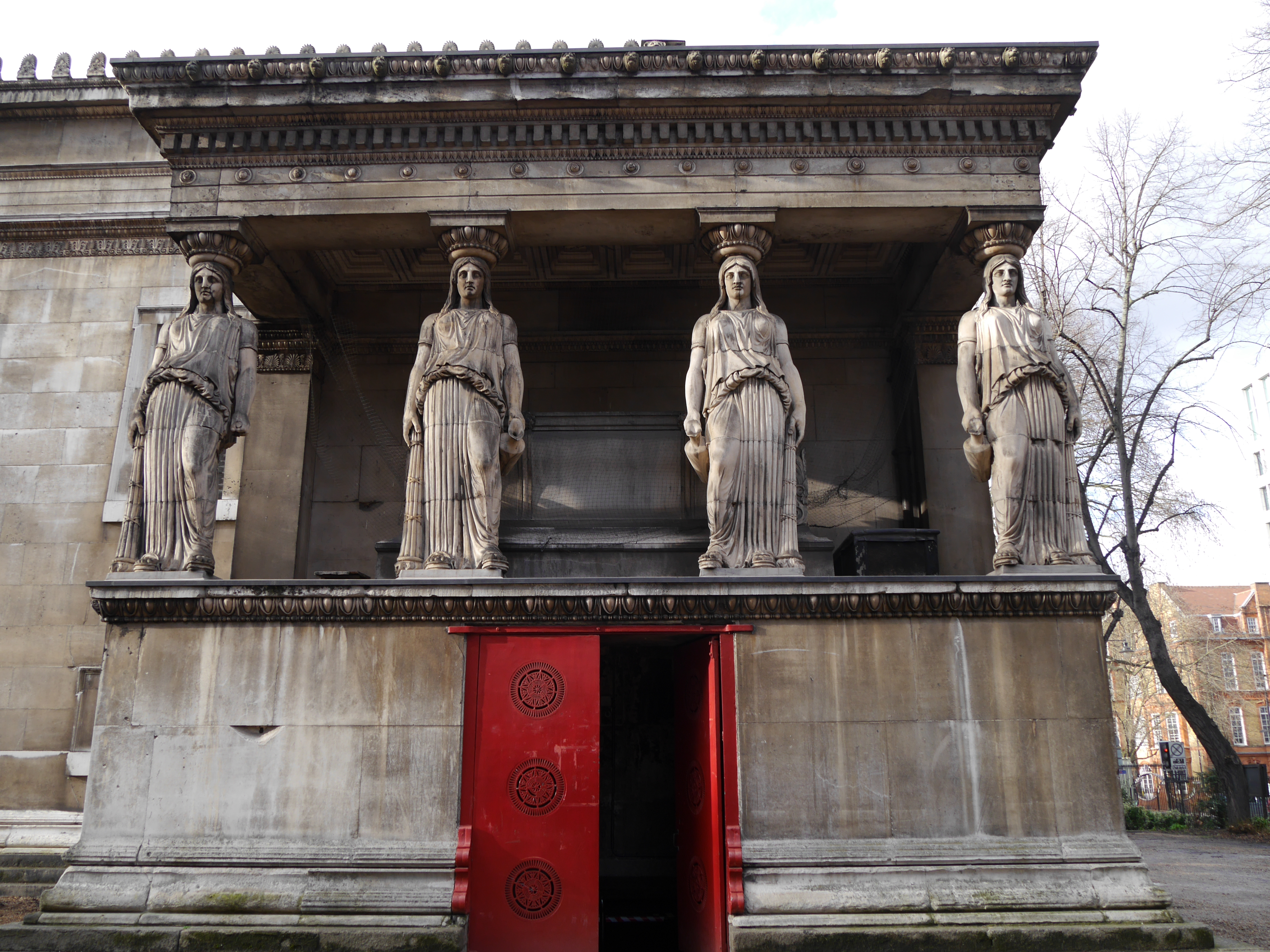
The Caryatid pillars of St Pancras New Church by William and Henry Inwood (1822)

Contemporaneous to Nash's building work in Regent's Park and St. James', the development of Belgravia further west offers the most uniform and extensive example of Regency architecture in London in the form of Belgrave Square, Eaton Square, Wilton Crescent and Chester Square. An ultra-exclusive housing development built on a formerly rural swathe of land on the Grosvenor Estate, building was entrusted to Thomas Cubitt and began in 1825 with Belgrave Square; the three main squares were completed and occupied by the 1840s. Like Nash, Cubitt designed elegant Classical terraces,. All were covered in white-painted stucco, with the entrance to each house featuring projecting Doric porches supporting first floor balconies with tall pedimented windows, and attics resting on cornice-work in the Greek manner.

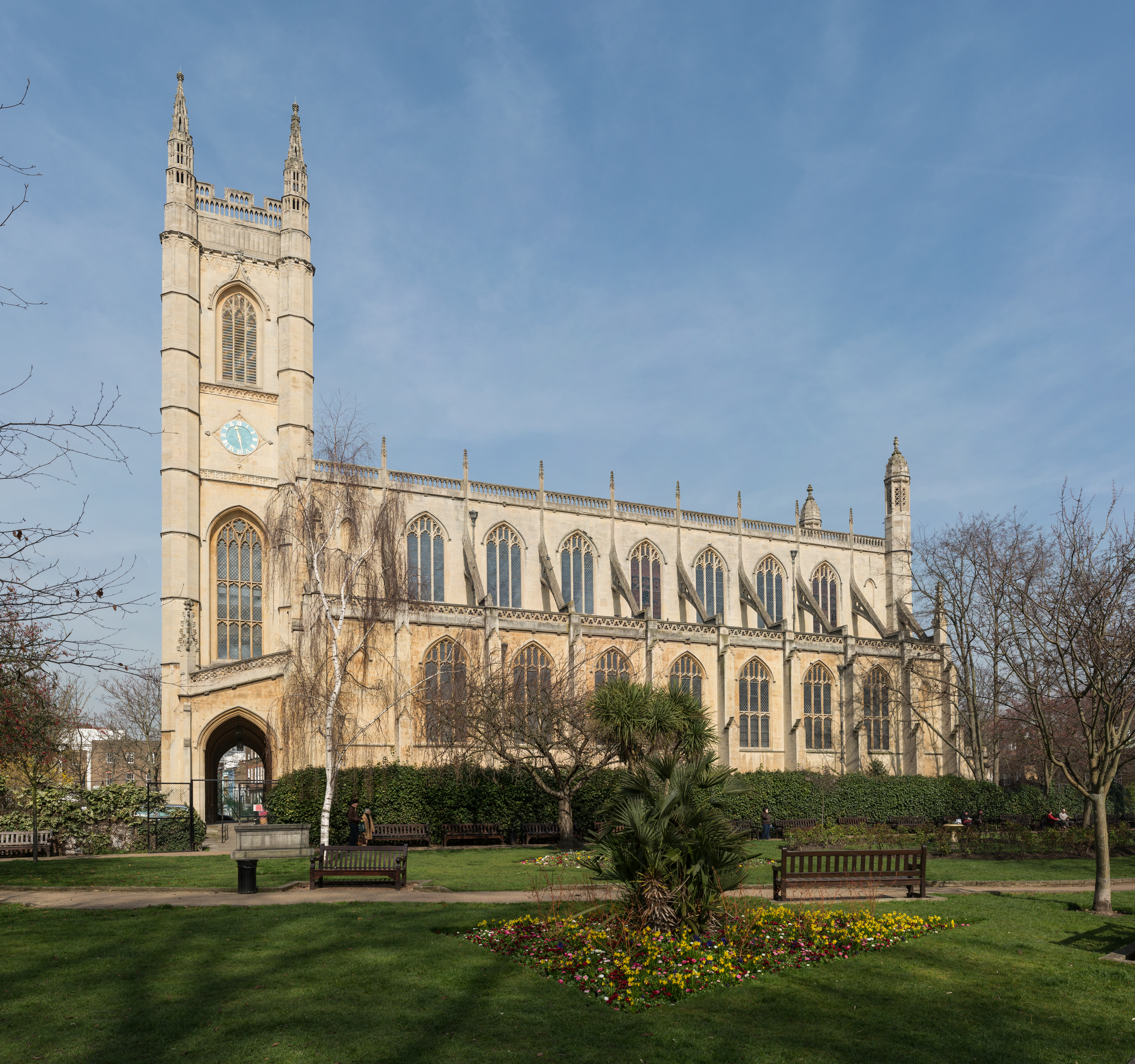
St Luke's Church Chelsea by James Savage (1824), one of the earliest Commissioner's Churches and a notably early example of Gothic-Revival architecture

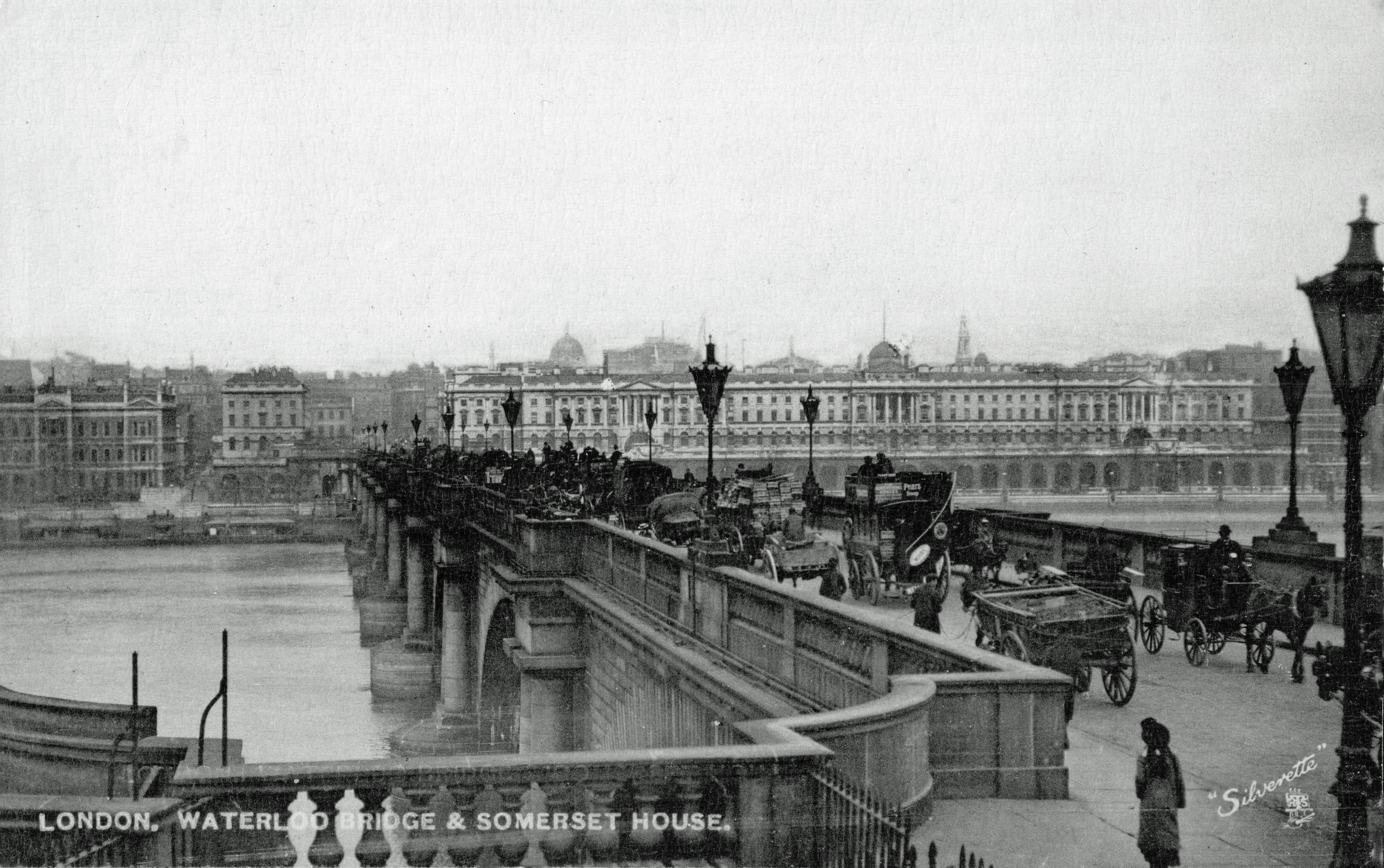
An image of Waterloo Bridge in 1907, a large Regency bridge built in Neoclassical style

The Regency period saw the construction of some of London's finest neoclassical churches, many of which are known as Commissioner's Churches. A Commissioners' church is an Anglican church built with money voted by Parliament via the Church Building Acts of 1818 and 1824. The 1818 Act supplied a grant of money and established the Church Building Commission to direct its use, and in 1824 made a further grant. The First Parliamentary Grant for churches amounted to £1 million (equivalent to £73,550,000 in 2019). The Second Parliamentary Grant of 1824 amounted to an additional £500,000 (£44,320,000 in 2019). Commissioner's churches in London include All Souls, Langham Place by John Nash: its circular tower was deliberately placed on a bend on Nash's Regents Street to create a picturesque view from Oxford Circus, the fine neoclassical St Mary's, Bryanston Square by Robert Smirke and St Luke's, Chelsea one of London's first Gothic-revival churches: an early indication of the shift away from neoclassicism that followed later in the 19th century. Other fine Regency churches include St Pancras New Church (1822) by William and Henry Inwood: one of the most authentic Greek-revival churches in London. In notably features a recreation of The Porch of the Maidens from the Erechtheion temple in Athens, illustrating the archaeological rigor of the practitioners of this revival style. Another notable church nearby is St Marylebone Parish Church (1819) by Thomas Hardwick, which is notable for its tower crowned with gilded angels.

The Regency era saw the construction of another three bridges over the Thames: Vauxhall Bridge, Waterloo Bridge and Southwark Bridge, all built in a classical style (all have been replaced). Two significant public buildings by William Watkins were built at the end of the Regency, the first being the UCL Main Building (1827) and then the National Gallery (1837). Both are similar in design, featuring a monumental Corinthian portico and a small cupola. The latter was very widely criticised after completion, with its limitations being largely a product of a lack of funding and planning complications rather than poor design.

== Victorian (1837−1901) ==
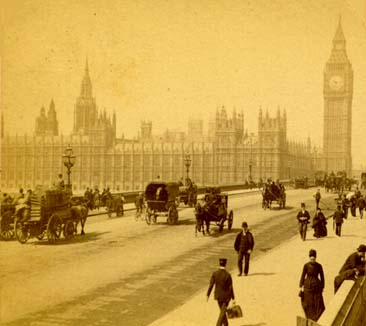
A 19th-century photograph of the Palace of Westminster by Charles Barry and Augustus Pugin (1840–60). This was arguably the archetypal Victorian building.

Buildings from the Victorian era (1837–1901) and their diverse range of forms and ornamentation are the single largest group from any architectural period in London. The Victorian era saw unprecedented urbanisation and growth in London, coinciding with Britain's ascendancy in the world economy and London's global pre-eminence as the first metropolis of the modern world. As the political centre of the world's largest Empire and the trading and financial hub of the Pax Britannica, London's architecture reflects the affluence of the period. The continuing numeracy of Victorian architecture throughout London is a reflection of the huge amount of building that occurred in the 19th century, which was largely a result of a massive growth in population from one million in 1801 to over five million in 1900.

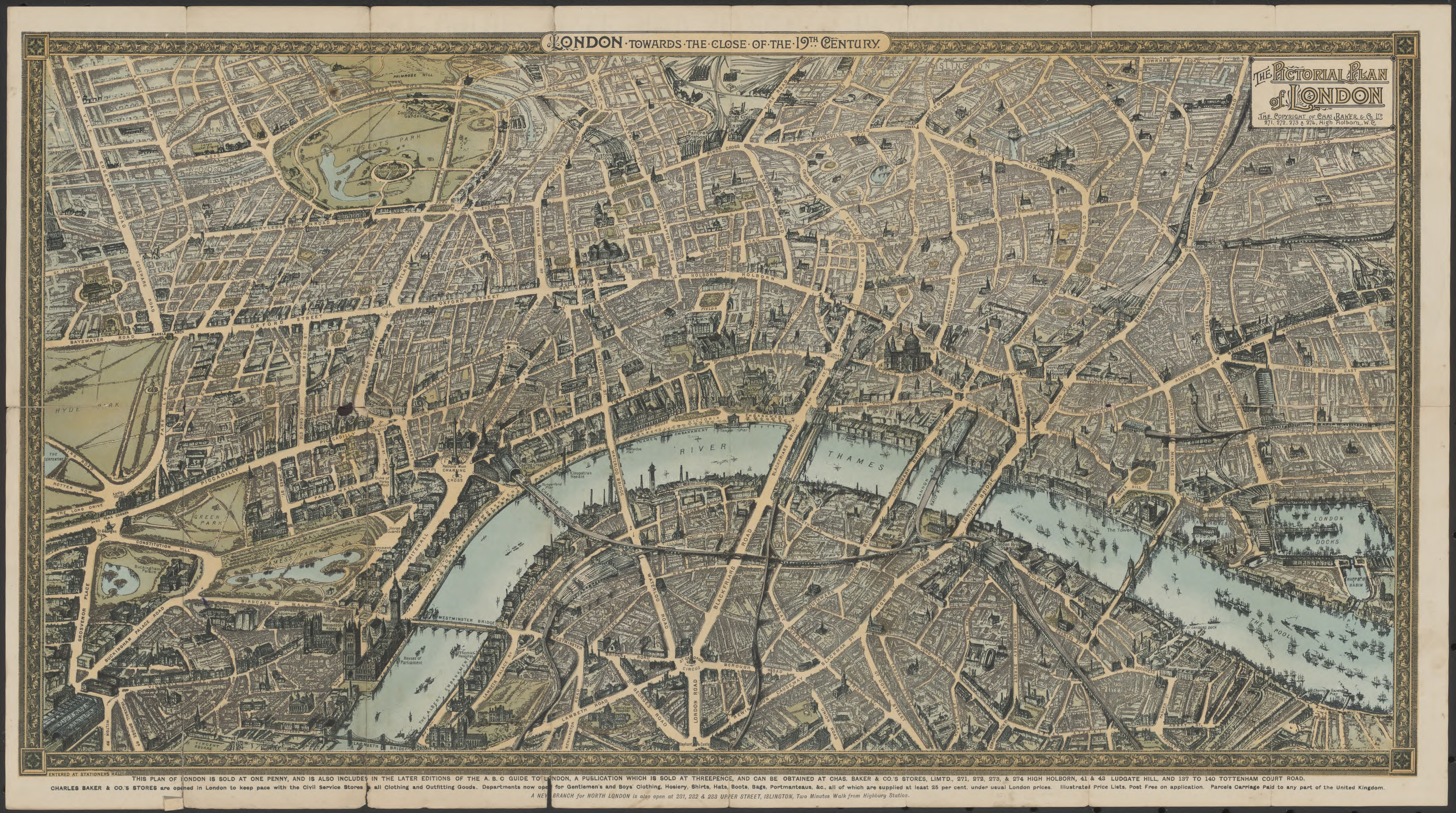
A map of London at the end of the 19th-century, illustrating the numerous railway termini and bridges present in the city center

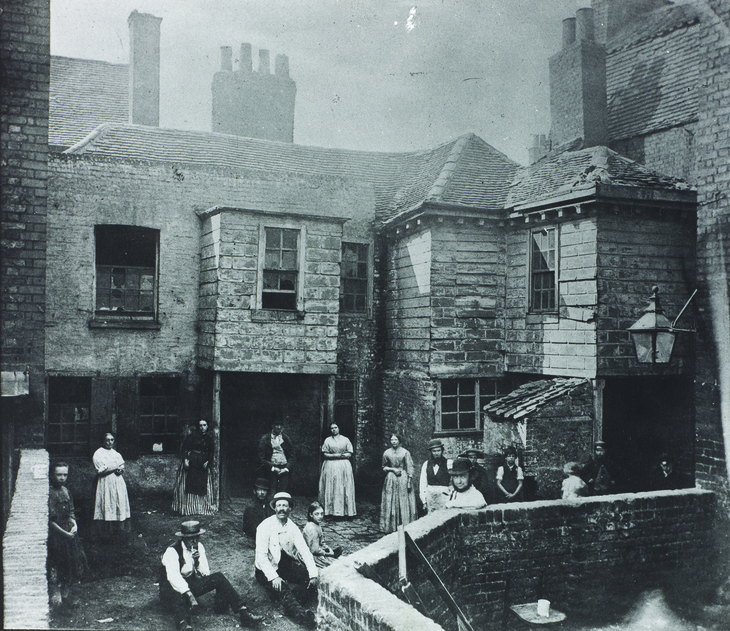
A slum in Kensington in the 1860s. Overcrowding and the exceptionally poor living conditions of the working classes presented new challenges for urban planning.

London also became the pre-eminent city of the Industrial Revolution in this period, with many new and highly innovative industrial building types and infrastructure being built in the city before anywhere else such as the world's first underground railways, large intercity railway termini, extensive sewage systems and coal-fired power stations. Stylistically this was a somewhat paradoxical period in London's architectural history, as on the one hand the Industrial Revolution created a variety of new possibilities in terms of materials and construction methods, as well as new building types, but on the other hand London's Victorian architecture was mostly highly historicist: attempting to recreate or re-invent a plethora of styles from the past. This tension between modernity and archaeology is one of the defining features of this period of London's built environment.

As London grew during the 19th century, the former compact, close proximity of different social classes in the City of London transformed into a taste for specially developed suburbs for specific classes of the population. This is reflected in styles of domestic and commercial architecture. Donald Olsen wrote in The Growth of Victorian London that "the shift from multi-purpose to single-purpose neighborhoods reflected the pervasive move towards professionalization and specialization in all aspects of nineteenth-century thought and activity." The growth of the suburbs and the increasing de-population of Central London as the 19th century progressed was largely made possible by the arrival of the railways, which enabled workers to live much further from their work places in the city center.

In contrast, while the middle classes moved to the suburbs, in Inner and East London rapid population growth, a lack of suitable housing, overcrowding and unsanitary conditions so severe that they lead to outbreaks of cholera, meant that living conditions in the working class districts of London were often dire. This presented substantial new urban planning challenges, which were counteracted by interventions such as the construction of the world's first modern sewage system, slum clearance and philanthropists like the Peabody Trust constructing affordable homes to improve working class living conditions.

=== Gothic Revival ===
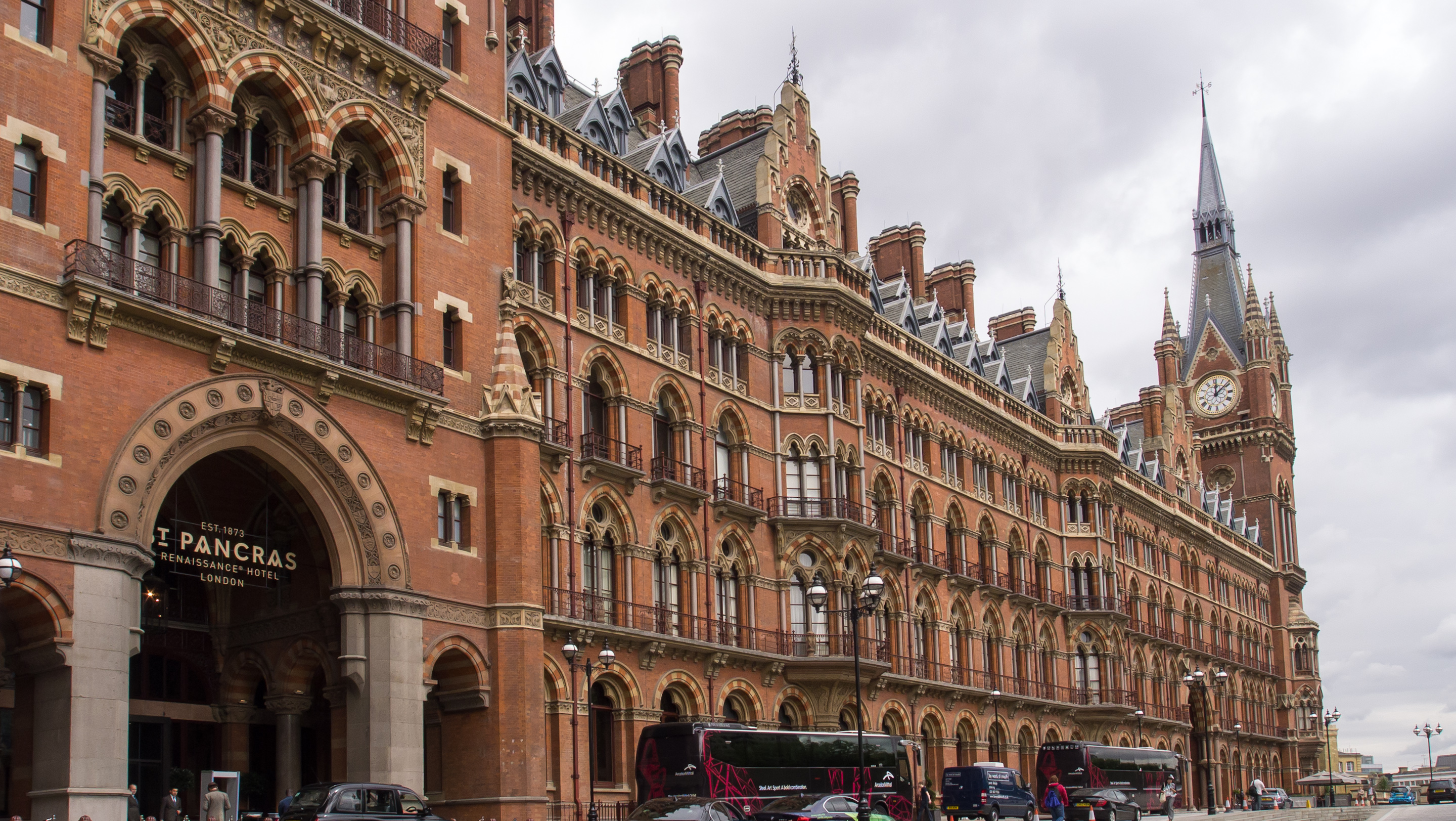
The Midland Grand Hotel at St. Pancras Railway Station (1868), one of London's finest Gothic-Revival buildings by the prolific architect George Gilbert Scott. While the likes of Pugin utilised English Gothic as their primary influence, this building references medieval commercial buildings of the Low Countries like Ypres Cloth Hall.

The style most strongly associated with the Victorian period is Gothic-Revival architecture, which utilised the Gothic architecture of the medieval period — such as the great English cathedrals of Lincoln and Salisbury — as its primary source of inspiration. Contrary to popular knowledge, even in the 18th century, when Classicism was dominant, a small number of buildings continued to be built in Gothic styles. Vanbrugh Castle (1719) by John Vanburgh, while not being purely Gothic, is an early example of the medievalism that would become prominent in the design of some Georgian houses. Nicholas Hawksmoor, one of the great architects of the English Baroque style, designed the twin towers of Westminster Abbey (1745) which in keeping with the medieval Gothic of the existing church. The most famous example of Georgian Gothic is Strawberry Hill House (1753), which blended Gothic and Rococo to produce a building described by Dan Cruickshank as "a mock medieval asymmetrical fantasy." Far more authentic attempts at recreating genuine medieval gothic appeared in the Regency period with churches such as St Luke's Church Chelsea (1824).

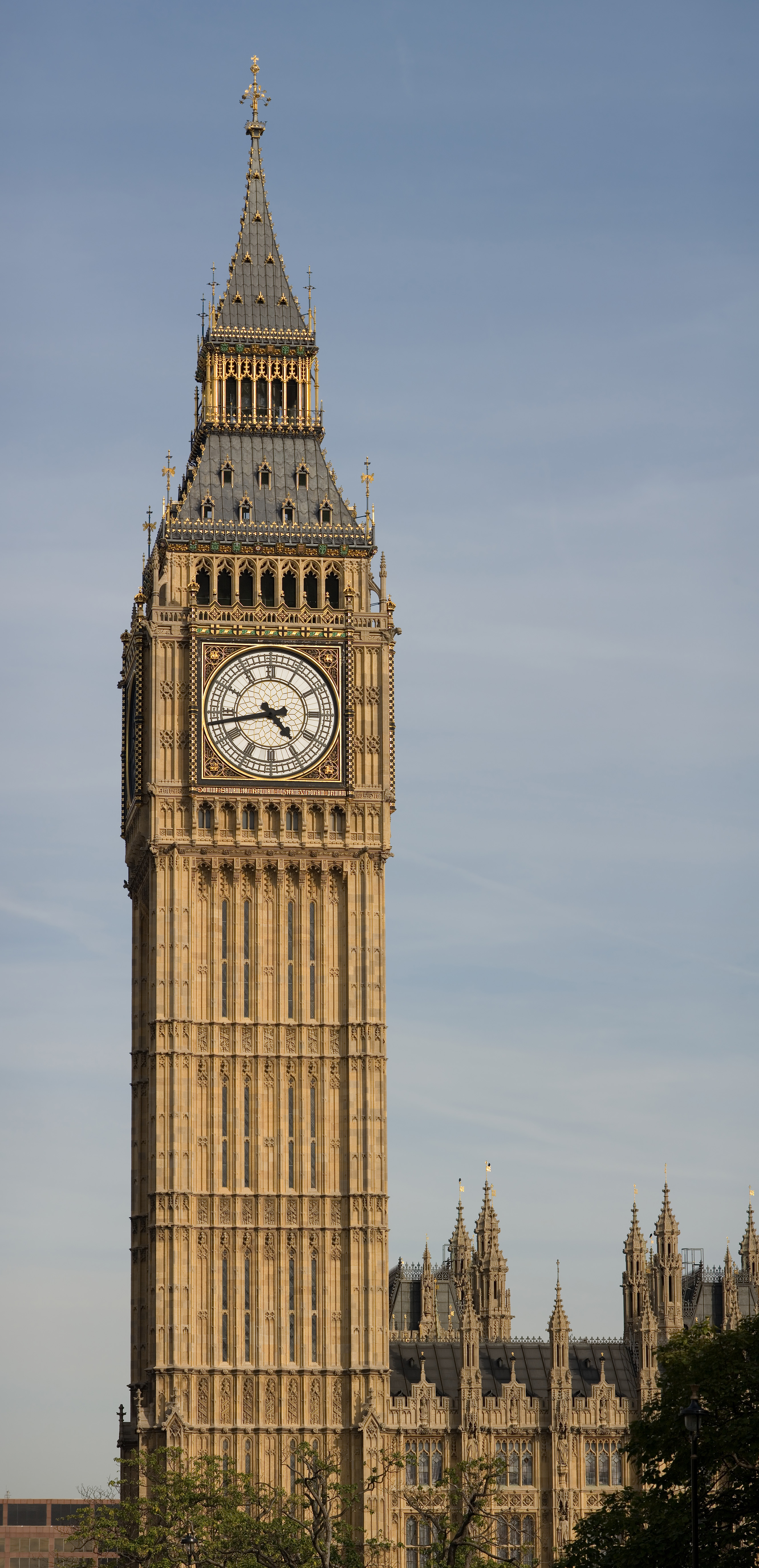
The Elizabeth Tower (Big Ben), Palace of Westminster, (1860) by Augustus Pugin

This new wave of enthusiasm for gothic architecture in the early Victorian period had a largely ethical and religious basis. The first source of this moralism was a product of two developments in Victorian Christianity: firstly the rise of the High church movement in Anglicanism and the increasing tolerance of Roman Catholics in Victorian England, both of which sought to create a sense of continuity between themselves and pre-reformation English Christianity with which gothic architecture is associated. The second source of this moralism was a product of the Romantic movement, a movement in the arts and culture which regarded the Enlightenment (which in architecture was associated by many with Neoclassicism and in politics with the French Revolution) and the Industrial Revolution as eroding the authenticity, morality and true identity of European culture, with the Middle Ages representing a more authentic and virtuous age to be replicated. This acted as motive to reference not only to reference Gothic tyle, but also other pre-neoclassical styles, as well as use decorative motifs influenced by nature.

The individual that embodied both of these moral arguments in favour of Gothic-revival architecture was Augustus Pugin, a highly influential architect, interior designer and critic who in many ways set the tone for the Victorian Gothic revival more than any other individual. This was largely due to publishing a series of volumes of architectural drawings between 1821 and 1838 that were to remain as standard references for Gothic Revivalists for at least the next century. Pugin was a convert to Catholicism who wrote several influential books espousing his admiration of gothic architecture and urging its revival. He went on to design many ornate catholic churches across the country, whose highly decorative interiors were an idealistic attempt to recreate England's churches prior to the Reformation. An example of a Pugin church in London is St George's Cathedral, Southwark (1840).

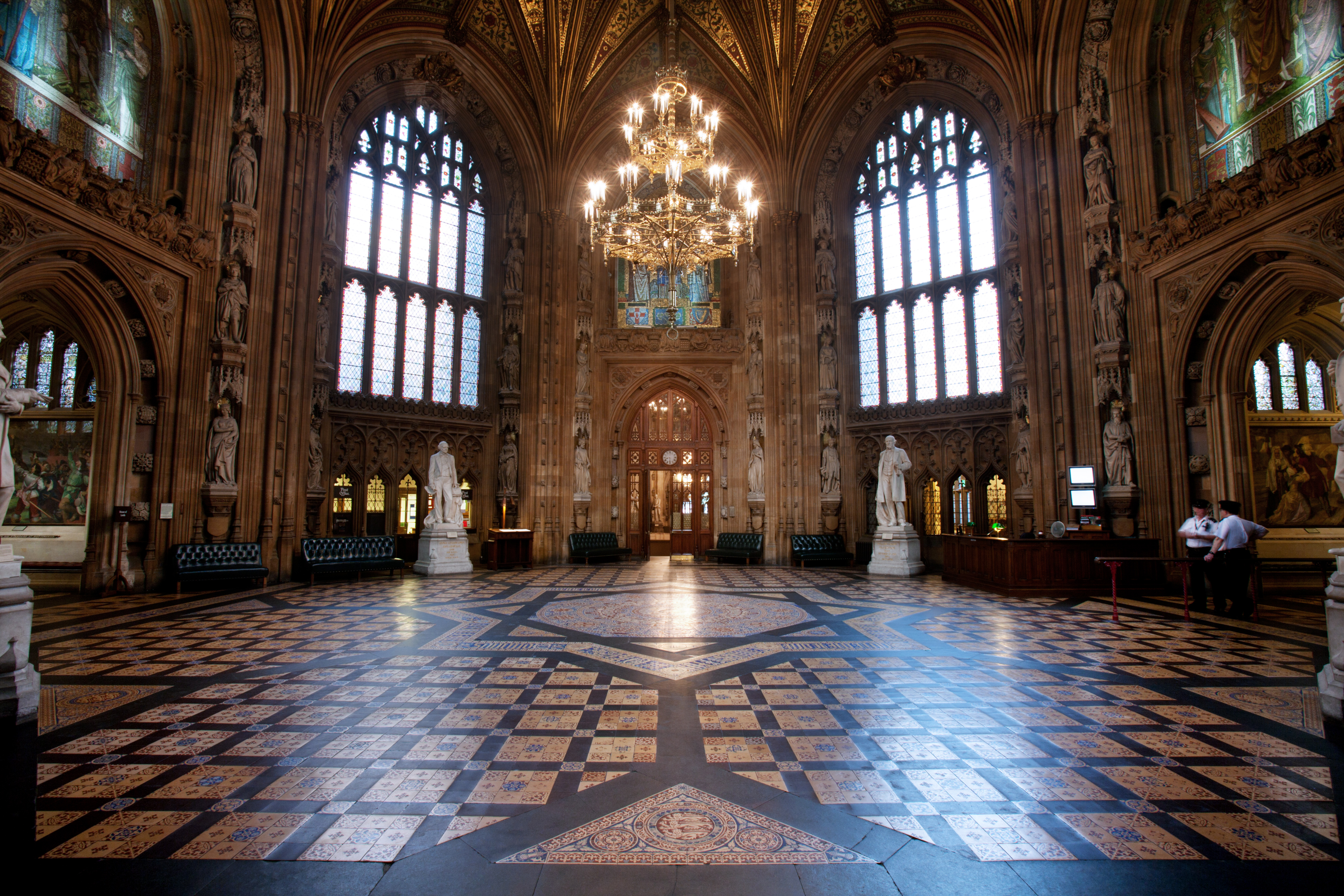
The central lobby of the Palace of Westminster (1860) by Augustus Pugin, showing a strong Perpendicular influence

By far Pugin's most significant work in London that is arguably the most famous building of the entire Victorian era is The Palace of Westminster (1840–60), which he worked on alongside the classical architect Charles Barry. The original building was a varied collection of medieval and Georgian structures which burnt down in 1834, with the exception of Westminster Hall which survived. Barry came up with the overall plan of this highly complex building, while Pugin decorated the interior and exterior with gothic ornamentation which was heavily influenced by English Perpendicular Gothic, associated with buildings such as Gloucester Cathedral. He also designed the iconic clocktower Big Ben (The Elizabeth Tower). Despite being very positively received upon completion, Pugin was not satisfied with the finished building because he did not consider it to be truly Gothic, instead considering it as simply a Classical building with Gothic ornamentation, being quoted as saying: "All Grecian, Sir; Tudor details on a classic body."

All Saints, Margaret Street (1859) by William Butterfield, one of the most ornate Gothic Revival churches in London.

Many new churches were constructed in ornate Gothic Revival designs in reference to the ideals of Pugin and to re create the vibrant interiors of pre-reformation churches. The finest of these include All Saints church in Fitzrovia, the French-Gothic St Augustine's, Kilburn designed by John Loughborough Pearson (founded 1870), St Mary Magdalene, Paddington, and St Cuthbert's, Earls Court, designed by Hugh Roumieu Gough and built between 1884 and 1887. St. Cuthbert's, according to English Heritage, has "one of the most lavish and consistent [interior] schemes in any Victorian church" and is "one of the richest ecclesiastical interiors in London." Modelled in its proportions after Tintern Abbey, and packed with decoration in marble, stone, wrought iron, and oak, the masterpiece of St. Cuthbert's is the 50-foot-high (15 m) wooden reredos carved in an elaborate late-Gothic Spanish style.

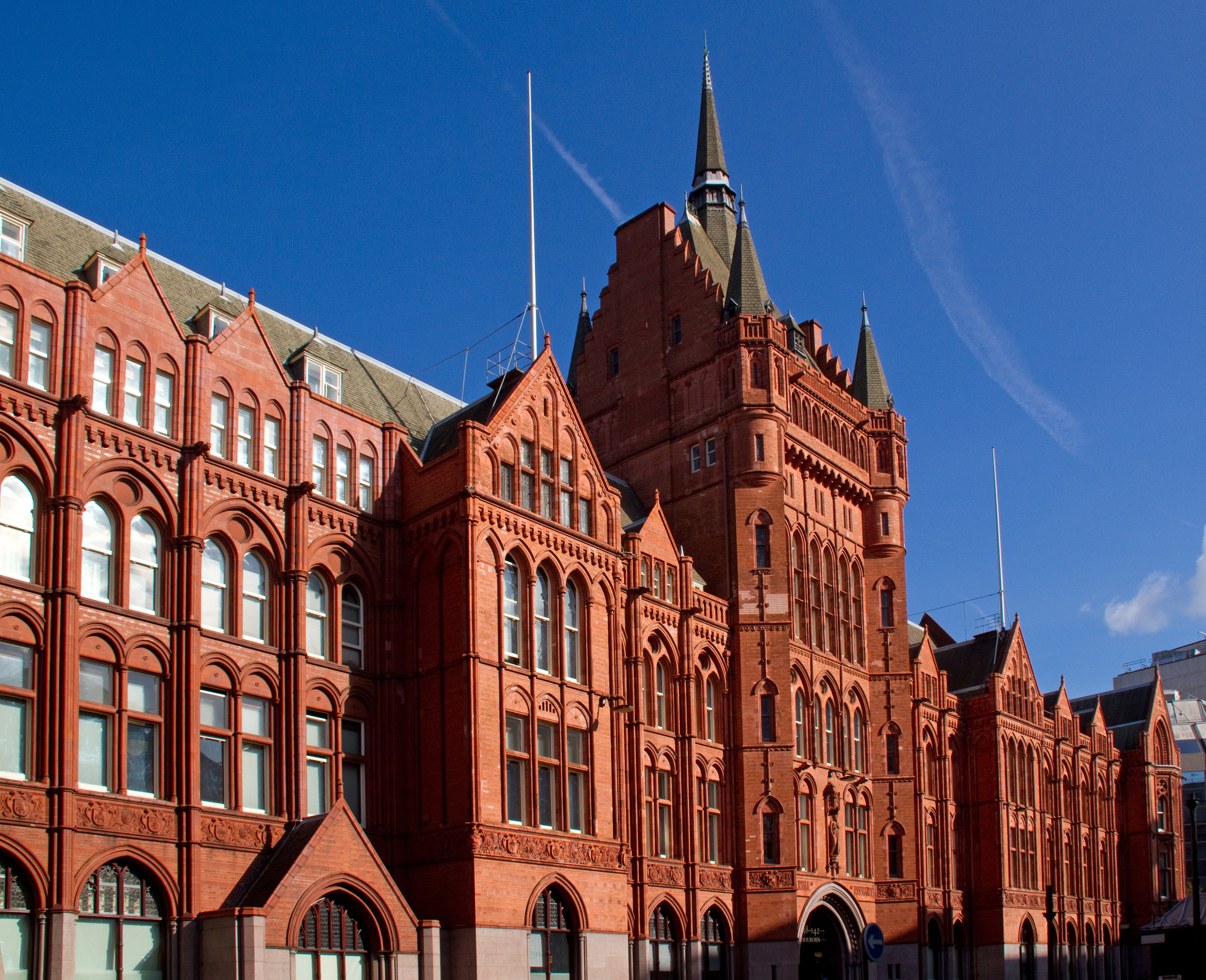
Holborn Bars (1876–1901), an example of Gothic-Revival in a large commercial building

Gothic-revival architecture optimises the somewhat contradictory combination of cutting-edge construction methods and replication of historic styles that was often present in Victorian architecture. This can be seen in the widespread use of cast iron, and from the mid-19th century mild steel, which were used in Gothic revival iron structures like Blackfriars Bridge (1869) and St Pancras railway station (1868). Other significant buildings built in Gothic Revival are the Royal Courts of Justice (1882), the Midland Grand Hotel (1876) adjoining St Pancras station, Liverpool Street railway station (1875), and the Albert Memorial (1872) in Kensington Gardens. Even the suburbs were built in derivative Gothic Revival styles, sometimes called "Wimbledon Gothic". With the exception of late-Victorian examples such as Holborn Bars (1876–1901) the Gothic-Revival style was not emphatically embraced in London's commercial architecture, with most banks and offices in the City of London continuing to be built in neoclassical styles in the 19th century. An unusual use of High Victorian Gothic used in the design of a relatively small commercial building can be seen in 33-35 Eastcheap (1868), a vinegar warehouse that was described by Nicholaus Pevsner as "one of the maddest displays in London of Victorian Gothic".

=== Victorian Neoclassicism and Italianate ===
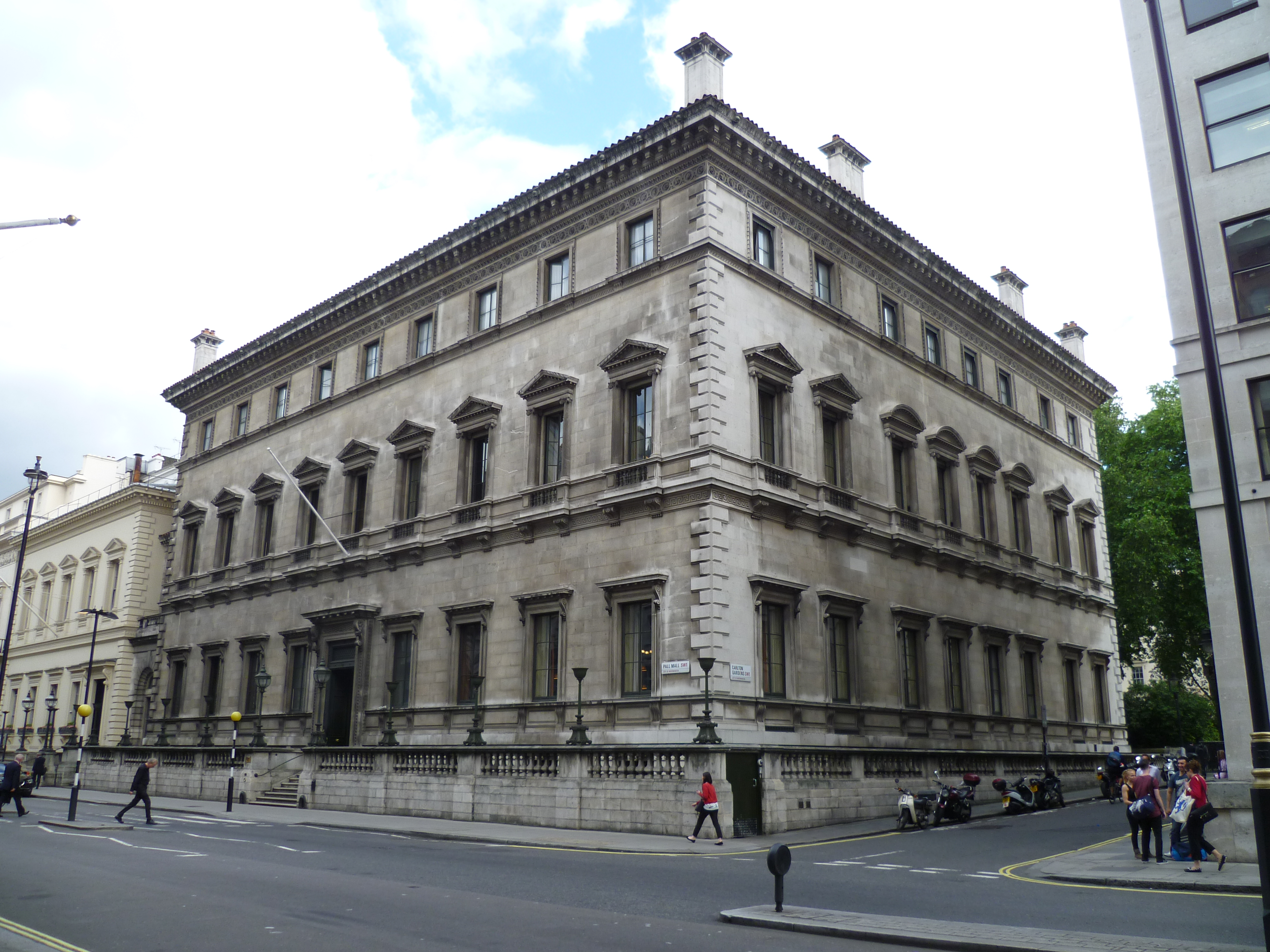
The Reform Club (1841) by Charles Barry: a highly influential Italianate design strongly referencing the Palazzo Farnese.

Contrary to the popular belief that the Gothic-Revival lead to Neoclassical architecture becoming unfashionable in the mid-19th century, classically influenced architecture did continue to persist in London throughout the Victorian period, albeit in a different style to that of the Palladianism which characterised most Georgian and Regency architecture. More specifically Neoclassicism persisted as a fashionable building style for particular building types, such as large commercial buildings like banks, private members clubs and certain types of public buildings such as educational institutes and museums. This was in contrast to other British cities like Manchester in which the Gothic-revival was the dominant style for such building types.

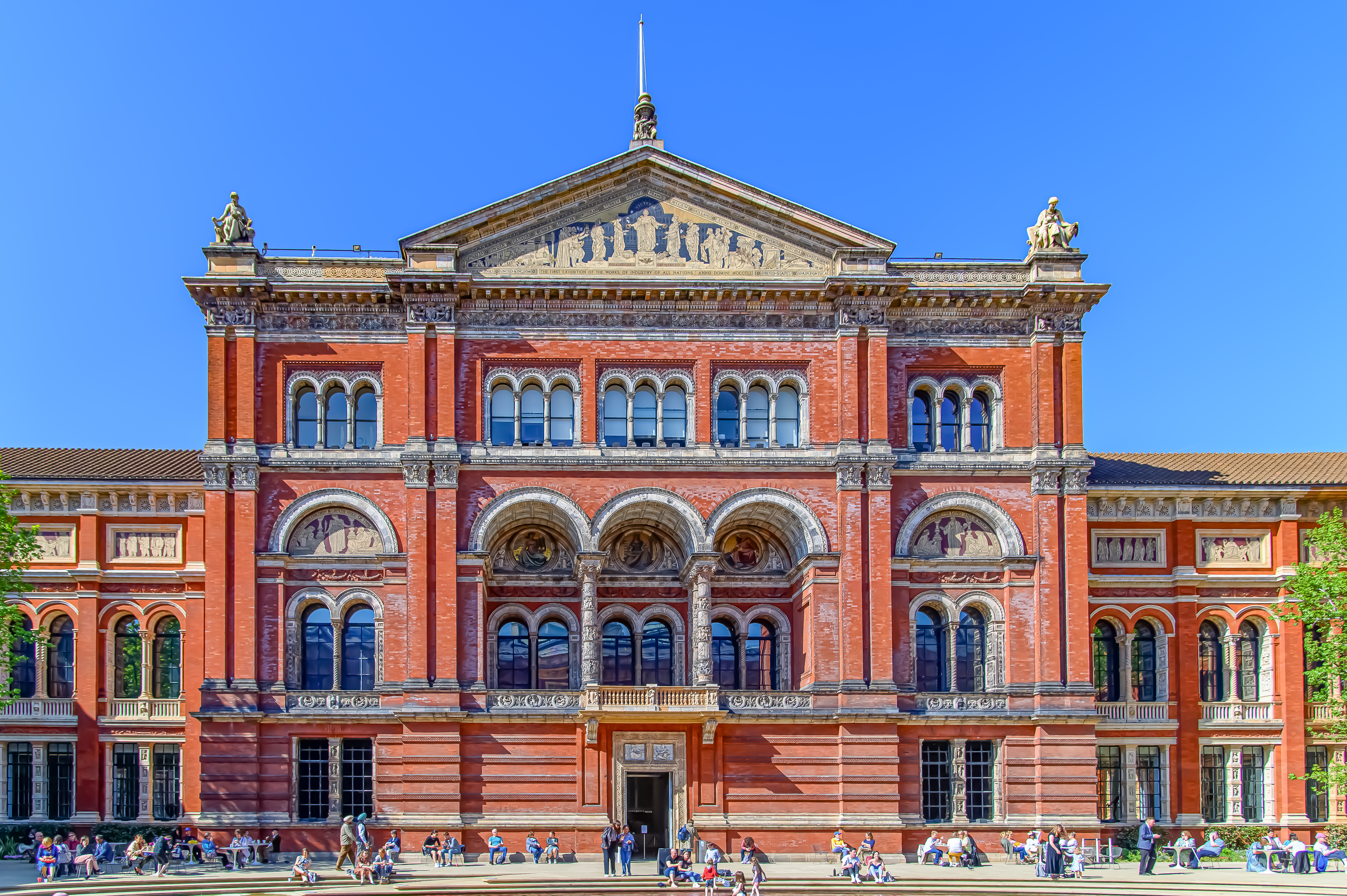
The central courtyard of the Victoria and Albert Museum (1854–69), an ornate Italianate design

The most prominent neoclassical trend in Victorian architecture was Italianate, which took strong influence from Italian renaissance architecture. A notable example in central London is the Reform Club (1841) by the famous classical architect Charles Barry, which was heavily influenced by the palazzos of Renaissance Italy such as The Palazzo Farnese and is one of the earliest examples of the style in Britain; it somewhat became a blueprint for the style. A far more ornate example is the central courtyard of the Victoria and Albert Museum (1854–69), which utilises red brick, friezes made of mosaics and terracotta on its exterior. This building illustrates the increasingly eclecticism and inventiveness of late Victorian architecture in general, as this building is not a faithful recreation of Italian Renaissance architecture by any means, rather it uses Italianate as a loose basis for a more eclectic design that makes use of a broader array of influences, materials and construction methods.

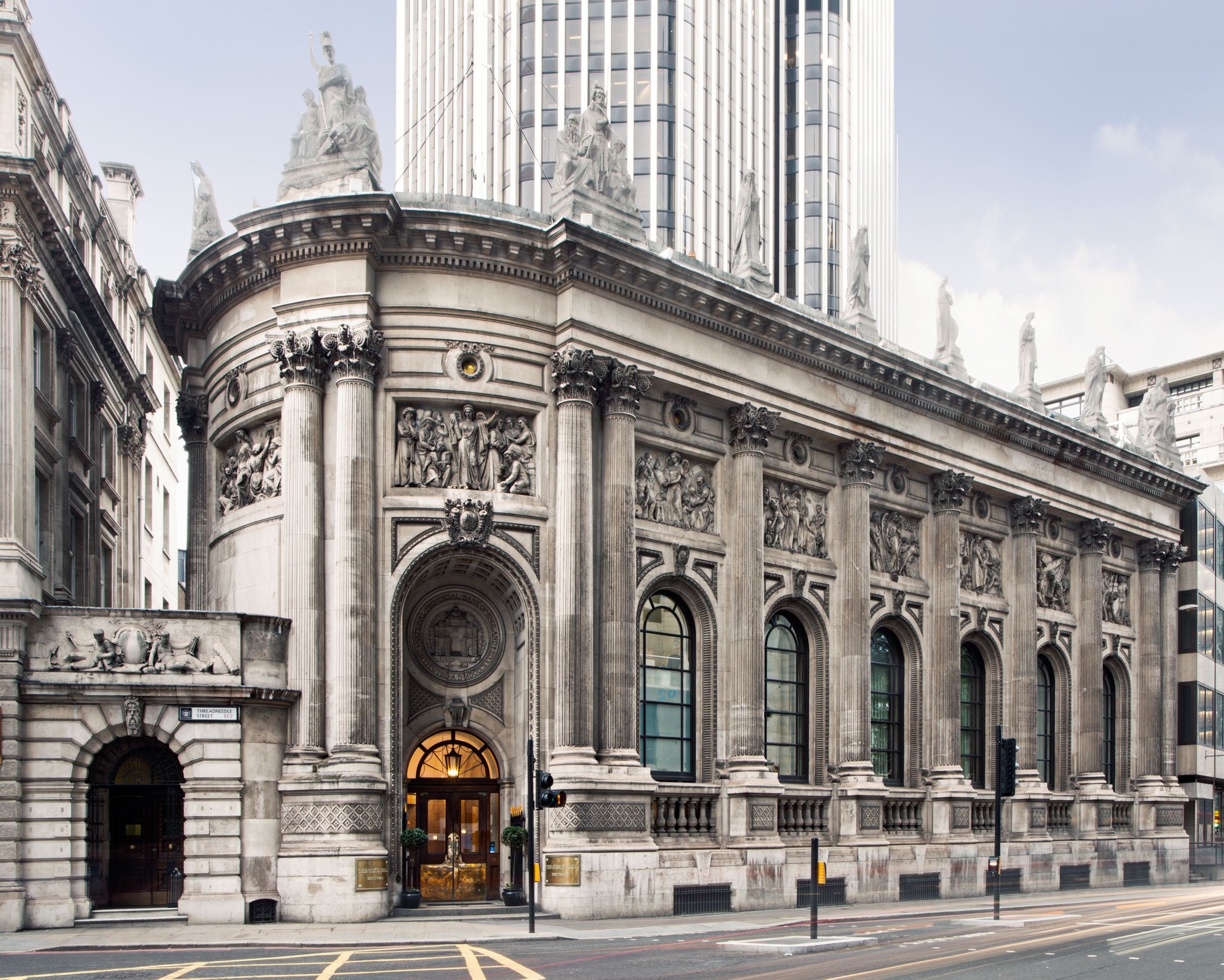
Gibson Hall (1867) a grand Neoclassical bank, demonstrating the persistence of the style

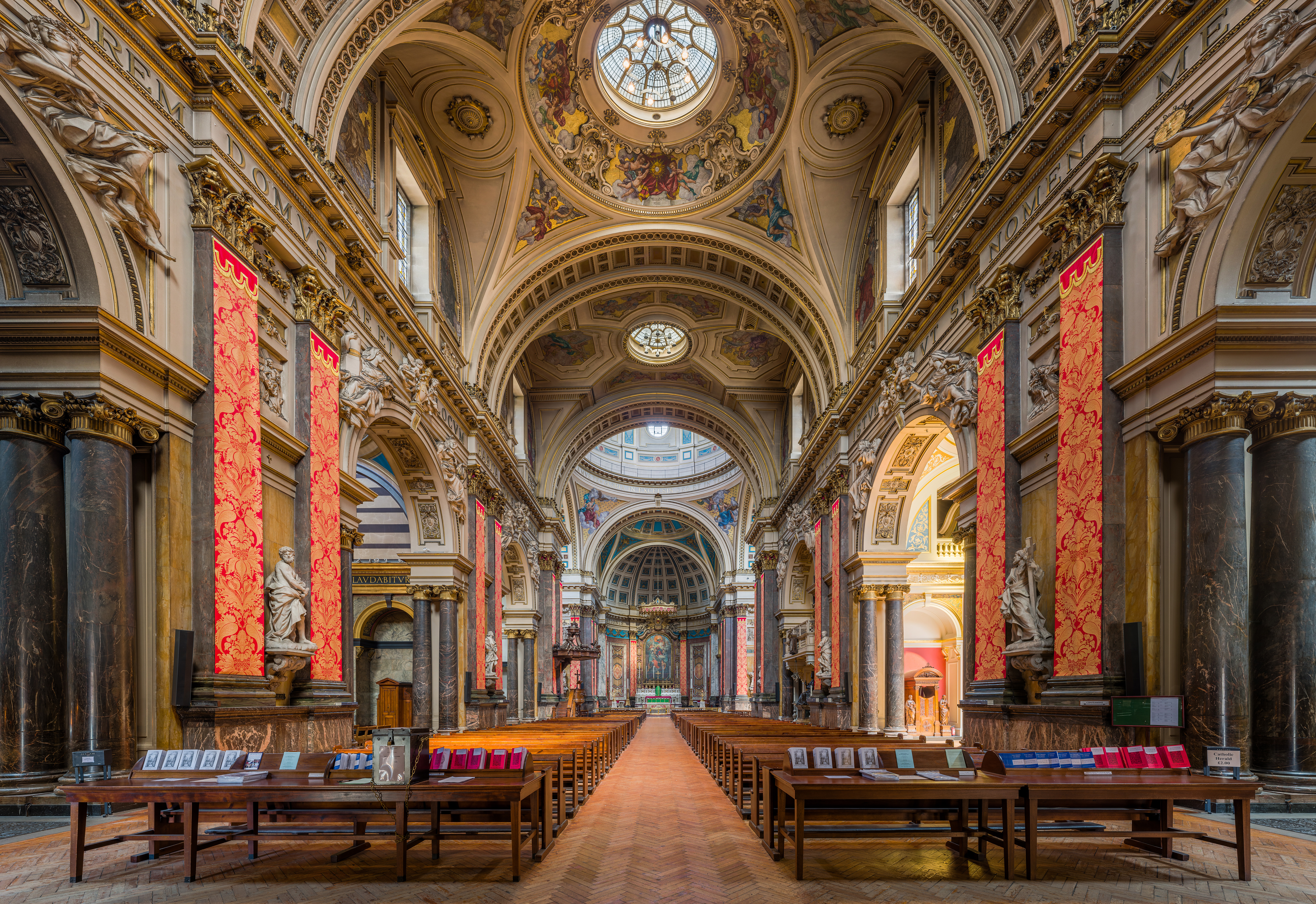
The interior of Brompton Oratory (1884), somewhat foreshadowing the Baroque-revival that became prominent in the Edwardian era

In commercial buildings, conventional Neoclassism that was more akin to that of the 18th-century than the renaissance revivalism of the Italianate style continued to persist for the design of large banks, offices and other commercial buildings in the City of London. The most famous example is the Royal Exchange (1844), which has a main façade consisting of a monumental Corinthian portico which replicates a Roman temple, a clock tower in an English Baroque style on the eastern side of the building and an ornate central courtyard with renaissance influences. A later example is Gibson Hall, Bishopsgate (1867) an opulent bank building which was described by Nicholas Pevsner as “the best bank in the Victorian City”. This was built in conventional 18th-century-style Neoclassicism, utilising a monumental Composite order, statues on the roof-line and decorative friezes on the outer walls.

Towards the end of the 19th-century, classicism still persisted but in a far more diluted manner which was mixed with an array of other influences. A prominent example of this is Leadenhall Market (1881), whose street facades are evocative of Dutch Baroque architecture, while the interior utilises vibrant colours and a glass ceiling with cast-iron frame in a manner which is loosely Classical in style, but has no historical precedence. This kind of Victorian eclecticism was superseded by conventional Neoclassicism once again in The Edwardian period with rise of the Edwardian Baroque and Neo-Georgian styles. A precursor to this can be seen in the City of London at James Edmundson's house + Harris & Sons (1887), a recreation of a grand early Georgian townhouse house with Baroque decorations which was utilised as office. An exceptionally grand and faithful recreation of the Italian Baroque style can be seen at Brompton Oratory (1884), a large catholic church complete with a dome and highly decorative interior. This foreshadows the grand scale of many neo-Baroque buildings that would be built in London in the Edwardian period.

=== Other Victorian styles ===
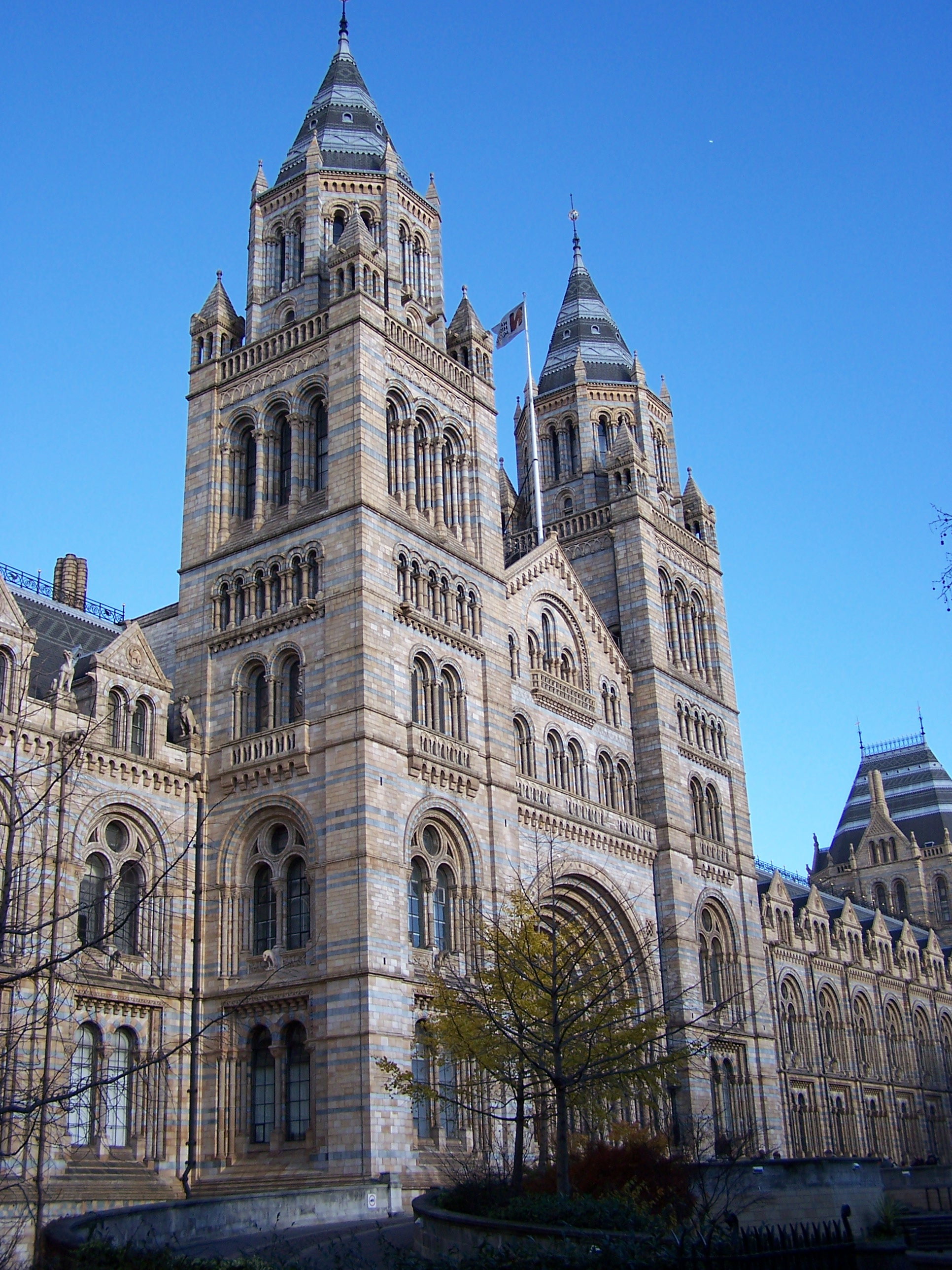
Natural History Museum (1881), the most prominent example of Romanesque Revival in London

Although Victorian architecture is most closely associated with the Gothic Revival and to a lesser extent the Italiante style, many other historicist styles were utilised in London's Victorian architecture particularly in the late 19th century, to the extent that no individual style was dominant. Other revival styles that were utilised in Victorian architecture in London include Byzantine Revival, Queen Anne Revival, Jacobethan, Renaissance Revival, Romanesque Revival and Tudor Revival. Some buildings built in such revival styles were genuine attempts at faithful re-creations of the original style by strongly referencing historic examples, such as the Tudor Revival Great Hall of Lincoln's Inn (1845) which utilises red brick and a hammerbeam roof in an attempt to replicate late Tudor halls such as Lambeth Palace and the Byzantine Revival Saint Sophia Cathedral (1882) which was inspired by Hagia Sophia, featuring a centralised dome and use of decorative mosaics on the interior.

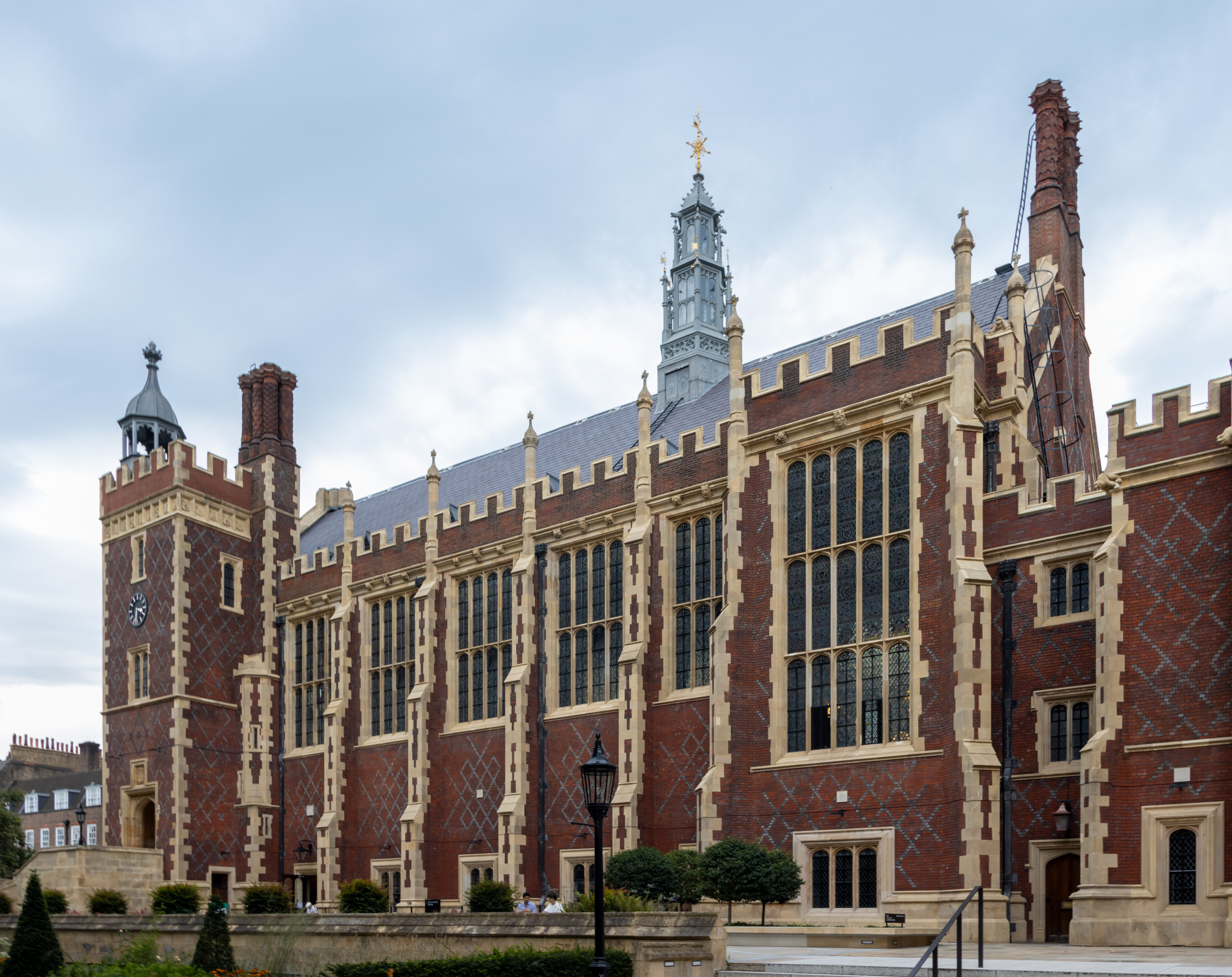
Great Hall, Lincoln's Inn (1845), a Neo-Tudor design that strongly references Lambeth Palace

In contrast, many Victorian buildings mixed a variety of these different historical influences in an eclectic manner that transcended stylistic category. An example of this eclecticism was the Imperial Institute (1888), a highly eclectic design which referenced Gothic, Renaissance, Tudor and Baroque architecture simultaneously; it was mostly demolished in 1957. New styles not based on revivals of historic architecture were also avidly adopted, like that of the Second Empire copied from France in the 1870s and The Arts and Crafts Movement, which was somewhat a British equivalent of continental Art Nouveau.

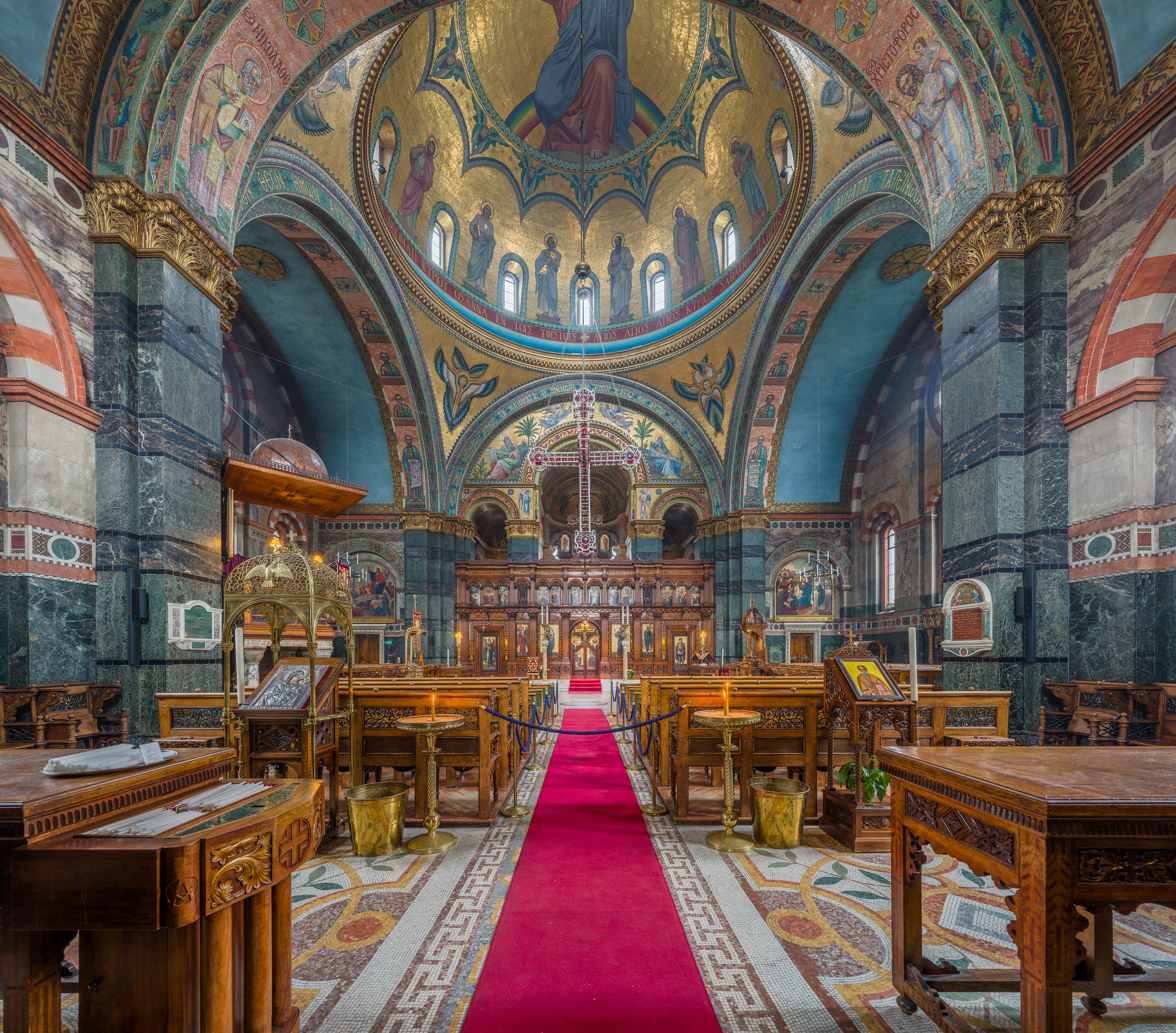
Saint Sophia Cathedral (1882), an example of Byzantine-revival inspired by Hagia Sophia

A distinctive new development in external decoration in late Victorian architecture in terms was the use of terracotta as a decorative appliqué on the outer facade of buildings. Entire buildings were covered in elaborately moulded terracotta tiles, like the Natural History Museum (1880), the rebuilt Harrods department store (1895–1905), and the Prudential Assurance Building at Holborn Bars (1885–1901). Terracotta was advantageous in that it was colourful and did not absorb the heavy air pollution of Victorian London, unlike brick and stone. As Ben Weinreb described terracotta's usage: "it found the greatest favour on the brasher, self-advertising types of building such as shops, theatres, pubs and the larger City offices."

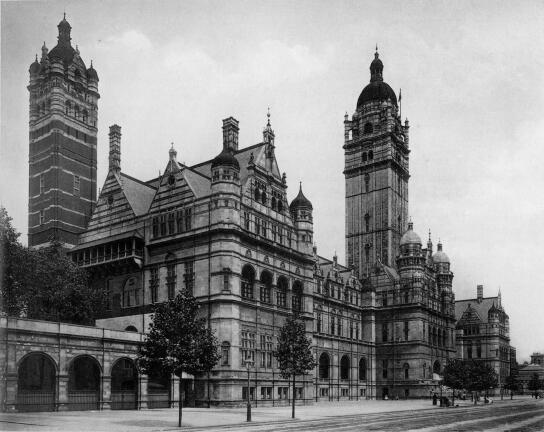
The Imperial Institute (1888), an example of Victorian eclecticism; mixing a wide variety of styles

Perhaps the most unique new style to emerge in the late 19th century was the Arts and Crafts movement. Somewhat mirroring and taking influence from the Art Nouveau style that was prominent in continental Europe, the Arts and Crafts movement articulated itself as a reaction against the changes brought about by the Industrial Revolution in a similar manner to the; embracing traditional craftsmanship and decorative motifs inspired by romanticism, medievalism and nature. Despite this being a similar ethos to the Gothic-revival, this style was far less revivalist and utilised abstract natural forms never seen before in architecture. The most prolific architect of the style in London was Charles Harrison Townsend who designed the Horniman Museum (1900) and the Whitechapel Gallery (1900): two highly original designs described by Nicholaus Pevsner as "without question the most remarkable example of a reckless repudiation of tradition among English architects of the time" This experimentalism of the Arts and Crafts Movement made it an important formative influence on Modernist architecture in Britain during the early 20th century.

Despite the explosive growth of Victorian London and the scale of much of the building that had taken place, by the 1880s and 1890s there was an increasing belief that London's urban fabric was inferior to other European cities and unsuitable for the capital of the world's largest empire. There was little coherent urban planning in London during the Victorian era, apart from major infrastructure projects like the construction of the railways, Thames Embankment and Tower Bridge. Critics compared London to cities like Paris and Vienna, where state intervention and large scale demolition had created a more regular arrangement, with broad boulevards, panoramas and architectural uniformity. London was "visibly the bastion of private property rights", which accounted for the eclecticism of its buildings.

=== The Industrial Revolution: railway, iron-framed and industrial architecture ===
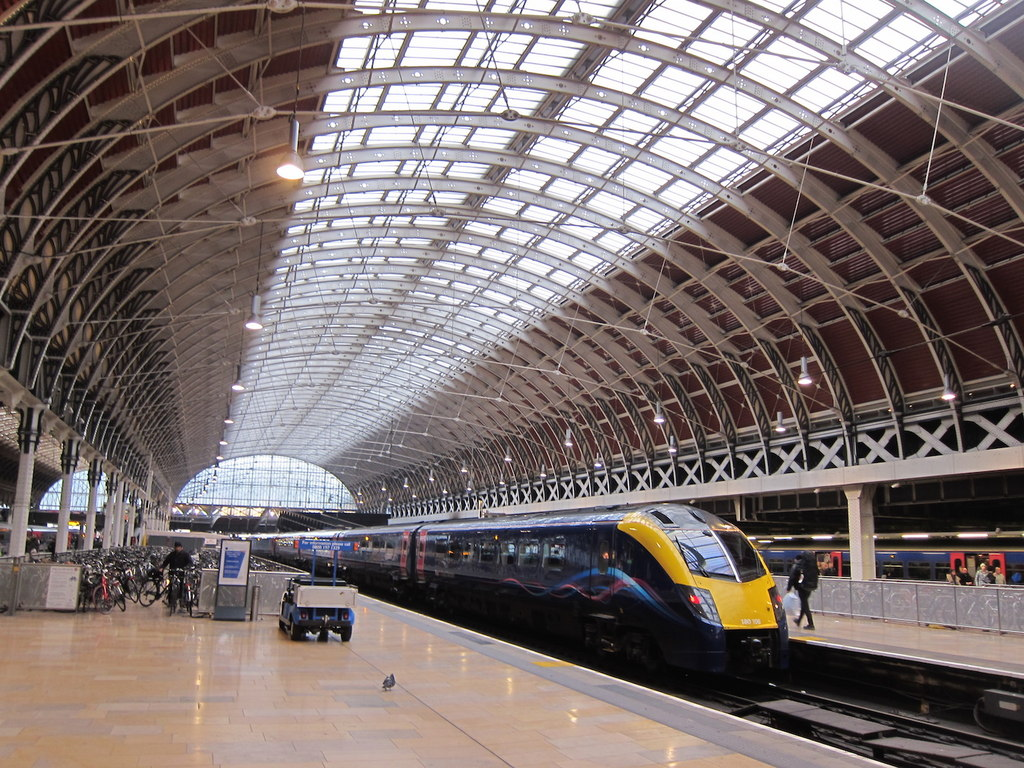
London Paddington station (1838–54) by Isambard Kingdom Brunel, a marvel of Victorian railway architecture

The Industrial Revolution which began in Britain in the late 18th and early 19th century created a great deal of new building types and infrastructure that were a product of the new industries and technologies that it produced. The most obvious example of this was the arrival of the railways which greatly transformed the cityscape and structure of London. The first railway to be built in London was the London and Greenwich Railway, a short line from London Bridge to Greenwich, which opened in 1836. This was soon followed by great rail termini which linked London to every corner of Britain. These included Euston railway station (1837), Paddington railway station (1838), Fenchurch Street station (1841), Waterloo railway station (1848), King's Cross railway station (1852), and St Pancras railway station (1868).

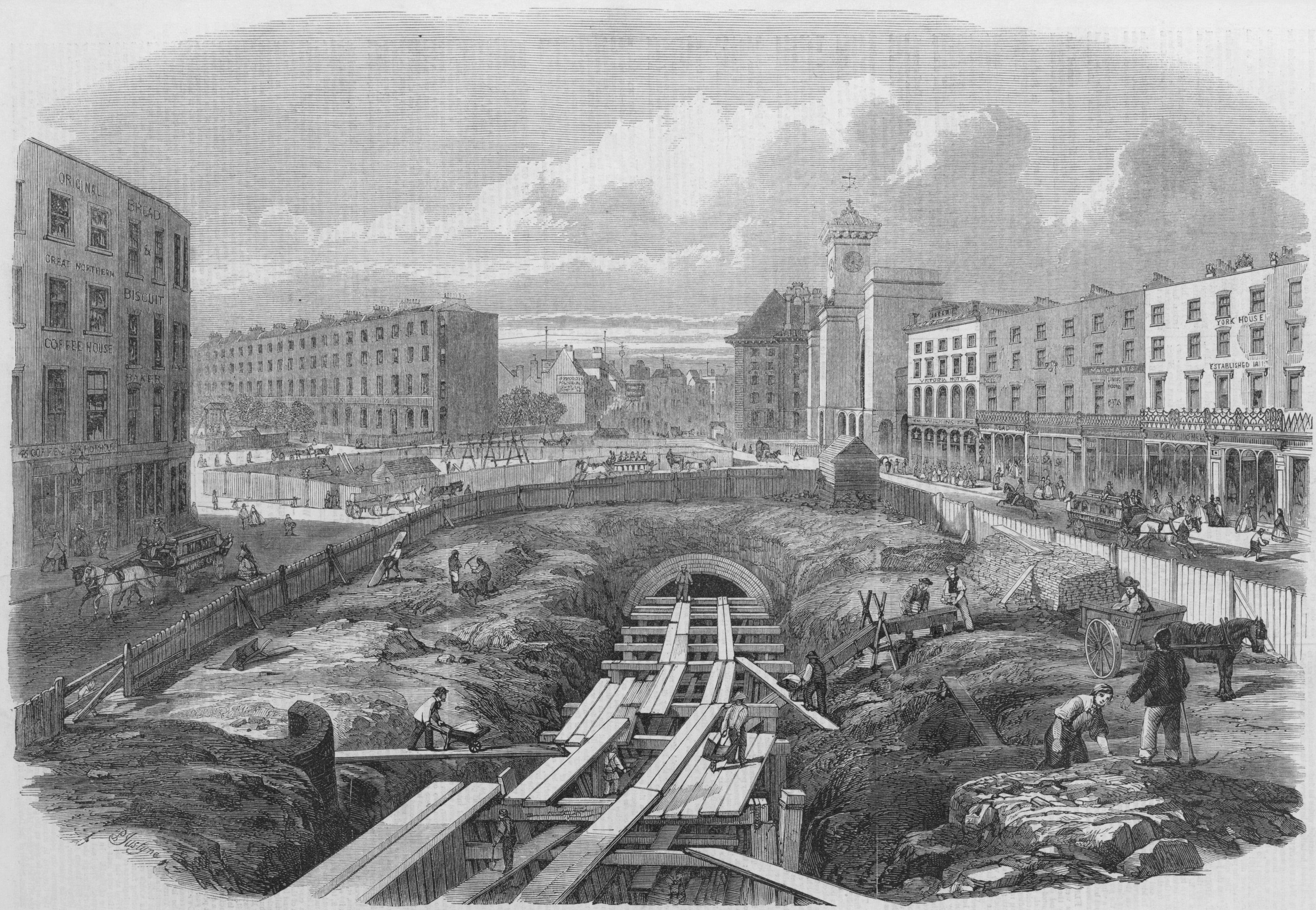
The construction of the world's first underground railway: The Metropolitan Railway (1863)

London also became the first city in the world to have an underground railway system. With traffic congestion on London's roads becoming more and more serious, proposals for underground railways to ease the pressure on street traffic were first mooted in the 1840s, after the opening of the Thames Tunnel in 1843 proved such engineering work could be done successfully. Begun in 1860 and completed in 1863, the Metropolitan Railway inaugurated the world's oldest mass transit system, the London Underground; it was created by the cut-and-cover method of excavating a trench from above, then building reinforced brick walls and vaults to form the tunnel, and filling in the trench with earth. Some of the original underground station architecture from the Metropolitan Railway still survives at Baker Street tube station complete with a brick arched roof with vents to ventilate the steam from the original Victorian locomotives.

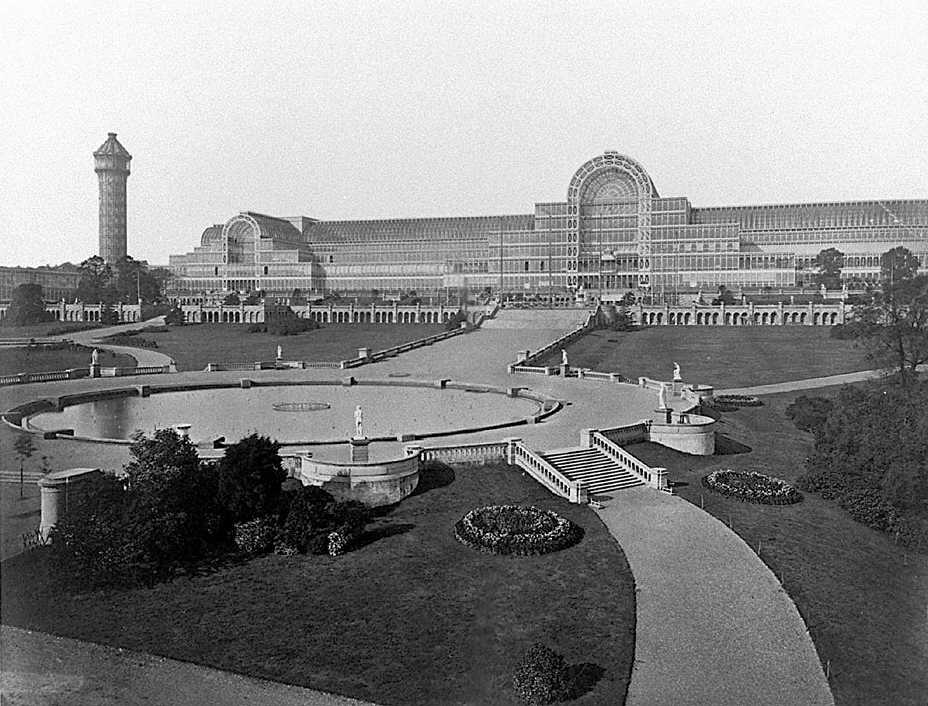
The Crystal Palace by Joseph Paxton (1854), an engineering marvel for its time which burnt down in 1936

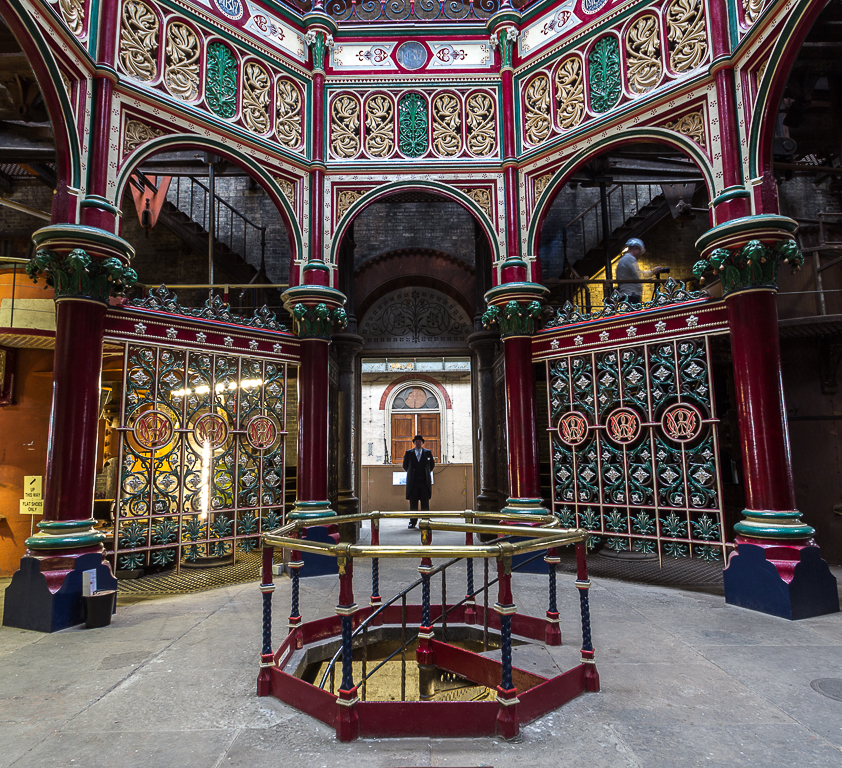
The interior of Crossness Pumping Station (1865) showing the decorative use of cast-iron

Advancements in engineering during the industrial revolution made available the use of new building materials such as iron, enabling its use to build the first iron-framed structures in history. Iron beams afforded unprecedented span and height in new buildings, with the added advantage of being fireproof. The greatest embodiment of iron's possibilities was found in Joseph Paxton's Crystal Palace, a 990,000-square-foot (9.2-hectare) exhibition hall made of cast iron and plate glass, which opened in 1851. Before that, iron was already being used to gird the roofs of the King's Library in the British Museum, built between 1823 and 1827, the Reform Club (1837–1841), Travellers Club (1832), and the new Palace of Westminster. The technological advancements pioneered with the Crystal Palace would be applied to the building of London's great railway termini in the latter half of the century: St. Pancras, Liverpool Street, Paddington, King's Cross, and Victoria. King's Cross was a relative latecomer; built in 1851 to support incoming traffic for the Crystal Palace exhibition, its arched glass terminal sheds (each 71 ft (22 m) wide) were reinforced with laminated wooden ribs which were replaced in the 1870s with cast iron. London Paddington had already set the model for train stations built with iron support piers and framework, when it was completed in 1854 to the designs of the greatest of Victorian engineers, Isambard Kingdom Brunel. Other innovations in Victorian infrastructure and industry such as new sewage systems, power stations and gas works further transformed London's cityscape. But as well as from a technological point of view, many of these buildings were interesting stylistically, with some examples being remarkably decorative despite their utilitarian functions and often mirroring the stylistic trends occurring in domestic, commercial and even ecclesiastical architecture. A particularly notable example is Crossness Pumping Station (1865), a former sewage pumping station built in an ornate Romanesque-revival style, with extensive decorative use of cast-iron. This was described by the historian Nicholas Pevsner as a "masterpiece of engineering – a Victorian cathedral of ironwork".

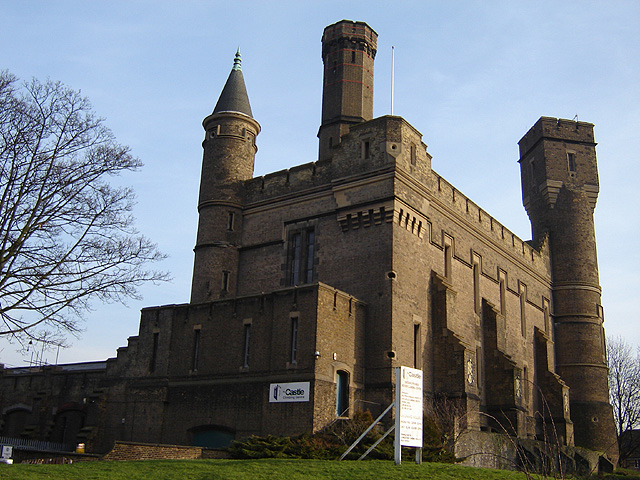
The Engine House, Stoke Newington (1854)

Another notable example - also a pumping station but in this case for drinking water - was the Engine House, Stoke Newington (1854), a large brick building which was designed to resemble a medieval fortress, complete with towers, battlements, bartizans and other historicist elements. This stylistically somewhat mirrors the trend for building follies: an integral part of the early Gothic-Revival. A much more discreet example was the world's first coal-fired power station was built at Holborn Viaduct in 1882, intended to provide electricity for the many new streets lamps being installed in the centre of London, as well as for private homes and other buildings. This was completely concealed behind the facades of new commercial buildings with Italianate and Gothic-revival facades, belying its industrial function.

=== Victorian domestic architecture ===
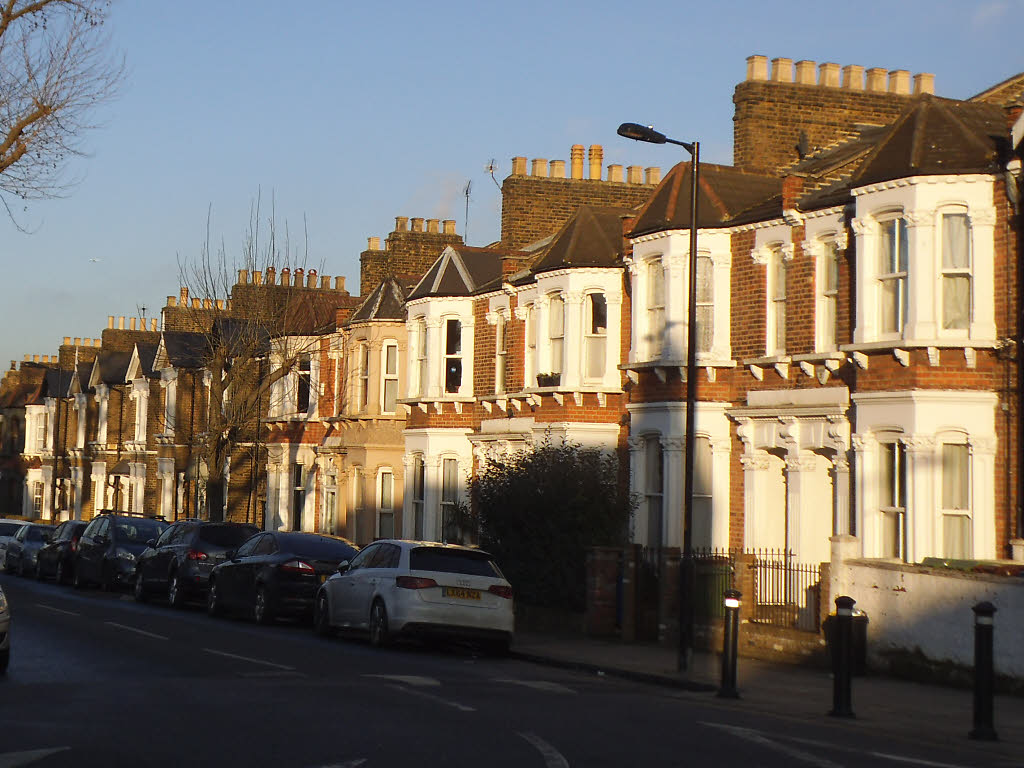
Typical mid-late Victorian suburban houses like these dominate large areas of London to this day. Such houses are stylistically eclectic, reflecting the Victorian tendency of mixing historicist influences.

London's great expansion in the 19th century was driven by housing growth to accommodate the rapidly expanding population of the city. The growth of road building and the railways in this period fuelled the outward expansion of suburbs, as did a cultural impetus to escape the inner city, allowing the world's of 'work' and 'life' to be separate. Suburbs varied enormously in character and in the relative wealth of their inhabitants, with some being for the very wealthy, and others being for the lower-middle classes. They frequently imitated the success of earlier periods of speculative housing development from the Georgian era, although the Victorian Era saw a much wider array of suburban housing built in London. Terraced, semi-detached and detached housing all developed in a multitude of styles and typologies, with an almost endless variation in the layout of streets, gardens, homes, and decorative elements.

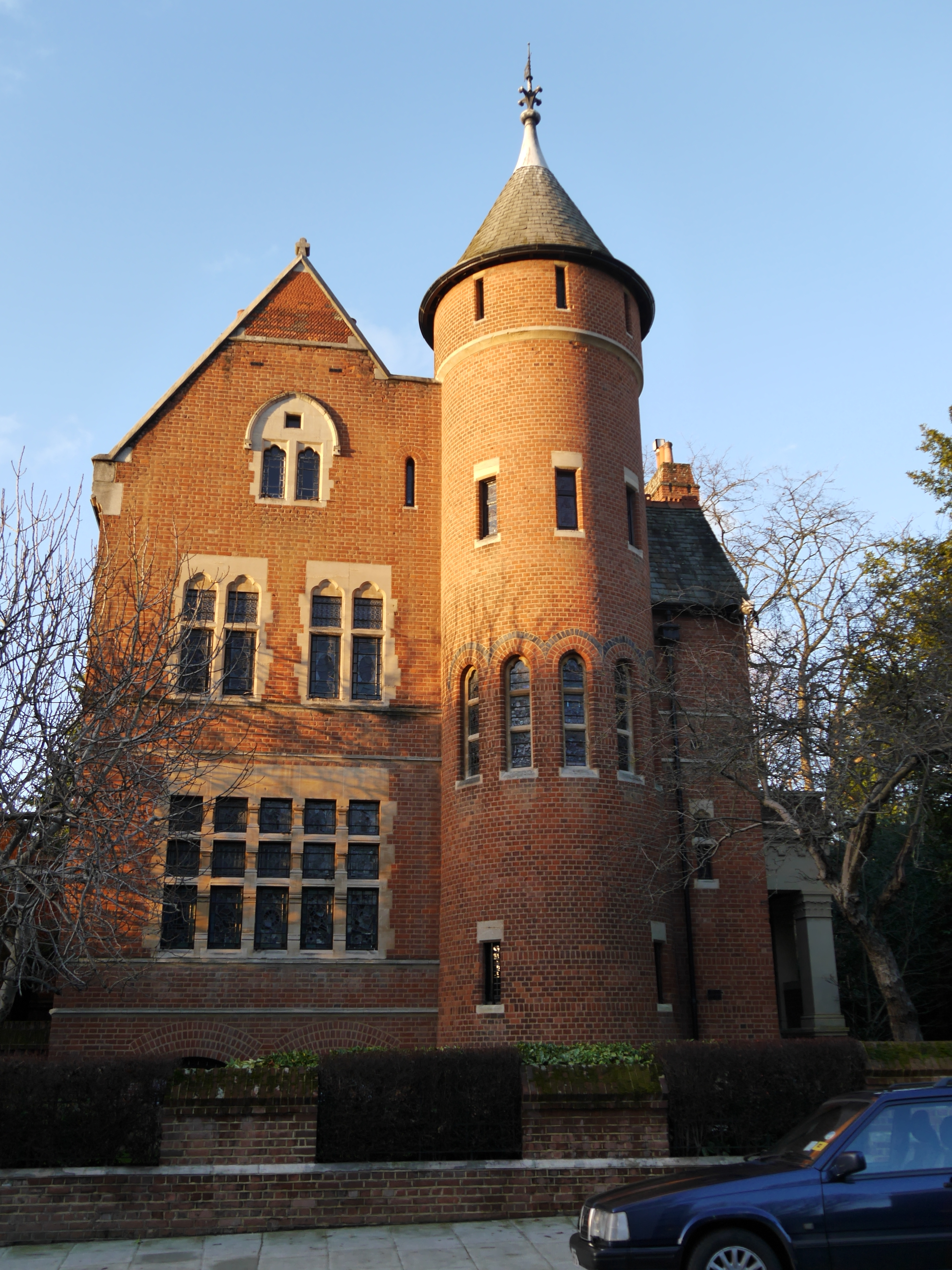
The Tower House (1881) by William Burges has a highly ornate Gothic-revival interior.

Early in the Victorian era, up to the 1840s houses were influenced by the classicism of Regency architecture. However, the simplicity of Regency classicism fell out of favour as affluence increased and by the 1850s the Italianate style influenced domestic architecture which now incorporated varying quantities of stucco. From the 1850s domestic buildings became increasingly influenced by the Gothic Revival, incorporating features such as pointed, projecting porches, bay windows, and grey slate. This progressive change in style resulted from several factors. In the 1850s, the abolition of tax on glass and bricks made these items cheaper, while suitable materials and the coming of the railways allowed them to be manufactured elsewhere, at low cost and to standard sizes and methods, and brought to site. From the 1850s, building regulations were progressively introduced which to some extent created greater standardisation and uniformity in housing design.

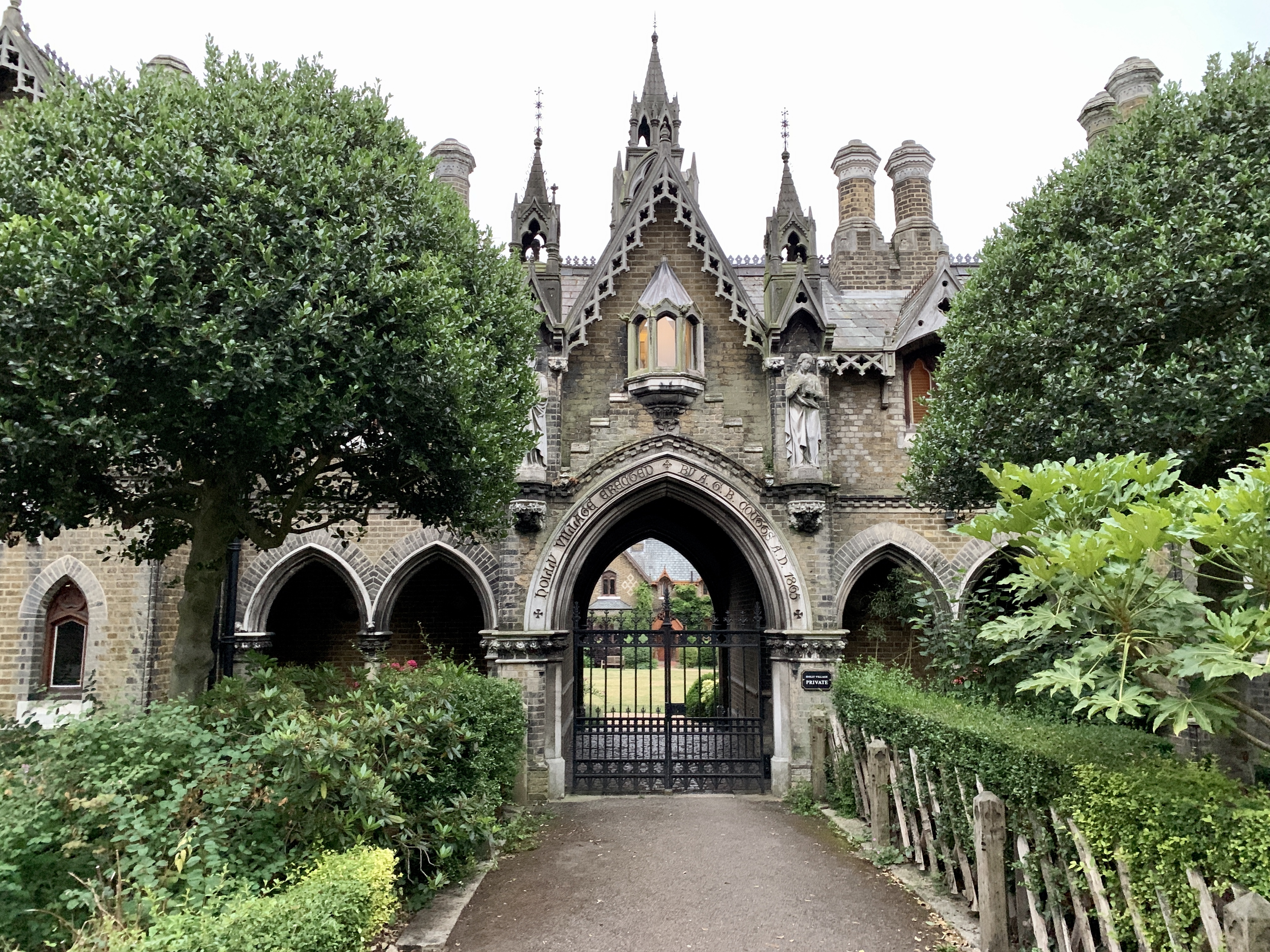
Gatehouse to the gardens of Holly Village, Highgate (1865)

In terms of the more extravagant houses built in London during the Victorian period, many were built in a more gothic influenced style than was the norm for smaller houses. A particularly notable example is The Tower House (1881) designed by the prominent Gothic-Revival architect William Burges as his personal home. Its interior is particularly notable, with ornate wall paintings and other medievalist features. It was described by the architectural historian J. Mordaunt Crook as "the most complete example of a medieval secular interior produced by the Gothic Revival, and the last" Another example of High Gothic used in a domestic context in London is Holly Village in Highgate (1865), a cluster of ornate gothic cottages set amongst private gardens. They were designed by James Cubitt and commissioned by the wealthy Victorian philanthropist Baroness Angela Burdett-Coutts. They somewhat mirror the format of many Victorians alms-houses, which were also built in a similar garden plan and in a gothic style, such as The Bruce Castle Almshouses in Tottenham (1871). In contrast, the few large houses built within central London during this period tended to retain a more classical style, a prominent example being Bridgewater House (1854) by Charles Barry, a significant example of Italianate architecture in London, which was somewhat influenced by the Italian Palazzos of the renaissance.

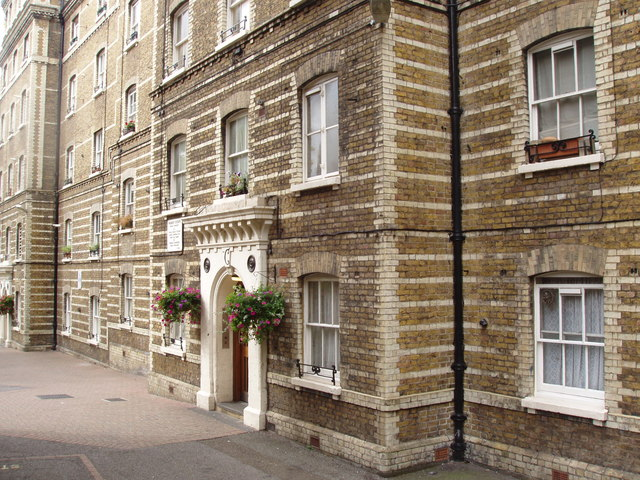
A brick apartment block built by the Peabody Trust in Southwark. This early social housing was funded by philanthropists, in contest to the state funded social housing of the 20th-century.

Largely as a result of the extremely rapid expansion of London's population in the 19th century, the living conditions for much of the working classes in Victorian London were extremely poor due to a lack of appropriately planned housing, intense overcrowding and poor sanitation. This was particularly prevalent in Inner and East London, with significant areas of these districts being regarded as slums, typically consisting of very dense late-18th and 19th century terraced housing. Local government took the crude approach of clearing such areas with little provision of replacement housing for the evicted occupants. Philanthropists and private companies in the form of the model dwellings companies such as the Peabody Trust made the most concerted effort to provide appropriate housing for London's poor, building homes intended to be affordable and provide good living conditions. These usually took the form of substantially sized brick tenement blocks around five to six stories high. While many were austere in design, other more decorative examples were built in the fashionable styles of the day such as Jacobethan and even Gothic-revival, with many such examples surviving in Inner London to this day.

== Edwardian Architecture (1901–1914) ==
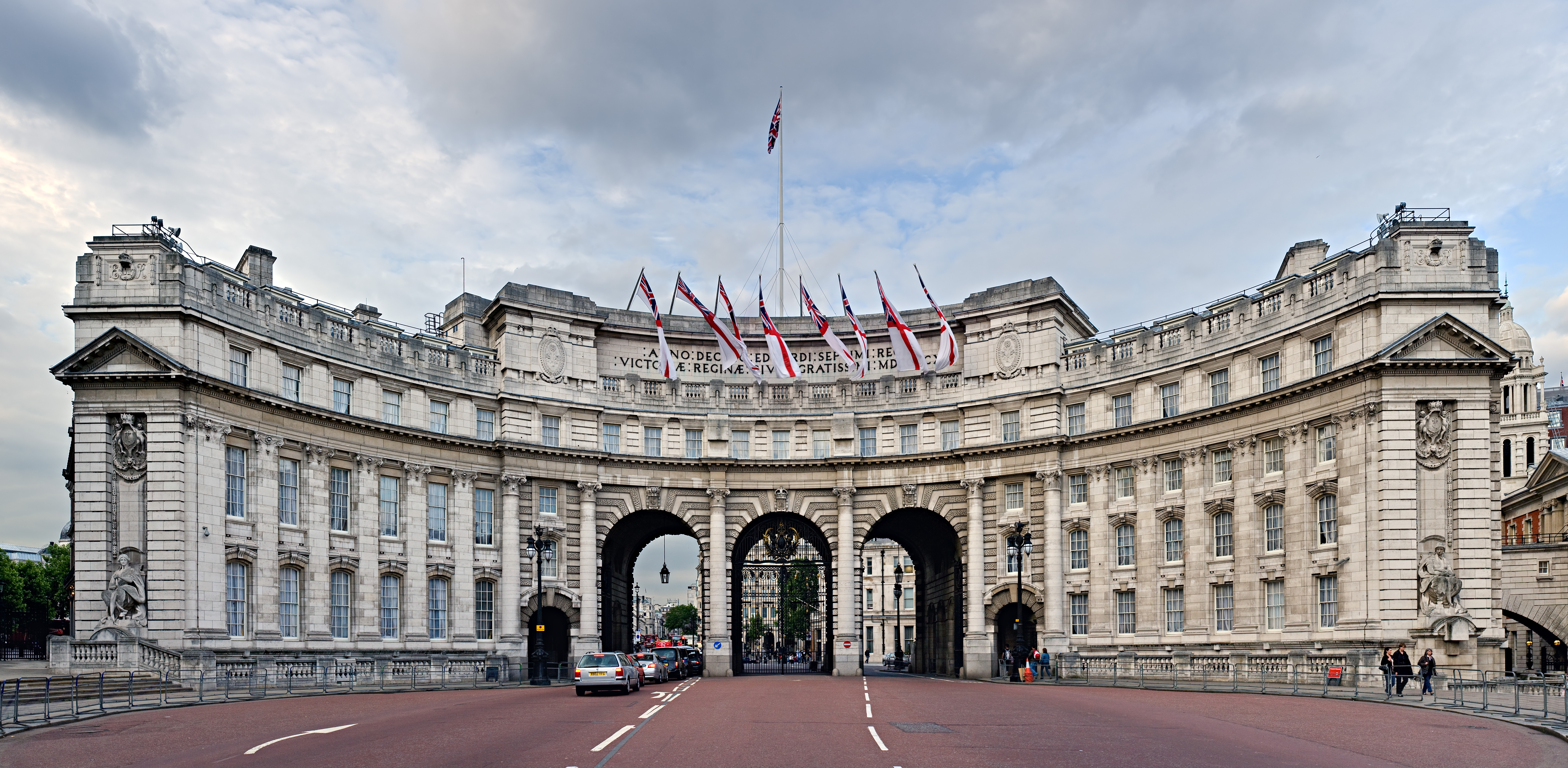
Admiralty Arch, The Mall, commissioned by King Edward VII and designed by Aston Webb (1912) who also remodeled Buckingham Palace in a similar style.

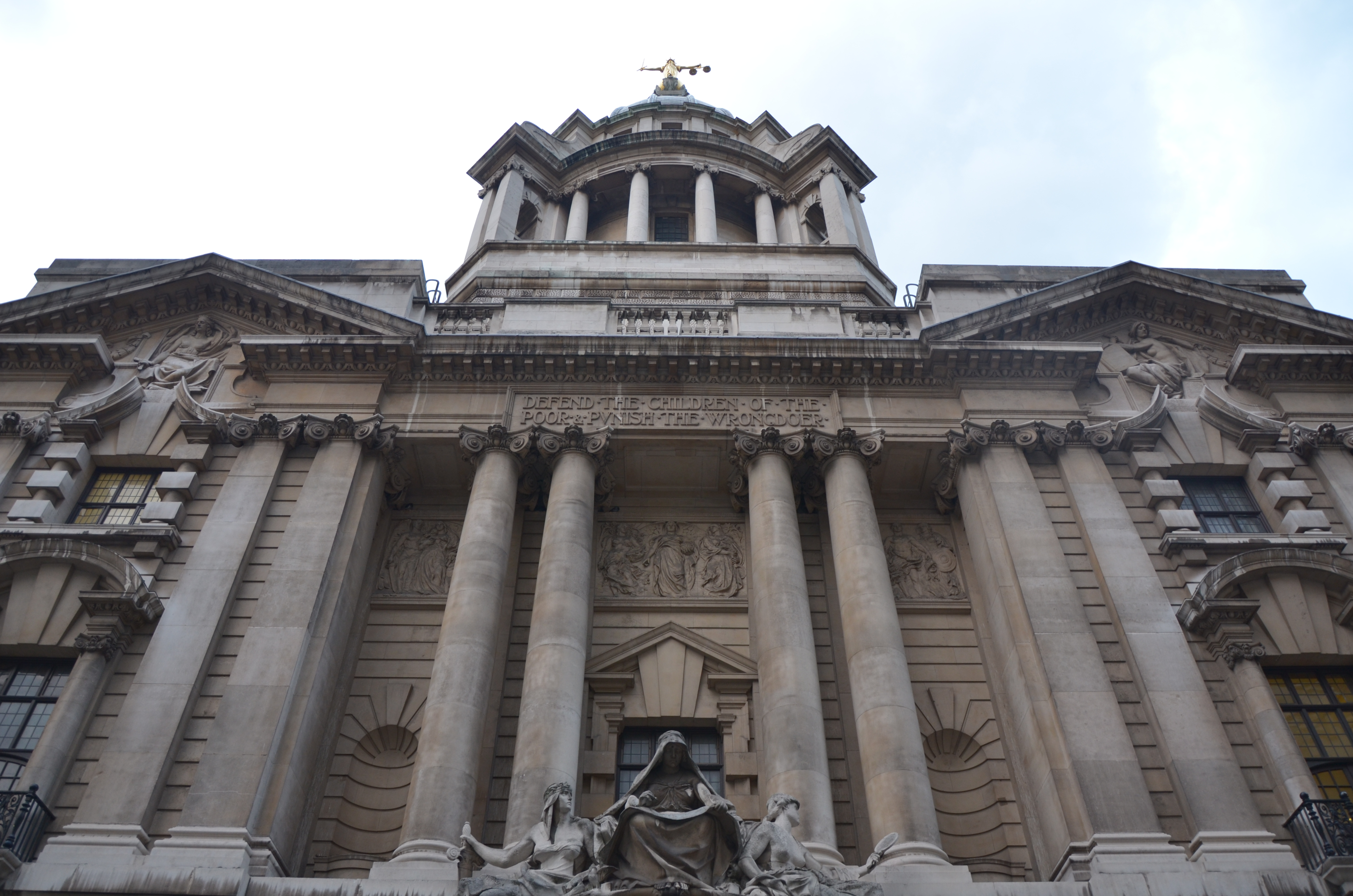
The Old Bailey (1902), a prominent example of Edwardian Baroque in London strongly influenced by Christopher Wren

=== Edwardian Baroque, Beaux Arts and other classical styles ===
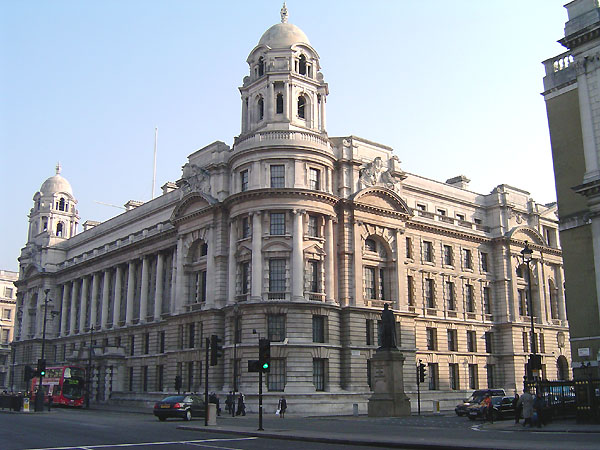
The War Office (1906) by William Youing

The dawn of the 20th century and the death of Queen Victoria (1901) saw a shift in architectural taste and a reaction against Victorianism. The popularity of Neoclassicism, semi-dormant during the latter half of the 19th century, revived with the new styles of Beaux-Arts and Edwardian Baroque, also called the "Grand Manner" or "Wrenaissance", for the influence that Wren's work had on this movement. Neoclassical architecture suited an "Imperial City" like London because it evoked the grandeur of the Roman Empire and was monumental in scale. Trademarks include rusticated stonework, banded columns or quoins of alternating smooth and rusticated stonework, exaggerated voussoirs for arched openings, free-standing columns or semi-engaged pilasters with either Corinthian or Ionic capitals, and domed roofs with accompanying corner domes or elaborate cupolas. In adopting such styles, British architects evoked hallowed English Baroque structures like St. Paul's Cathedral and Inigo Jones' Banqueting House. Municipal, government, and ecclesiastical buildings of the years 1900–1914 avidly adopted Neo-Baroque architecture for large construction works like the Old Bailey (1902), County Hall (begun in 1911), the Port of London Authority building (begun 1912), the War Office (1906), and Methodist Central Hall (1911). The most impressive commercial buildings constructed during the Edwardian era include the Ritz Hotel on Piccadilly (1906), Norman Shaw's Piccadilly Hotel (1905), Selfridges department store (1909), and Whiteleys department store (1911). All of these were built in variations of Neoclassicism: Beaux-Arts, Neo-Baroque, or Louis XVI. The firm of Mewès & Davis, partners who were alumni of the École des Beaux-Arts, specialised in 18th century French architecture, specifically Louis XVI. This is evident in the Ritz Hotel and Inveresk House, the headquarters of the Morning Post, on Aldwych.

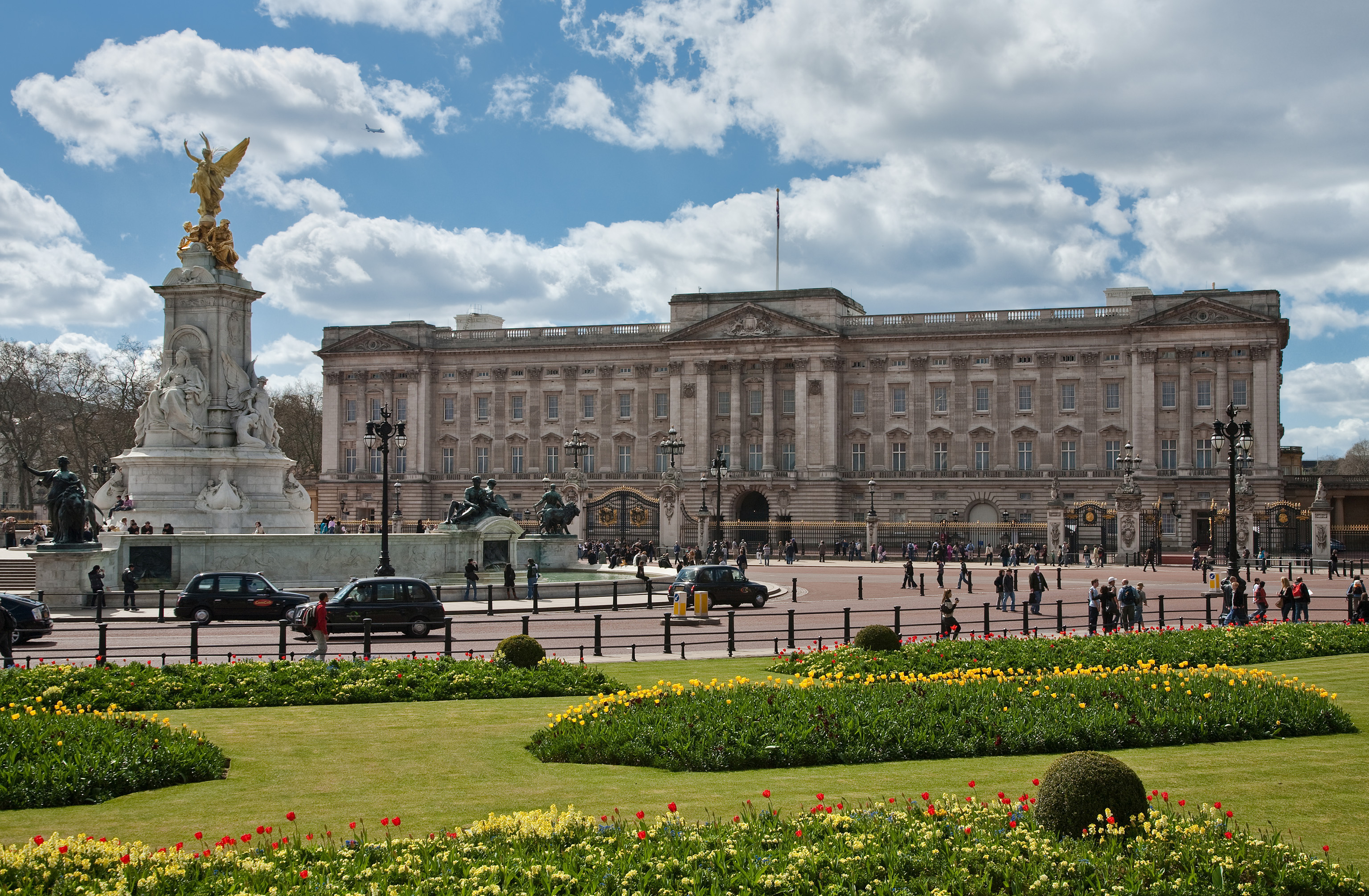
The baroque style Victoria Memorial (1911) by Thomas Brock and the remodelled Buckingham Palace (1914) by Aston Webb.

The two most important architectural accomplishments in London during the Edwardian years were the building of Kingsway and the creation of an enormous processional route stretching from Buckingham Palace to St. Paul's Cathedral. A grand parade route for state pageantry, a common feature of European cities, was felt to be sadly lacking in London. To accomplish this a group of buildings standing between the Mall and Trafalgar Square were demolished and replaced with the grand Neo-Baroque edifice of Admiralty Arch. This created one grand east–west parade route encompassing Buckingham Palace, Trafalgar Square via Admiralty Arch, then connecting with the newly widened Strand, and thence to Fleet Street. The 82 ft (25 m) high Victoria Memorial was erected in front of Buckingham Palace (unveiled in 1911) and encircled by four ceremonial gates dedicated to the British dominions: Canada Gate, Australia Gate, South and West Africa Gates. In 1913 the decaying Caen stone on the façade of Buckingham Palace, blackened by pollution and deteriorating, was replaced with a more impressive facing of Portland stone.

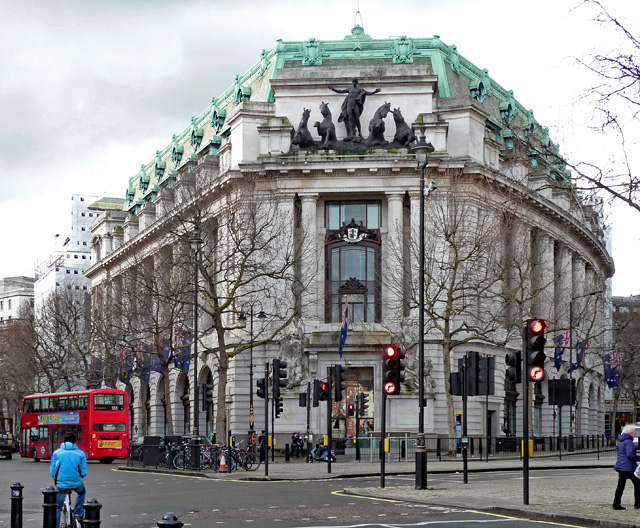
Australia House (1913), part of the grand replanning of the Aldwych and Kingsway areas.

Kingsway, a 100-foot (30 m) wide boulevard with underground tram tunnel stretching north–south from the Strand to High Holborn, was the culmination of a slum clearance and urban regeneration project initiated by the Strand Improvement Bill of 1899. This involved the clearance of a notorious Holborn slum known as Clare Market, between Covent Garden and Lincoln's Inn Fields The north side of the Strand was demolished, allowing the street to be widened and more impressive and architecturally sound buildings to be constructed. Lining these grand new boulevards were impressive new theatres, hotels, and diplomatic commissions in imposing Neoclassical, Portland stone-clad designs. These new buildings included the headquarters of Britain's most important imperial possessions: India House, Australia House, with South Africa House built in the 1930s opposite Trafalgar Square. There were plans to demolish two churches along the Strand, St Mary le Strand and St Clement Danes, the latter designed by Sir Christopher Wren, because they were protruding into the street and causing traffic congestion. After public outcry the Strand was instead widened to go round these churches, creating 'islands' in the middle.

=== Use of steel ===
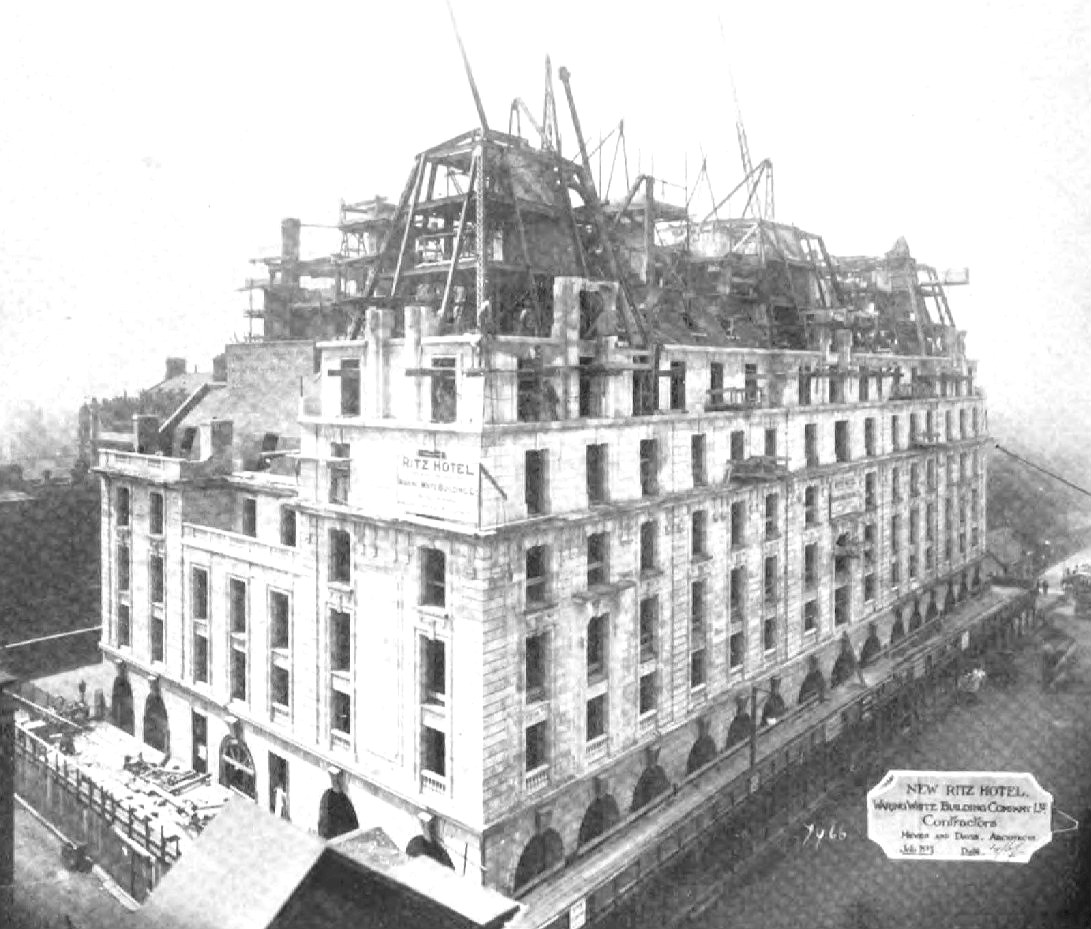
The Ritz (1906) under construction with steel frame visible.

In the first decade of the 20th century, the use of steel to reinforce new buildings advanced tremendously. Steel piers had been used in isolation to support the National Liberal Club (1886) and the rebuilt Harrods department store (1905). The extension of 1904–05 to the Savoy Hotel used steel framing for the whole construction, followed closely by the Ritz Hotel (1906); the latter gained popular reputation as the first building in London to be steel-framed. The abundance of domes in the Edwardian period is partly attributable to steel girders, which made large domes lighter, cheaper to build, and easier to engineer.

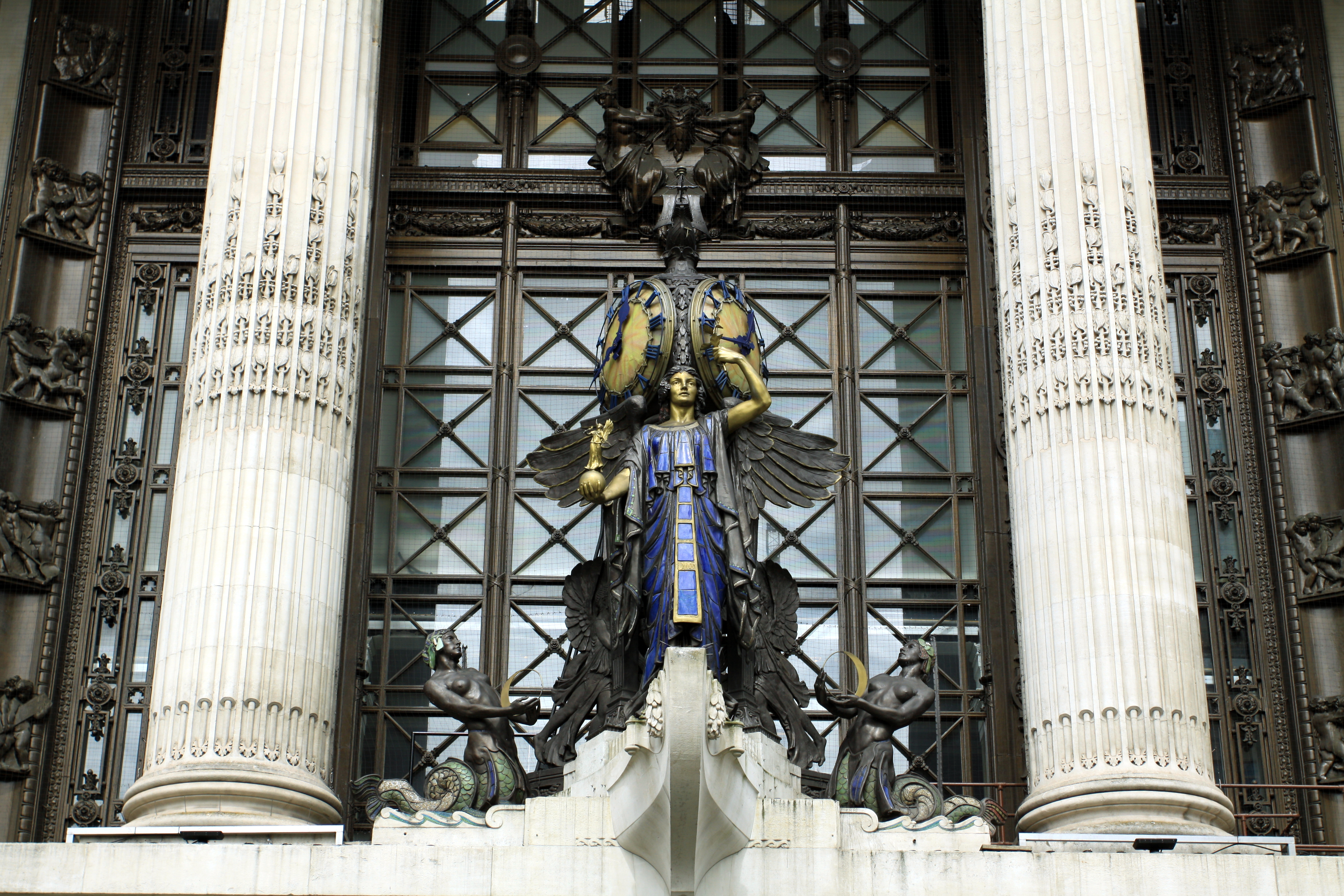
Selfridges (1907) a large steel framed department stor.e

Selfridges on Oxford Street, modelled after American-style department stores, was the true watershed, because its size was unprecedented by British standards and far exceeded existing building regulations. To gain planning approval, Selfridge's architect Sven Bylander (the engineer responsible for the Ritz) worked closely with the London County Council (LCC) to update the LCC's woefully outdated regulations on the use of steel, dating back to 1844. In 1907 he gained approval for his plans, and by 1909, when Selfridges opened, the LCC passed the LCC (General Powers) Act (the Steel Act), which provided comprehensive guidelines for steel-framed buildings and a more streamlined process for gaining planning permission. By this point, steel reinforcement was de rigueur in any sizable public or commercial building, as seen in the new buildings proliferating along Aldwych and Kingsway.

=== Use of terracotta and ceramics ===
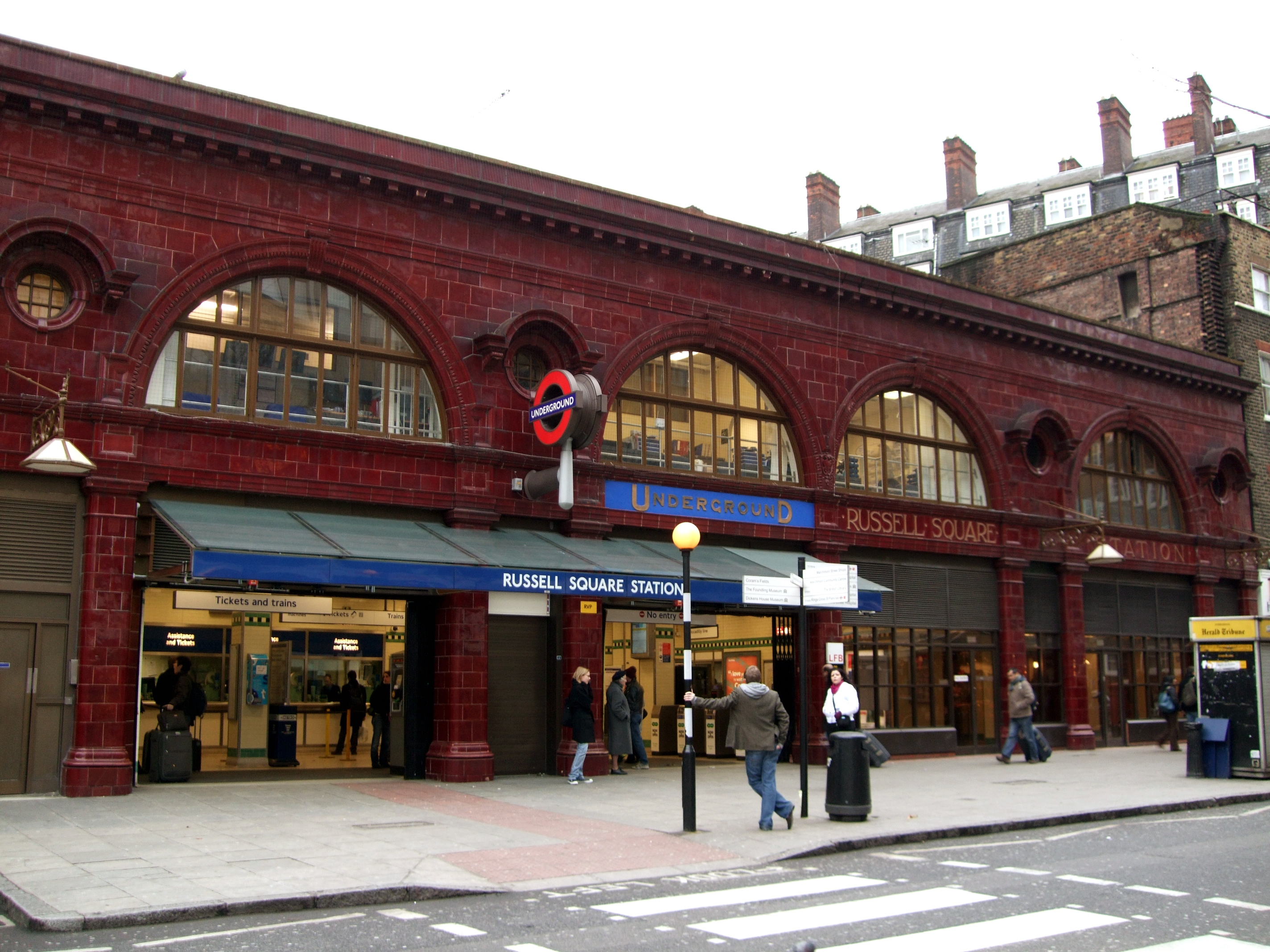
Russell Square Tube Station (1906) by Leslie Green.

The popularity of terracotta for exterior cladding waned in favour of glazed ceramic tiles known as glazed architectural terracotta (often called "faience" at the time). Outstanding examples include the Strand Palace Hotel (1909) and Regent Palace Hotel (1914), both clad in cream-coloured 'Marmo' tiles manufactured by Burmantofts Pottery; Michelin House (1911); and Debenham House (1907). London Underground stations built during the Edwardian years, namely those on the Piccadilly Line and Bakerloo Line, all employ glazed tile cladding designed by Leslie Green. The signature features of these stations are glazed oxblood red tiles for the station exteriors, ticket halls clad in green and white tiles, and platforms decorated in individual colour themes varying between stations. Glazed tiles had the added advantages of being easy to clean and impervious to London's polluted atmosphere.

=== The Arts and Crafts Movement ===
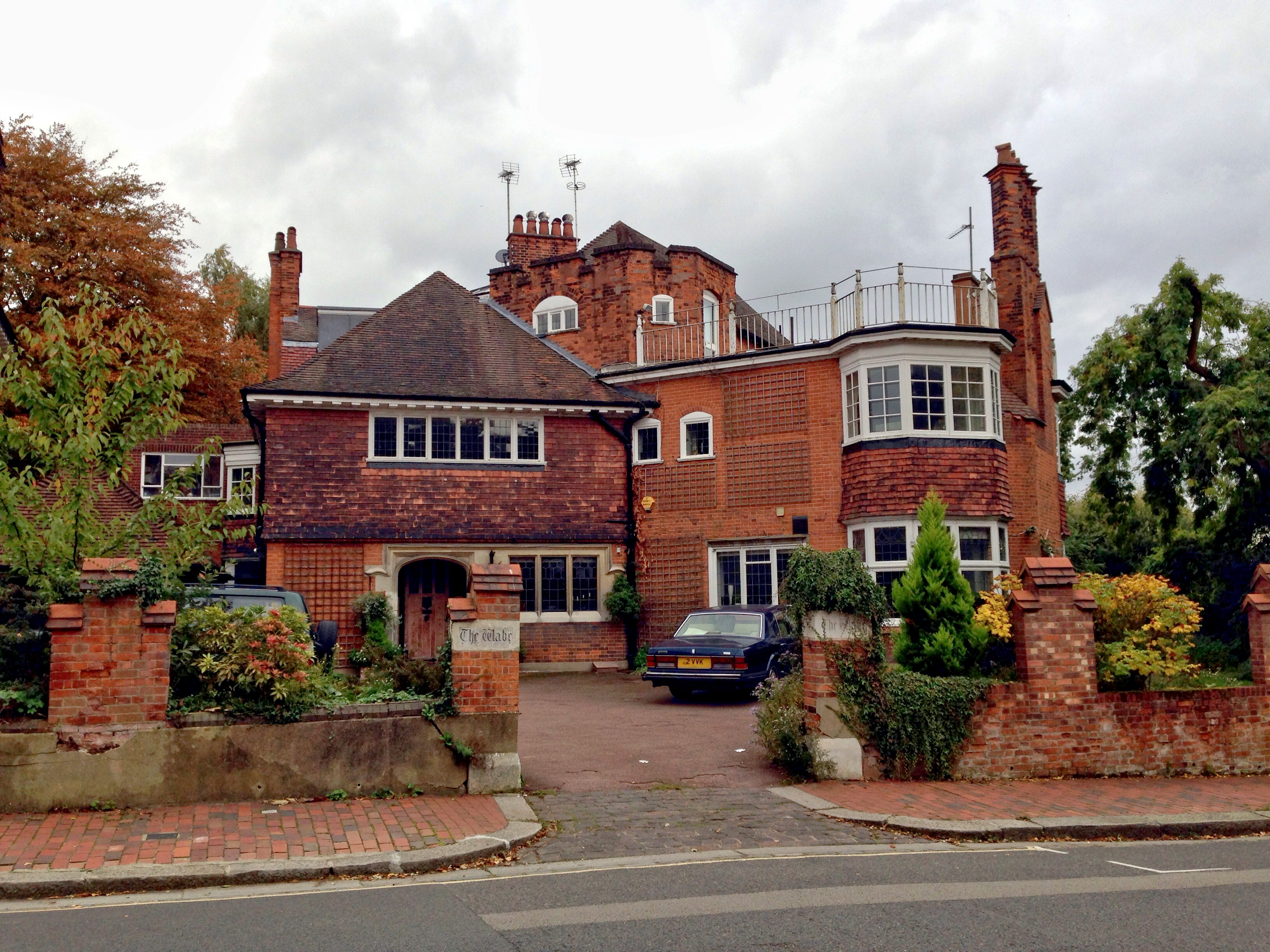
The Wabe (1903) a large arts and crafts house in Hampstead.

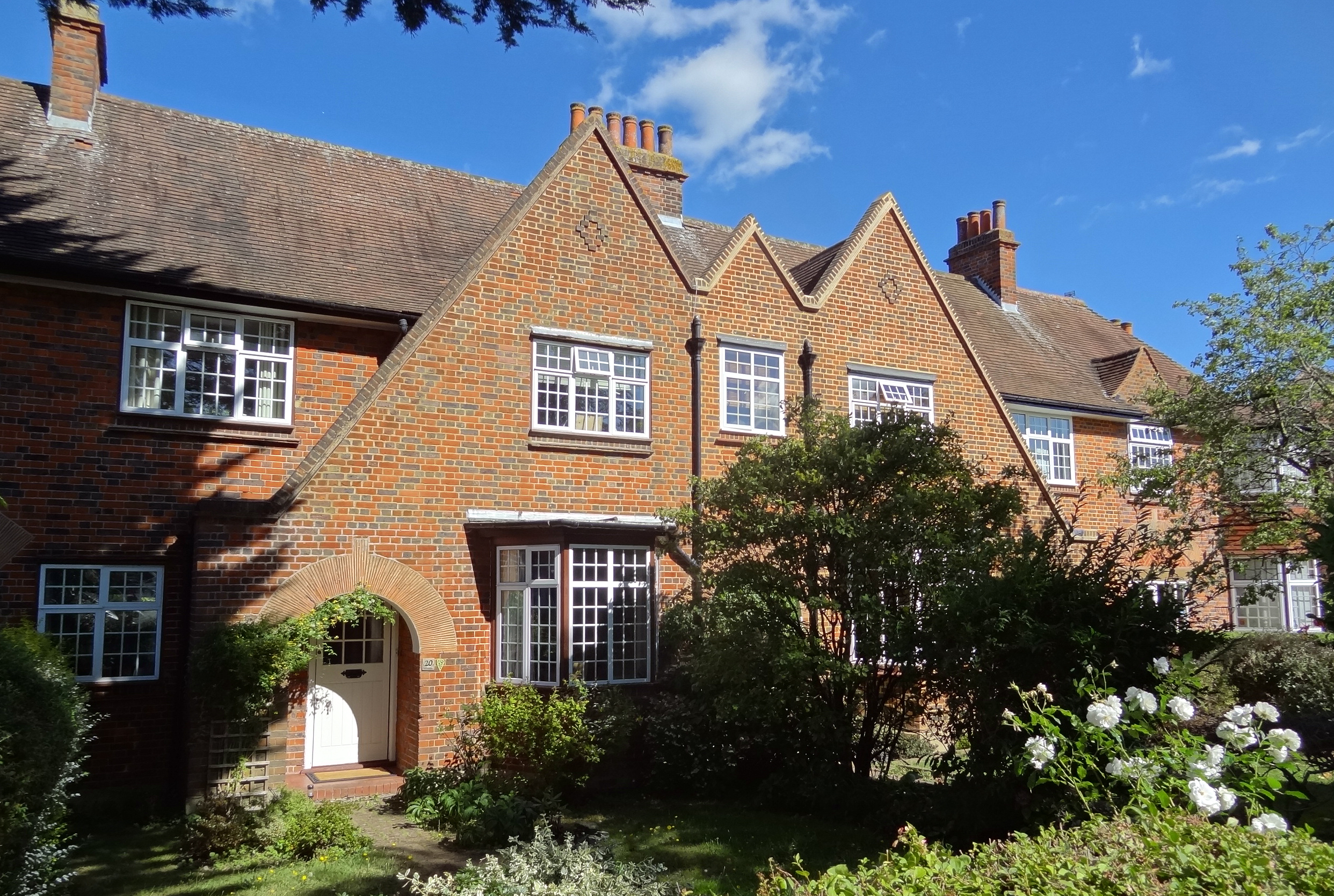
Arts and crafts houses in Sutton Garden Suburb (1912).

In contrast to the opulence and grandeur of large public buildings built in baroque-revival styles, one of the most idiosyncratic styles of the late 19th and early 20th century was used in the design of many of London's Edwardian domestic buildings: The Arts and Crafts movement. Somewhat inspired by a rejection of the modernity of the industrial revolution and taking influence from folk culture, nature, medievalism as well as the continental Art-Nouveau style, this style was particularly popular for the design of suburban housing, particularly in so called 'garden cities'. The garden city movement of town planning was inspired by similar ideals to The Arts and Crafts Movement, attempting to create suburban housing that replicated the traditions and aesthetics of the pre-industrial, rural societies. This was reflected in numerous green spaces, large gardens, low density of housing, referencing medieval domestic and building houses well away from the city centre in a semi-separate settlement. Numerous such garden cities were built in outer London in the Edwardian period, many with a strong arts and crafts influenced. A prominent example of this in London Romford Garden Suburb (1911) which has over 140 unique Arts and Crafts houses and Sutton Garden Suburb (1914) which is now a conservation area.. Houses of this style often strongly refenced Tudor timber framed architecture, utilised a restrained colour pallet for their exterior decoration, were deliberately unsymmetrical and had a large garden, all in an attempt to give them a 'rustic' charm. More faithful Tudor-revival was also commonly used in this kind of suburban housing.

=== Art Nouveau and The Modern Style ===
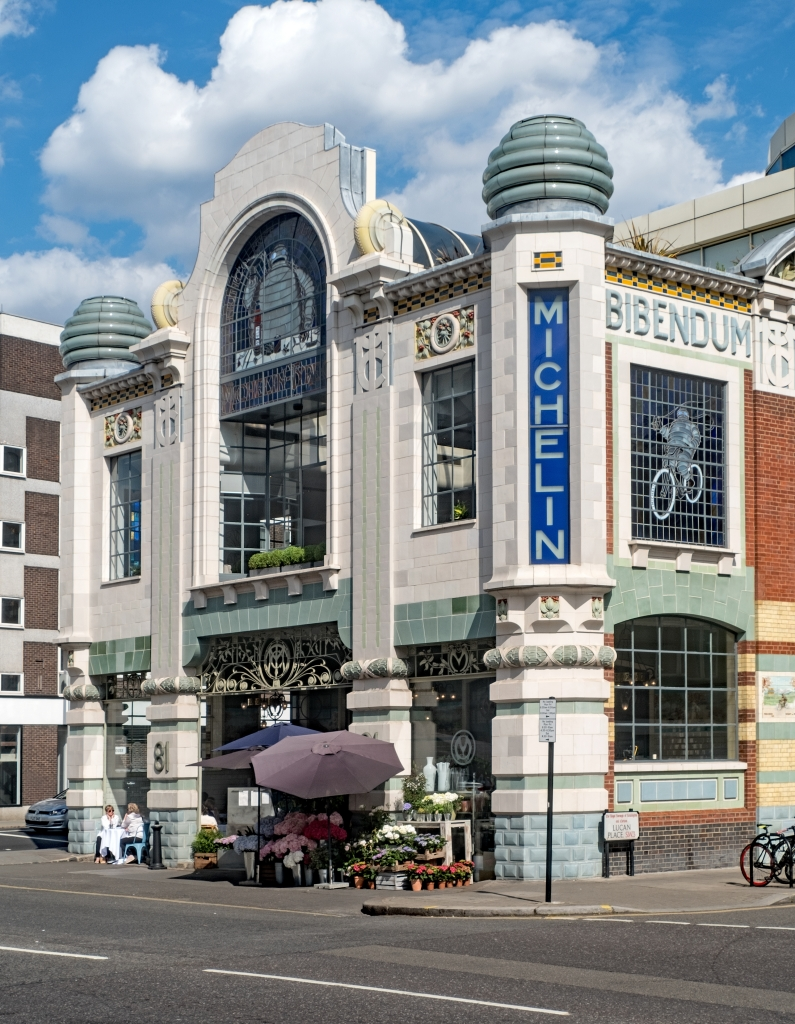
Michelin House (1911) an example of art-nouveau influenced Modern Style.

A rare example of a grand house in Central London influenced by arts and crafts is Debenham House (1907) by Hasley Ricardo, notable for its colourful tiled exterior and arts and crafts interiors. Some similarly grand public and ecclesiastical buildings were also influenced by the style, the most famous examples the Horniman Museum (1901) by Charles Harison Townsend. This unusual building which features decorative mosaics and floral motifs throughout the exterior illustrates a variation of the arts and crafts style known as The Modern Style, which is interpreted as a British variation of the art-nouveau movement. Other examples of this style in London such as The Bishopsgate Institute (1894), Whitechapel Art Gallery (1901) and Michelin House (1911), typically had a façade decorated with tiling or terracotta, with some examples like Michelin House being much closer to the continental art-nouveau. One of the most prominent yet unusual art-nouveau influenced buildings in London is Middlesex Guildhall (1913) now the Supreme Court, which Nikolaus Pevsner described as "art nouveau gothic style" due to its use of gothic ornamentation, with proportions more reminiscent of the moderns style. In contrast, modern style was also used in more humble buildings, most notably in several pubs in Central London, such as The Fox and Anchor (1898) with an ornate filed facade and the dramatically situated Black kfriar (1905) which is notable for its ornate frescos and mosaics.

=== Neo Georgian and Stripped Classicism ===
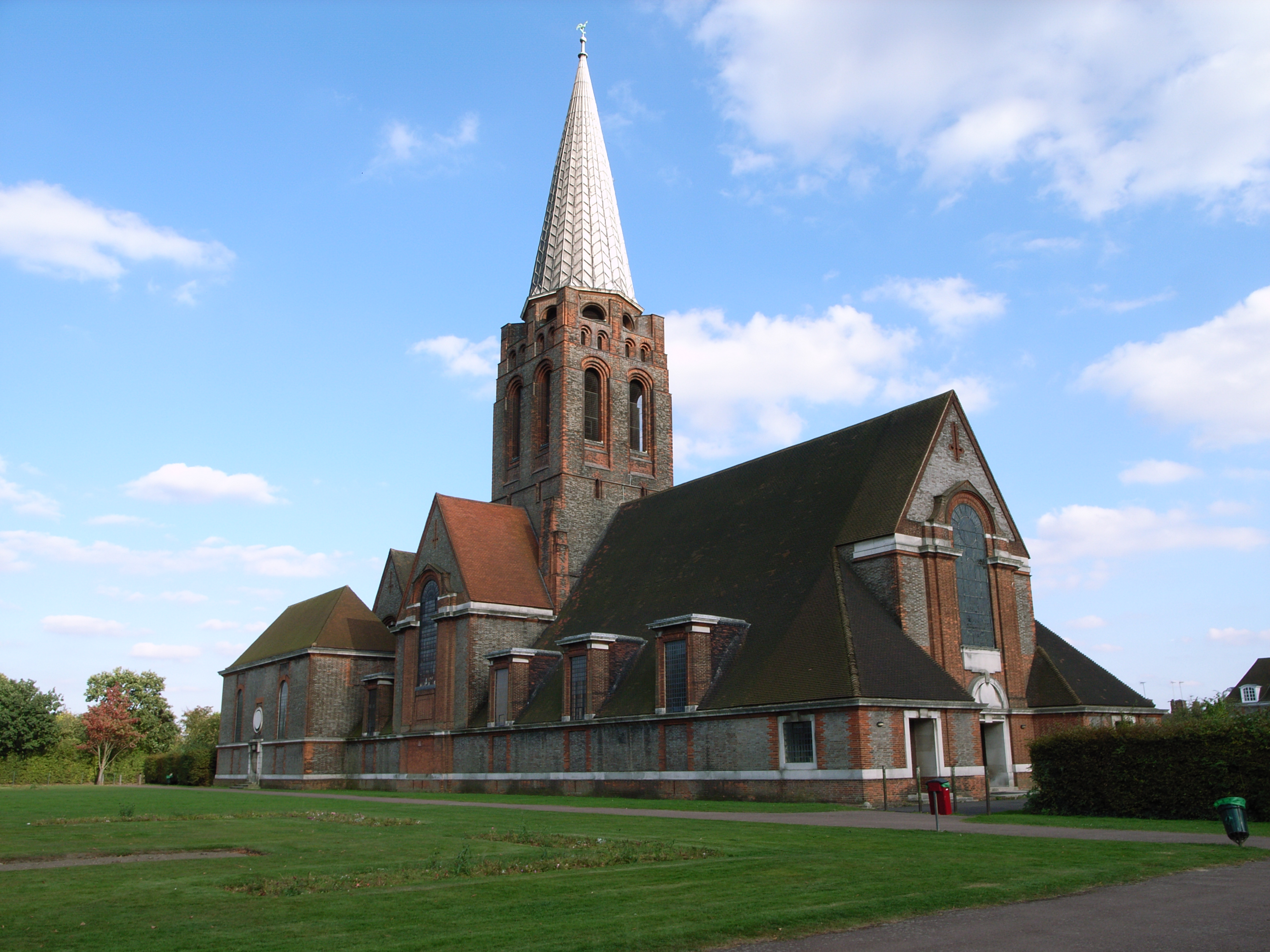
St.Jude's Church (1907) Edwin Lutyens, epitomising the restrained classicism used in some garden cities of the period.

In contrast to the prevailing arts and crafts approach to most suburban housing, Neo-Georgian was a commonly used style for construction of houses in Central London. A grand example of this is 4 Cowley Street (1904) in Westminster, a faithful re-creation of an early Georgian town house, which has a grand arts and crafts interior. Classical styles were also used in some suburban architecture but in a more restrained manner that some have described as stripped classicism. A notable example of this is Hampstead Garden Suburb in North London, with substantial contributions by the classical architect Edwin Lutyens. This includes two unusual, somewhat classical style churches built of brick, the largest being St.Jude's Church (1907), which some historians have described as Queen-Anne Revival in style, but due to Lutyens unique style it does not fit comfortably into any category. The houses in this Garden Suburb are also somewhat classically derived, but are very plain and austere in style.

== Interwar and art deco architecture (1919–1939) ==
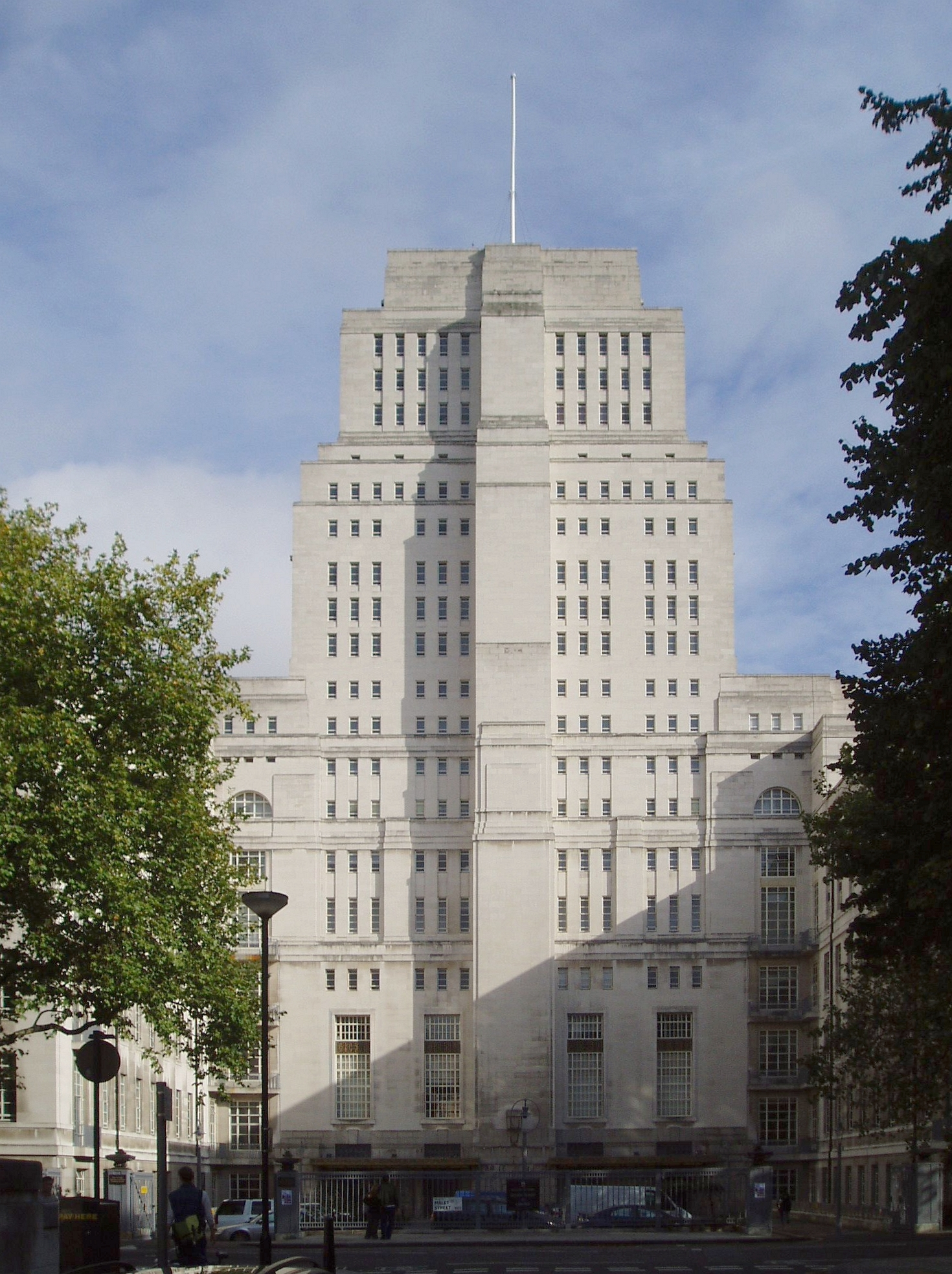
Senate House (1937), often described as one of London's first skyscrapers, built in an austere blend of art deco and neoclassicism.

After the end of World War I, several outstanding building projects begun before 1914 were finally completed. The sombre mood and straitened financial circumstances of interwar Britain made the flamboyant Neo-Baroque style no longer suitable for new architecture. Instead, British architects turned back to the austere, clean lines of Georgian architecture for inspiration. Consequently, Neo-Georgian was the preferred style for municipal and government architecture well into the 1960s. The sale and demolition of many of London's grandest aristocratic houses gave rise to some of the largest private building projects of the interwar period, built to Art Deco or Neo-Georgian designs. These include The Dorchester (Art Deco) and the Grosvenor House Hotel (Neo-Georgian) on Park Lane, both on the sites of grand London houses of the same names. Many buildings clustered around Georgian squares in Central London were demolished and replaced, ironically enough, with Neo-Georgian edifices in near-identical styles but larger. Grosvenor Square, the most exclusive of London's squares, saw the demolition of original Georgian buildings in favour of the uniform Neo-Georgian townhouses which currently surround the square on the north, east and south sides. In St James's Square several buildings were demolished and rebuilt in the Neo-Georgian style, including Norfolk House.

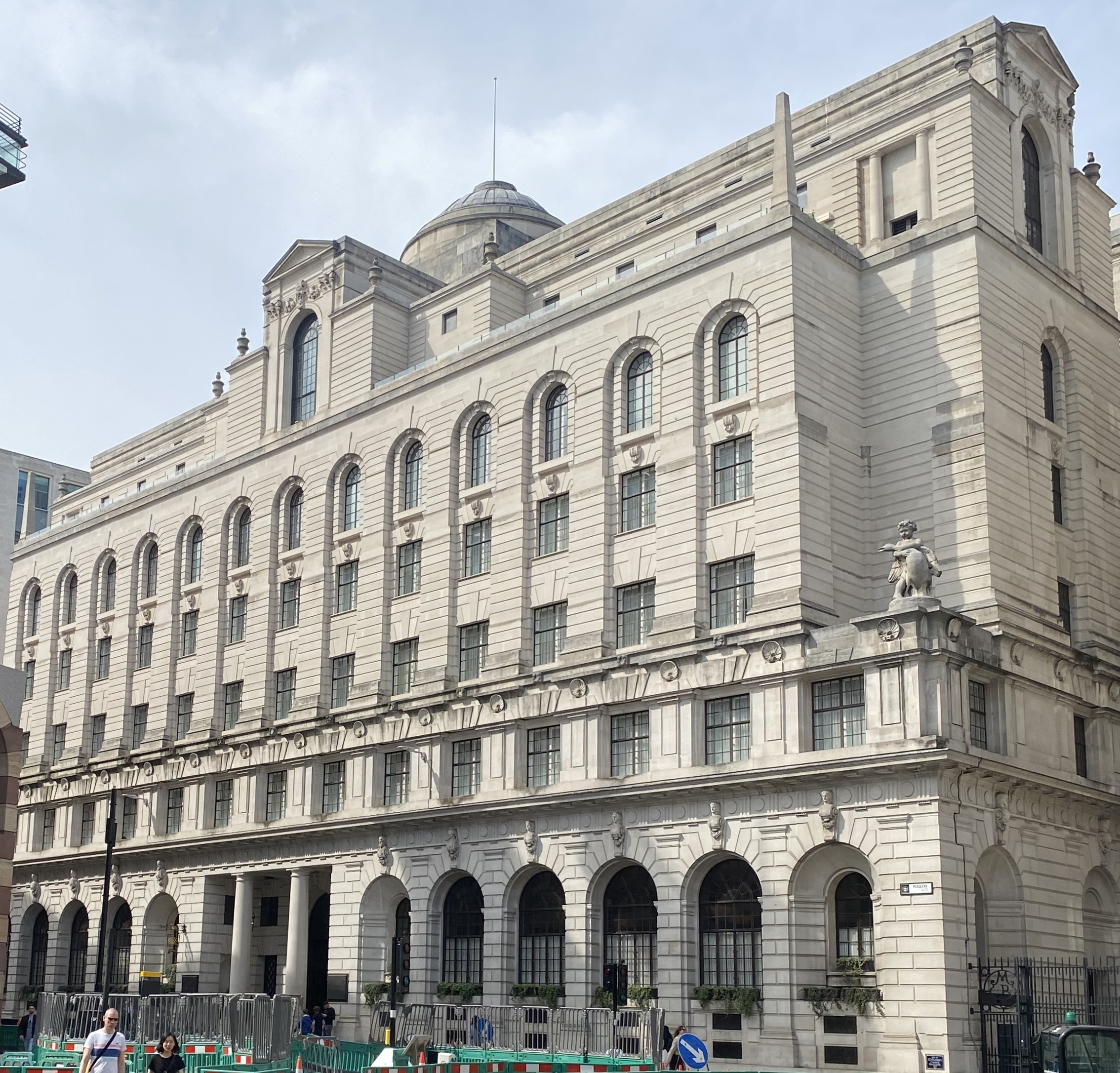
The Midland Bank, Cheapside (1922) by the highly prolific Edwin Luytens, a notable example of interwar neoclassical architecture.

Neo-Classical architecture remained popular for large building projects in London, but it dispensed with the heavy ornamentation and bold proportions of the Baroque-revival that characterised the Edwardian era. It remained the preferred style for banks, financial houses, and associations seeking to communicate prestige and authority. Perhaps the most prominent example of interwar Neoclassicism is the rebuilt Bank of England in the City of London, designed by Sir Herbert Baker and built between 1921 and 1937. The most influential proponent of Neoclassicism in interwar Britain was Sir Edwin Lutyens. His distinctive form of Neoclassicism can be seen in London with the Cenotaph, the monolithic, streamlined war memorial built of Portland stone on Whitehall; the Midland Bank building; and Britannic House in Finsbury Circus, both in the City of London, and the headquarters of the British Medical Association in Tavistock Square, Bloomsbury. In Westminster, a fine example of interwar Neoclassicism is Devonshire House, an office building constructed between 1924 and 1926 on the site of the former London house of the Dukes of Devonshire. Classicism of this style was almost exclusively executed in the ever-popular Portland stone.

=== Art Deco Architecture ===
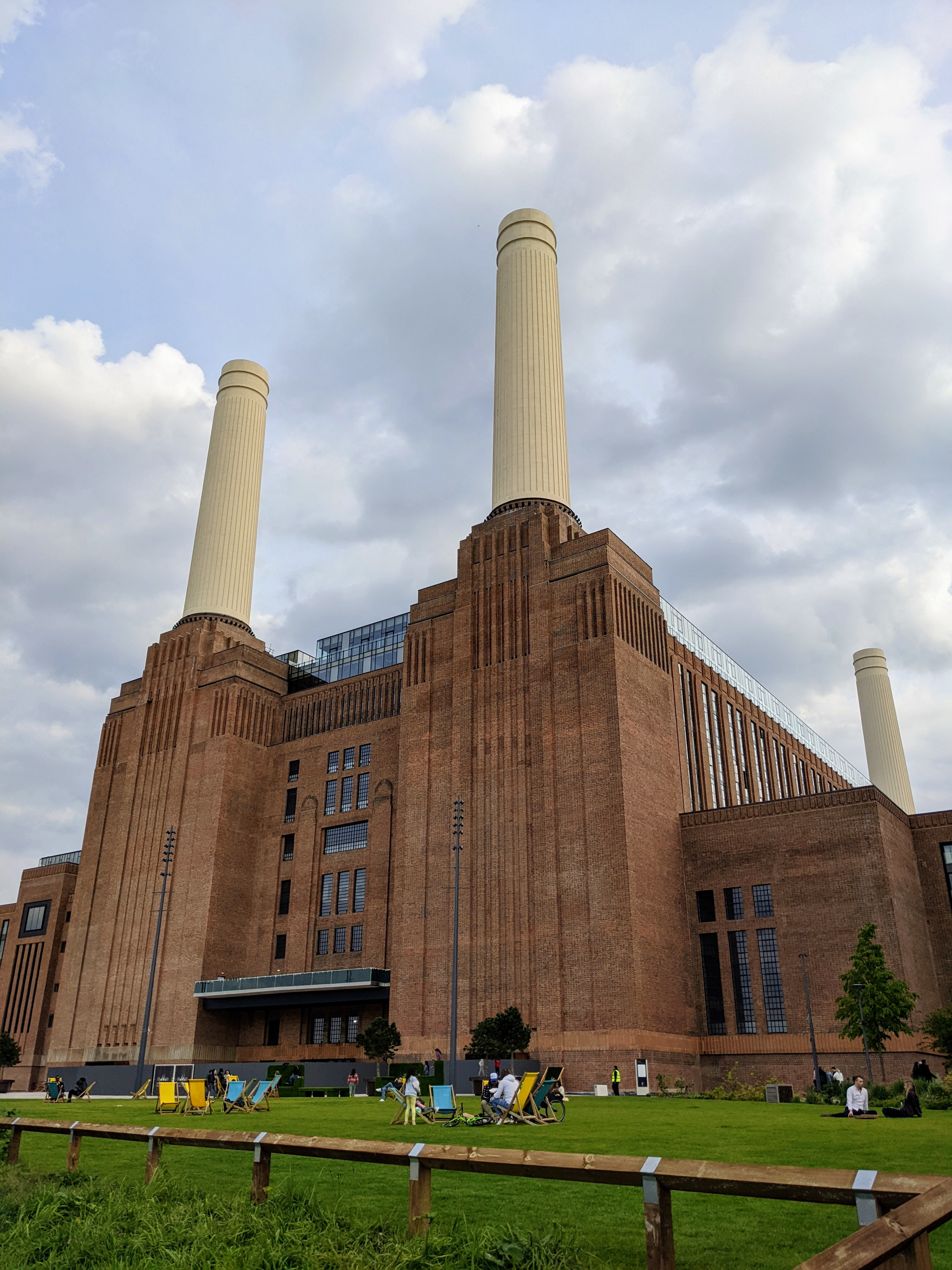
Battersea Power Station (1933), an example of the Art Deco style used in an industrial building

Existing alongside the more prevalent Neo-Georgian and Neoclassical forms of architecture used in the capital in the 1920s and 1930s, Art Deco was nonetheless an extremely popular style from about 1925 to the later 1930s. The true stimulus was the 1925 International Exhibition of Modern Decorative and Industrial Arts in Paris, where Art Deco had been developed roughly 20 years earlier. London, alongside New York City and Paris, became an innovative and experimental ground for Art Deco architecture. This is defined by clean lines, curves, geometric patterns, bold colour, and elaborate, stylised sculptural accents. Art Deco was adopted most enthusiastically by "modern" businesses and those seeking to advertise their modernity and forward-thinking attitude. These included cinemas, media headquarters, airports, swimming pools, factories, and power stations (such as Battersea Power Station). It was a flashy, luxurious style, so it was well adapted for department stores (e.g. Simpsons of Piccadilly), theatres, hotels, and blocks of flats.

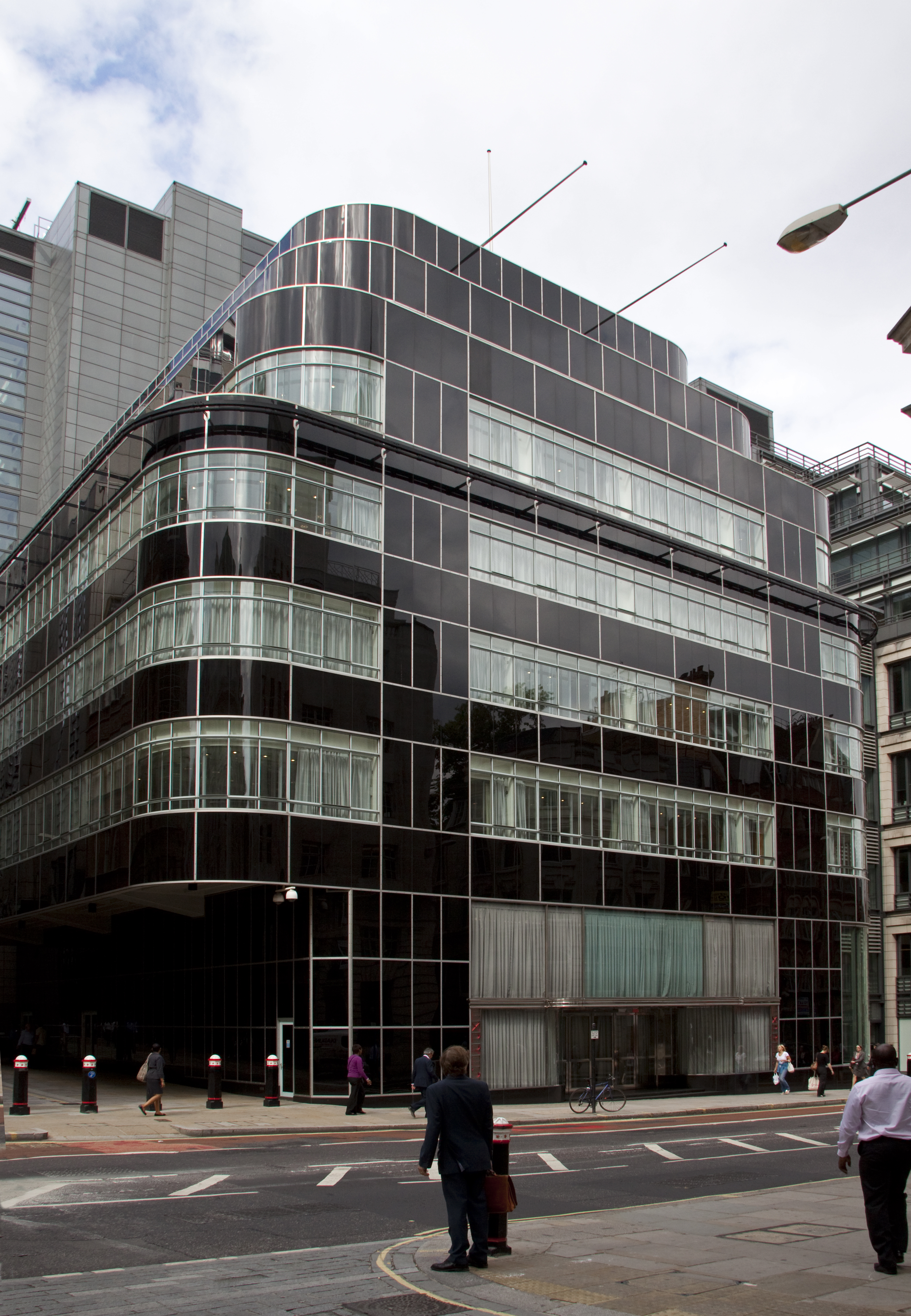
The Daily Express Building (1932), an example of the Streamline-Moderne style of Art Deco. The glass outer walls are a very modern feature for the time.

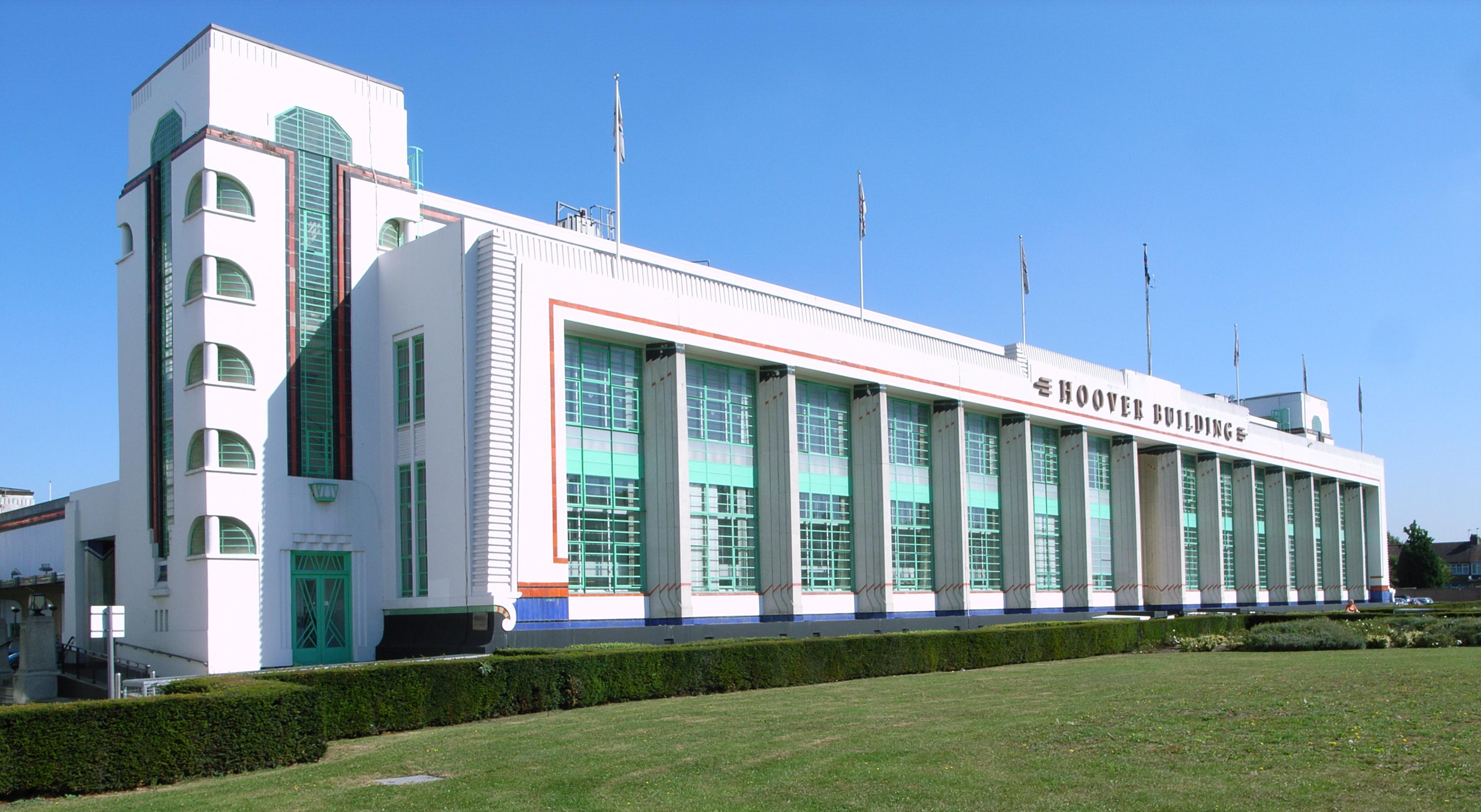
The Hoover Building (1933), one of London's most notable examples of the Art Deco and "Bypass Modern" industrial style

Two of London's finest examples of Art Deco architecture stand on Fleet Street: The Daily Telegraph building (1928) and the Daily Express building. The façade of the latter is, unusually for the time, composed entirely of glass, vitrolite and chromium, which stood out boldly amongst the stone and brick architecture of Fleet Street. The use of industrial, sleek materials like these was more common in Deco buildings in New York City than it was in London: Portland stone remained overwhelmingly the material of choice. For example, another media headquarters, the BBC's Broadcasting House on Portland Place, was built in the traditional Portland stone with outstanding figural sculptures by Eric Gill. Ideal House (1929), is highly unusual in combining Art Deco with Egyptian motifs, on a façade clad in shiny black granite. Another Art Deco/Egyptian synthesis is the Carreras Cigarette Factory in Mornington Crescent.

The erection of ultra-modern Deco buildings often came at the expense of older architectural gems, some irreplaceable. Along the Embankment two large Deco buildings were constructed which continue to dominate London's riverfront profile. The elegant Neoclassical Adelphi Buildings, designed by Robert and John Adam and built between 1768 and 1771, were demolished to build the New Adelphi office building in the 1930s. Adjacent to the Adelphi, the grand Hotel Cecil (1896) was demolished to make way for Shell Mex House (1931), a 190 ft (58 m) high Art Deco office building which features London's largest clock.

Arguably the most prolific Art Deco architect in London was Charles Holden, who received a large number of commissions by London Transport, including arguably London's first skyscraper 55 Broadway (1929) and several tube stations built in a distinctive modernist/art deco style like Southgate tube station (1933). His other high rise commission the 19-storey Senate House, headquarters of the University of London, is the tallest Art Deco structure in London and was one of the tallest buildings in London when finished in 1937. It elicited, and continues to elicit, much criticism because it stands so tall and obtrusive amongst the modest Georgian squares of Bloomsbury. Evelyn Waugh described it as a "vast bulk...insulting the autumnal sky", while more recent critics have called it Stalinesque or reminiscent of the Third Reich. This association with totalitarian architecture was reinforced by the wartime rumour that Hitler wanted the Senate House for his London headquarters upon conquering Britain, and therefore ordered Luftwaffe bombers to avoid it during The Blitz.

== Post-War Modernism and Brutalism (1945–1980) ==
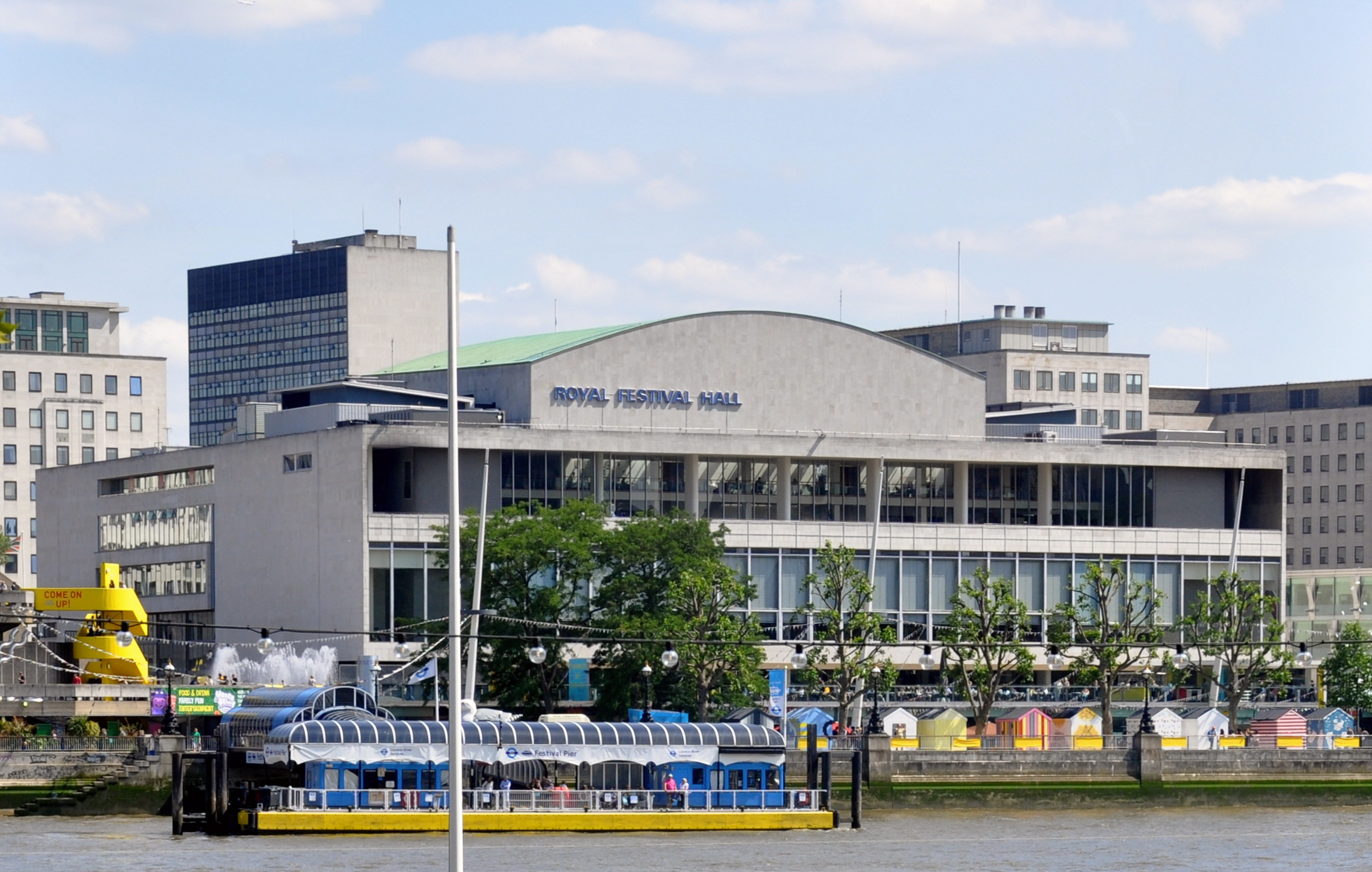
Royal Festival Hall (1951) by Robert Matthew

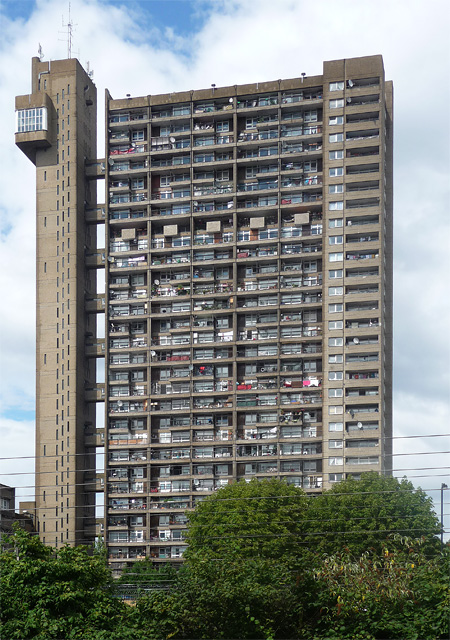
Trellick Tower by Erno Goldfinger (1972): brutalist social housing

In the Blitz, London's urban fabric and infrastructure was devastated by continuous aerial bombardment by the Luftwaffe with almost 20,000 civilians killed and more than a million houses destroyed or damaged. Hundreds of thousands of citizens had been evacuated to safer areas, and the reconstruction of a habitable urban environment became a national emergency. The re-housing crisis, aligned with post-War optimism manifested in the Welfare State, afforded an opportunity and a duty for the architectural profession to rebuild the shattered capital. The internationally influential urban planner Sir Patrick Abercrombie established the 1943 County of London Plan, which set out redevelopment according to modernist principles of zoning and de-densification of historic urban areas. Accelerating pre-war trends, overcrowded urban populations were relocated to new suburban developments, allowing inner-city areas to be reconstructed. The Golden Lane Estate, followed by the Barbican Estate by Chamberlin, Powell and Bon, are regarded as casebook examples of urban reconstruction of the period in the City of London, where just 5,324 local residents had remained by the end of the war.

The 1951 Festival of Britain, held on London's South Bank, became an important cultural landmark in sharing and disseminating optimism for future progress. The Royal Festival Hall (built 1948–1951) and the later South Bank Centre including the Hayward Gallery (1968), Queen Elizabeth Hall/Purcell Room (1967) and the Royal National Theatre (1976) remain as significant architectural and cultural legacies of the era.

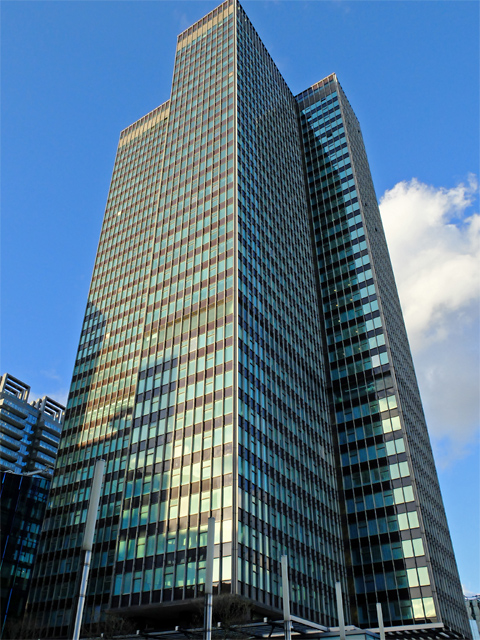
Euston Tower (1970): a post-war commercial high-rise in the International Style

London had attracted a select group of European modernists, some as refugees from Nazism, and the post-war era presented opportunities for many to express their unique visions for modernism. European architects of the era include Berthold Lubetkin and Ernő Goldfinger, who employed and trained architects on modernist social housing such as the Dorset Estate of 1957, Alexander Fleming House (1962–64), Balfron Tower of 1963 and Trellick Tower of 1966, as well as Keeling House by Denys Lasdun in 1957. International movements in architecture and urban planning were reflected in the new developments with separation of motor transportation and industrial and commercial uses from living areas, according to the prevailing orthodoxies of the CIAM. High-rise residential developments of council housing in London were above all else influenced by Le Corbusier's Unité d'habitation (or Cité Radieuse ("Radiant City") of 1947–52. The architecture of post war modernism was informed by ideals of technological progress and social progress through egalitarianism; this was expressed by humanistic repetition of forms and use of the modernist material par excellence – Béton brut or 'raw concrete'. Significant council housing works in London include the Brunswick Centre (1967–72) by Patrick Hodgkinson and the Alexandra Road Estate (1972–78) by Neave Brown of the Camden Council architects department.

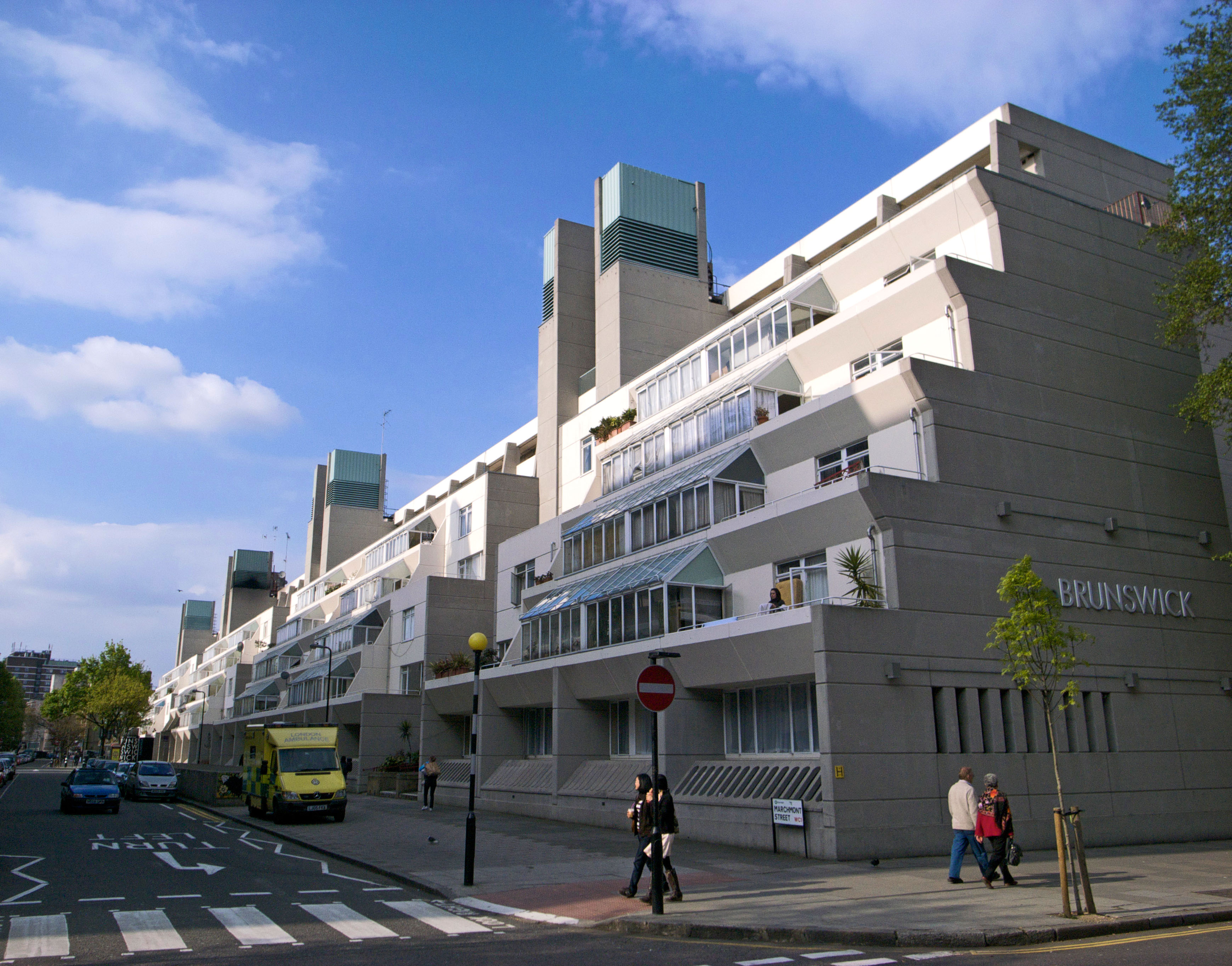
The Brunswick Centre (1972) a notable example of low-rise modernist housing in Central London

The British exponents of the internationalist movement were headed by Alison and Peter Smithson, originally as part of Team 10; they went on to design Robin Hood Gardens (1972) in Bow and The Economist Building (1962–64) in Mayfair, regarded by architects as some of the very finest works of British New Brutalism. Many schools, residential housing and public buildings were built over the period; however the failure of some the modernist ideals, coupled with poor quality of construction and poor maintenance by building owners, has resulted in a negative popular perception of the architecture of the era; this is being transformed and expressed in the enduring value and prestige of refurbished developments such as the Trellick Tower and Balfron Tower, regarded by many as architectural "icons" of a distant era of heroic social constructivism and highly sought-after places of residence.

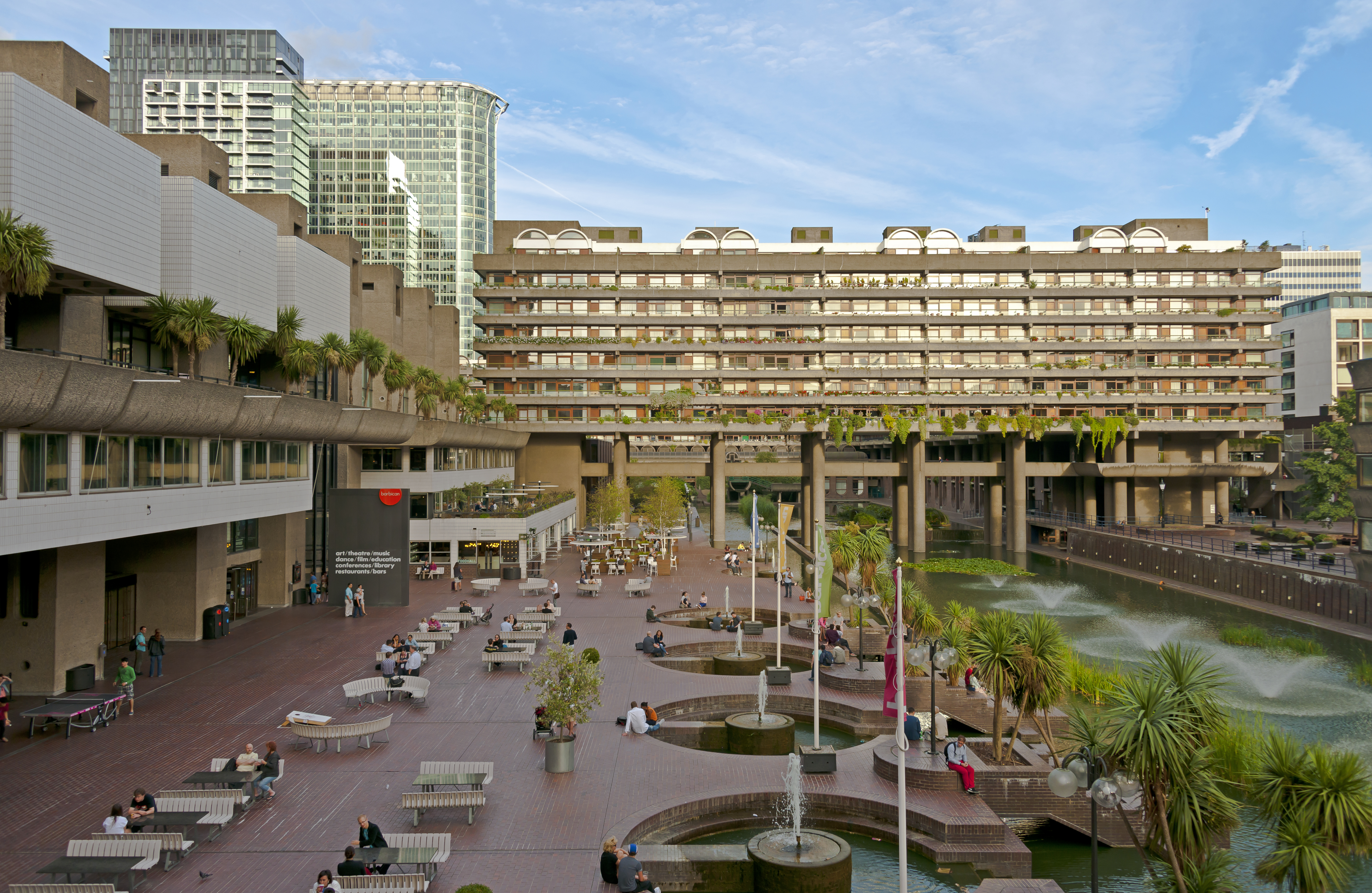
The central courtyard of The Barbican Centre (1976) complete with artificial lakes and fountains

The post-war redevelopment in Inner London, The Barbican Estate (1976), is considered a seminal work of brutalist architecture. This development is situated in the area formerly known as Cripplegate on the northern edge of The City of London, which was devastated by bombing during The Blitz. The new development by Chamberlin, Powell and Bon comprised not only over 2,000 flats, contained within several new tower blocks, but a complex of arts and entertainment venues known as The Barbican Centre, including a concert hall, theatre, cinemas and a library, situated on a large public space with artificial lakes and fountains.

The post-war period also saw the appearance of the first commercial skyscrapers in London. These were typically built in the corporate International Style, closely associated with the modernist pioneer Ludwig Mies van der Rohe, following the simple glass cuboid format of the epochal Seagram Building (1958). Examples include New Zealand House (1960), Millbank Tower (1963), St Helen's (1970) and Euston Tower (1970). Two high-rise office buildings built in the period were designed by the architect George Marsh: Centre Point (1966) and One Kemble Street (1968). Each has a distinctive façade made up of a mosaic of interlocking concrete blocks and large windows, creating an interesting blend of the International Style and Brutalism. They are both now Grade II listed in recognition of their architectural merit.

== Postmodernism, high-tech and high-rise (1980-present) ==
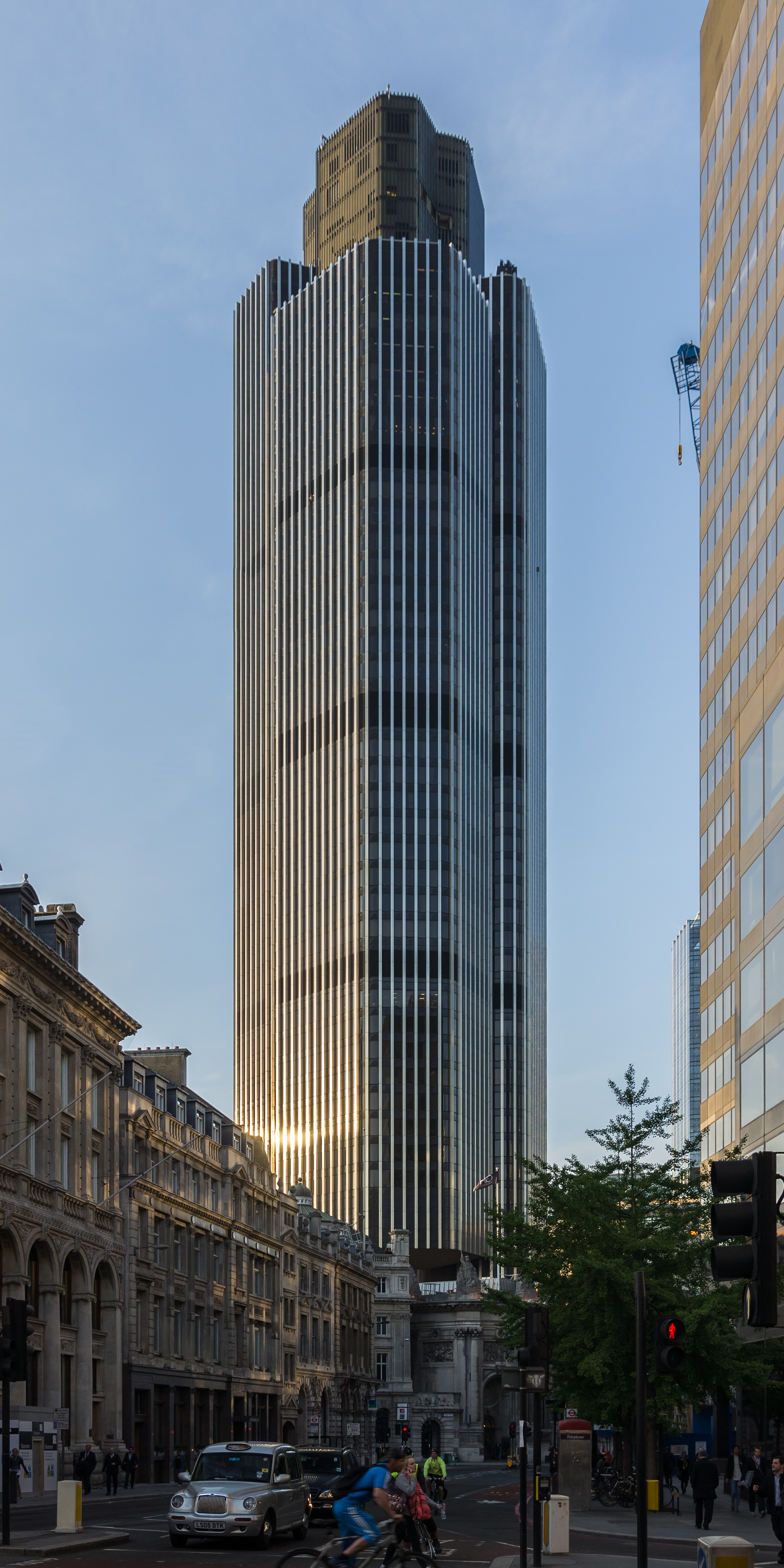
Tower 42 (The Natwest Tower) 1980, one of London's first true skyscrapers

During the 1980s, after decades of economic decline, urban decay and depopulation, the economy of London saw as a massive resurgence as The City of London became a global center for financial services. This economic resurgence was reflected in the cityscape and architecture of London, most notably in the widespread construction of high-rise office buildings. Many of these new office buildings were built in unusual high-tech and postmodernist styles, such as the highly influential Lloyd's Building (1986) by Richard Rogers, 30 St. Mary Axe (2003) by Norman Foster and The Shard (2012) by Renzo Piano, making London internationally notable for contemporary architecture, as well as dramatically changing London's cityscape. This demand for new office space also manifested in the re-planning of entire areas of the city, most notably the former industrial area of The Isle of Dogs being redeveloped into a new financial district known as Canary Wharf in the late 80s and early 90s, complete with its own light metro system: The Docklands Light Railway.

In contrast many former industrial areas like were regenerated via the retention and repurposing of their historic architecture, such as the conversion of the abandoned Victorian warehouses and industrial buildings in areas like The South Bank, Shadwell, King's Cross and even Battersea Power Station into apartment buildings, offices, commercial buildings and cultural spaces. This economic resurgence of London has also been mirrored by an increase in population, increasing from 6.8 million in 1991 to 8.9 million in 2002. This has created significant demand for housing, which has also largely assumed the form of numerous new high-rise buildings across Inner London. Other recent trends in London's city planning include the redevelopment of Stratford for The 2012 Olympics and large infrastructure projects like The Elizabeth Line.

=== Trends in urban planning and regeneration ===
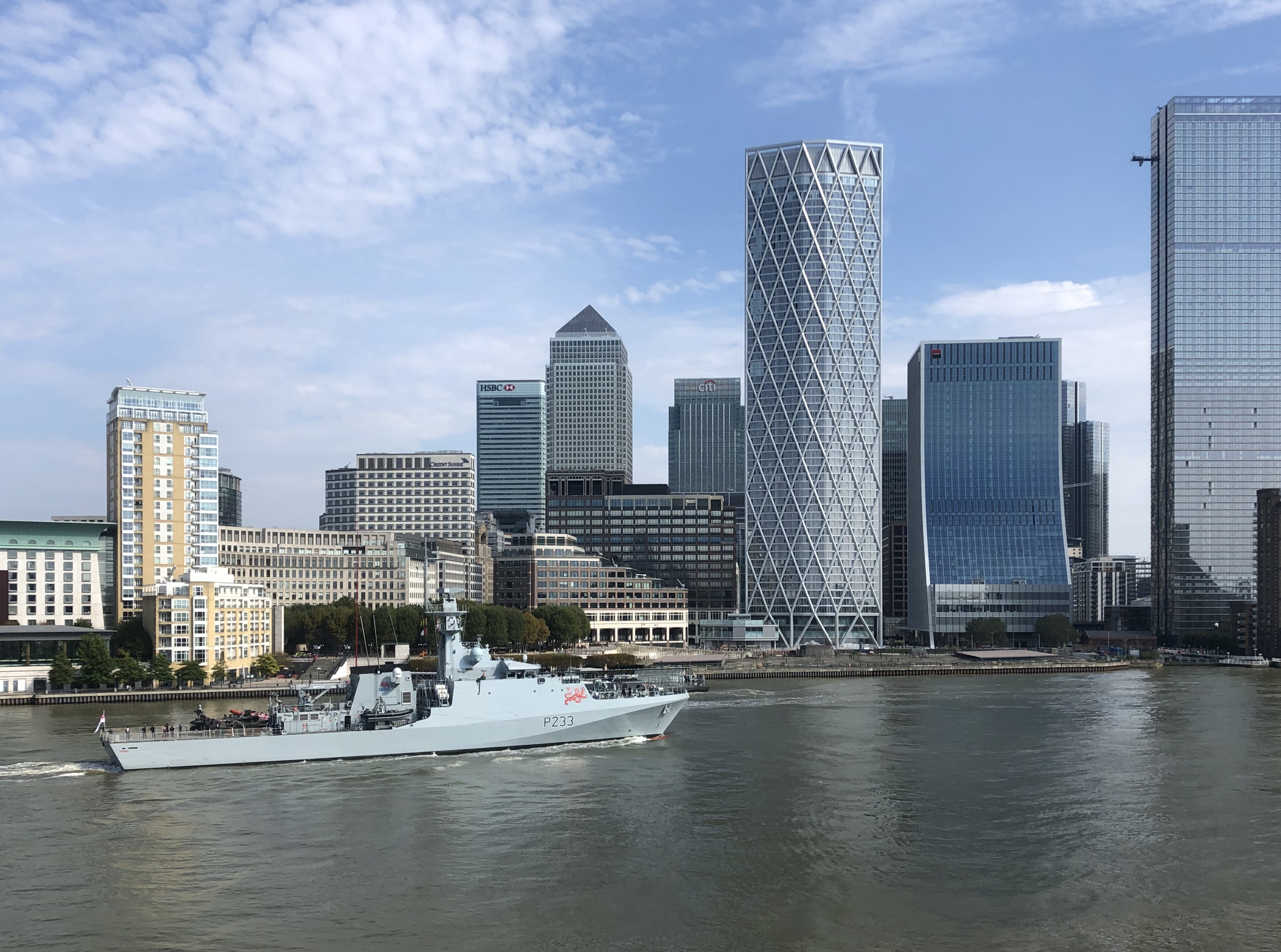
The Canary Wharf district in 2016, with One Canada Square in view. The redevelopment of this area set the trend for the regeneration of many former industrial parts of London.

With much of Inner London (particularly the areas lining The Thames in the east) being derelict by the late 1970s due to the decline of heavy industries and the use of London as a port, such areas became focal points for redevelopment from the 1980s onwards to cater for a rising demand for office space and housing. By far the most notable and extensive of these areas was the Isle of Dogs; a former shipping and industrial area. This area was extensively re-planned as a new financial district called Canary Wharf, comprising high rise office buildings, such as One Canada Square (1991) which was London's tallest building from 1991 to 2012, with many other high rises both commercial and residential being built in the area since: six of the UK's tallest buildings are now in The Canary Wharf Cluster as of 2025. This redevelopment also saw the construction of a new light metro system called The Docklands Light Railway (DLR), directly connecting the new financial district with The City of London, as well as areas of East and South-east London such as Greenwich.

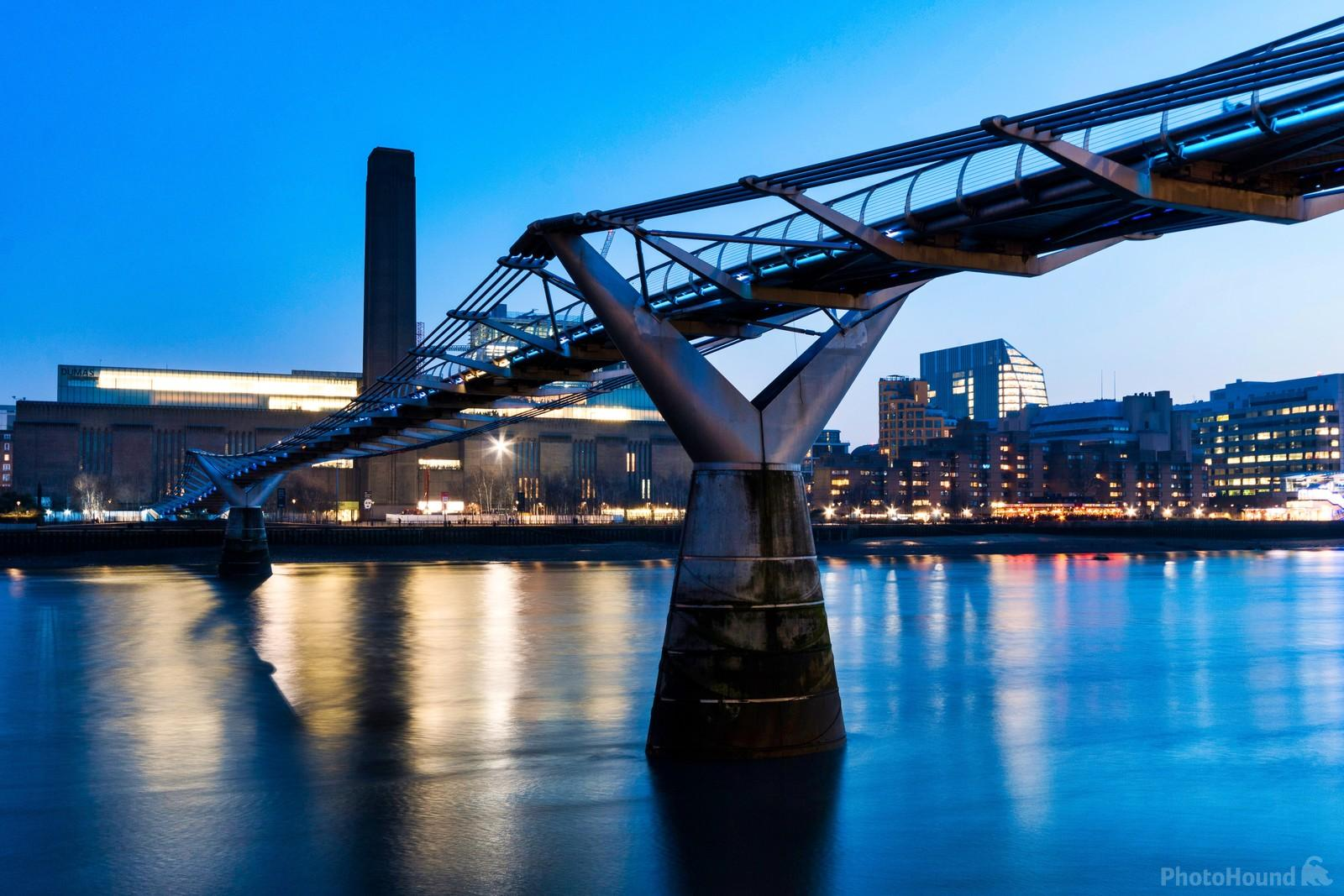
The Millennium Bridge (2000) and the repurposed Bank Side Power Station (Tate Modern).

Another former industrial area of Inner London that was dramatically redeveloped is the area now known as The South Bank. The redevelopment of this area took a very different approach to Canary Wharf, with many of the former industrial buildings being retained and repurposed. The most notable is the former Bankside Power Station (1948) being transformed into The Tate Modern in the year 2000, which is now one of world's most famous modern art galleries. This redevelopment was also accompanied by a new pedestrian foot bridge known as The Millenium Bridge (2000), which dramatically links The Tate Modern with St. Paul's Cathedral, as well as the now world-famous London Eye (2000). Combined, these developments dramatically transformed a formerly decaying industrial area into a new cultural centre, via a combination of retaining historic architecture and the construction of new modern structures which attempt to enhance and complement the appeal of the surrounding older buildings.

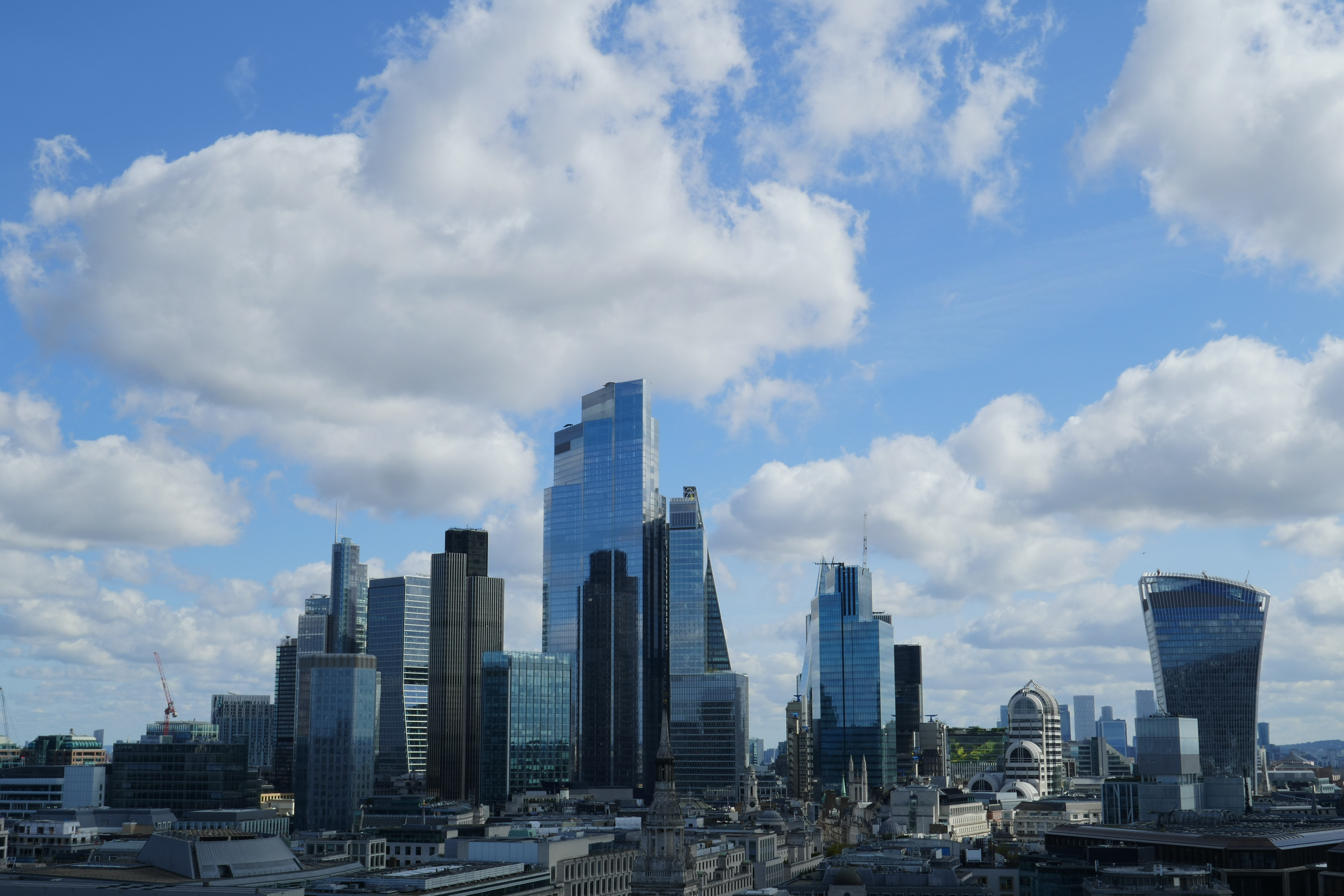
View of The City of London in 2024, illustrating the recent dramatic increase of high rise office buildings in Central London.

A similar approach to redevelopment has also been applied to areas like King's Cross. Formerly derelict railway buildings have been similarly repurposed, such as the Victorian warehouse at One Granary Square being converted into the main campus of Central Saint Martins in 2011, the recent Coal Drop's Yard Development (2018) has converted a plethora of former Victorian railways buildings into a luxury shopping district and several former gas holders lining The Regent's Canal have been converted into apartment buildings. A very In contrast, other major redevelopments such as that at Nine Elms have been chiefly orientated around the construction of new modern buildings. From the 2010s onwards, this area was dramatically transformed with the construction of several new high rise residential buildings, the tallest of which being One Nine Elms (2023) at 199 m (653 ft). This redevelopment also included the construction of a new American Embassy completed in 2018.

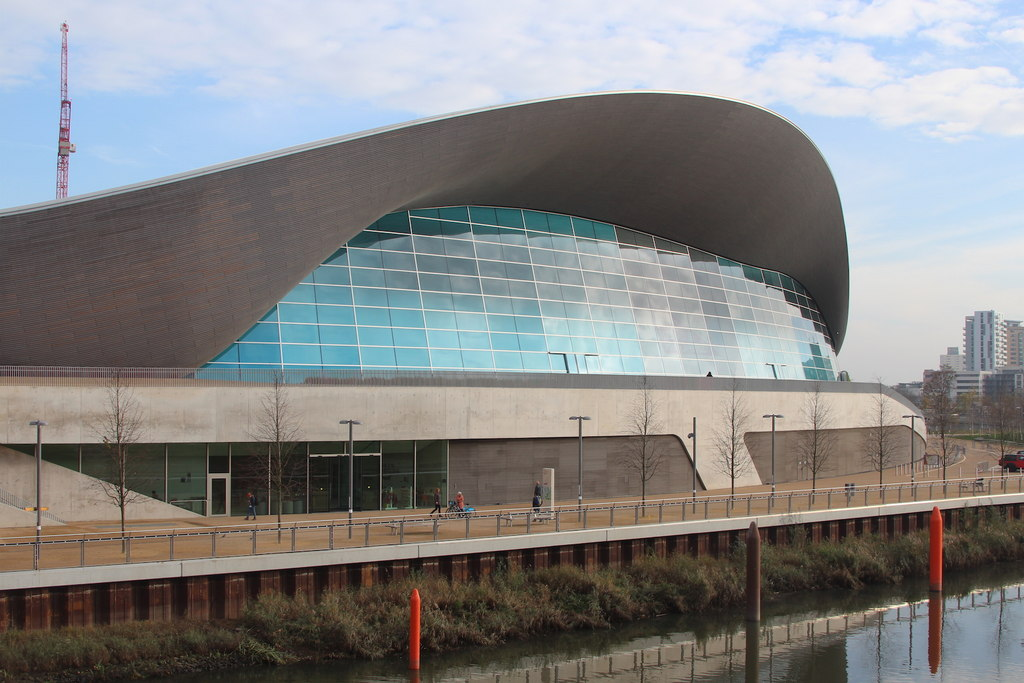
The award-winning London Aquatics Centre (2012) by Zaha Hadid built for the 2012 Olympics.

Such major regeneration projects have also taken place outside of Inner London. The most notable and extensive of these was in Stratford in East London, which became the focal point of The 2012 Olympics. The centre point of this was The Queen Elizabeth Olympic Park (2012), which includes a stadium now known as London Stadium with a seated capacity of 68,000, The London Aquatics Centre: a highly contemporary award-winning design by Zaha Hadid, a large area of residential buildings original used to house visitors to the Olympics that are now residential buildings. The areas of Stratford external to this sporting complex were regenerated with the construction of several high rise residential and office buildings, the construction of a new Westfield Shopping Centre and major upgrades to Stratford Station. The complex built for the Olympics has since been repurposed as a major sports complex, with the London Stadium now being the home of West Ham United.

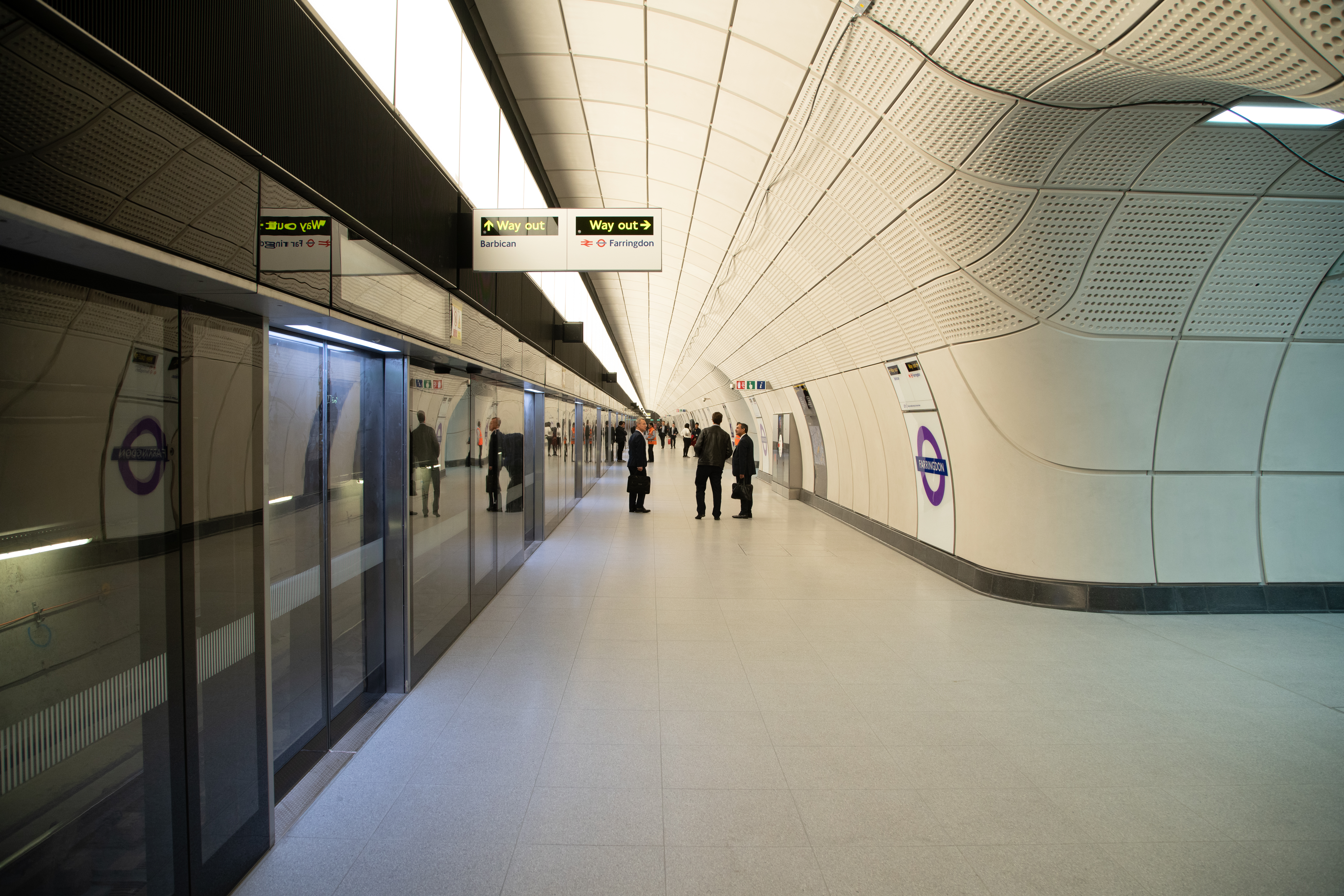
The Elizabeth Line platform at Farringdon (2022), built in a high-tech style by Grimshaw Architects.

Major new infrastructure developments in London have also greatly influenced the urban planning and architecture of the city. Many of London's old Victorian railway termini have been greatly upgraded, such as King's Cross St. Pancras which was saved from demolition and revitalised as the London terminus of HS1 and London Bridge Station where most of the station was rebuilt between 2009-2017, whilst attempting to retaining some of the Victorian station. However by far the most significant infrastructure development in recent decades was the construction of The Elizabeth Line; a partially underground light railway line which was intended to cut travel times from West to East London, as well as integrate areas as far aways as Reading and South-Essex into the underground network. Constructed between 2009 and 2022, the station architecture is built in a high-tech style by Grimshaw Architects and won the RIBA Stirling Prize in 2024.

=== Postmodern and high tech ===
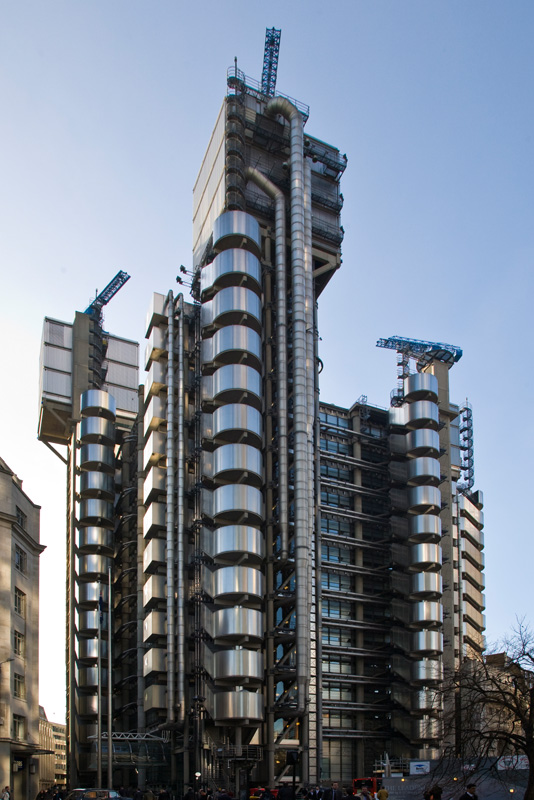
The Lloyd's building (1986) by Richard Rogers.

The late 1970s is considered to be a stylistic turning point in the history of architecture. Formed in reaction against the austere modernism which had dominated architectural design since the end of world war II, the postmodern school — which first expressed itself in the controversial book Learning from Las Vegas (1973) by Robert Venturi — was a movement that rejected minimalism by embracing irony, playfulness, pop culture and quoting historical styles in their buildings. The result was an eccentric new style that could not be in starker contrast to the rigid post war consensus of the international style. London has some postmodern architecture, mostly from the 1990s. Robert Venturi's Salisbury Wing of the National Gallery (1991) is a postmodern historical pastiche, built of Portland stone and ironically imitating the neoclassical style to blend in with the older building. Two of the postmodern movement's most influential architects, Terry Farrell and James Stirling, were British and many of their works are in London. Farrell's SIS Building or MI6 Building (1996) in Vauxhall is a distinctive pyramidal design influenced by Maya and Aztec architecture. James Stirling's No.1 Poultry (1997) has been commended as a masterpiece of the postmodernist style; it was grade II* listed in 2016. Its design incorporates a pink terracotta façade with equestrian sculptures and a clock tower resembling a submarine's conning tower. It replaced a neo-gothic building of the 19th century.

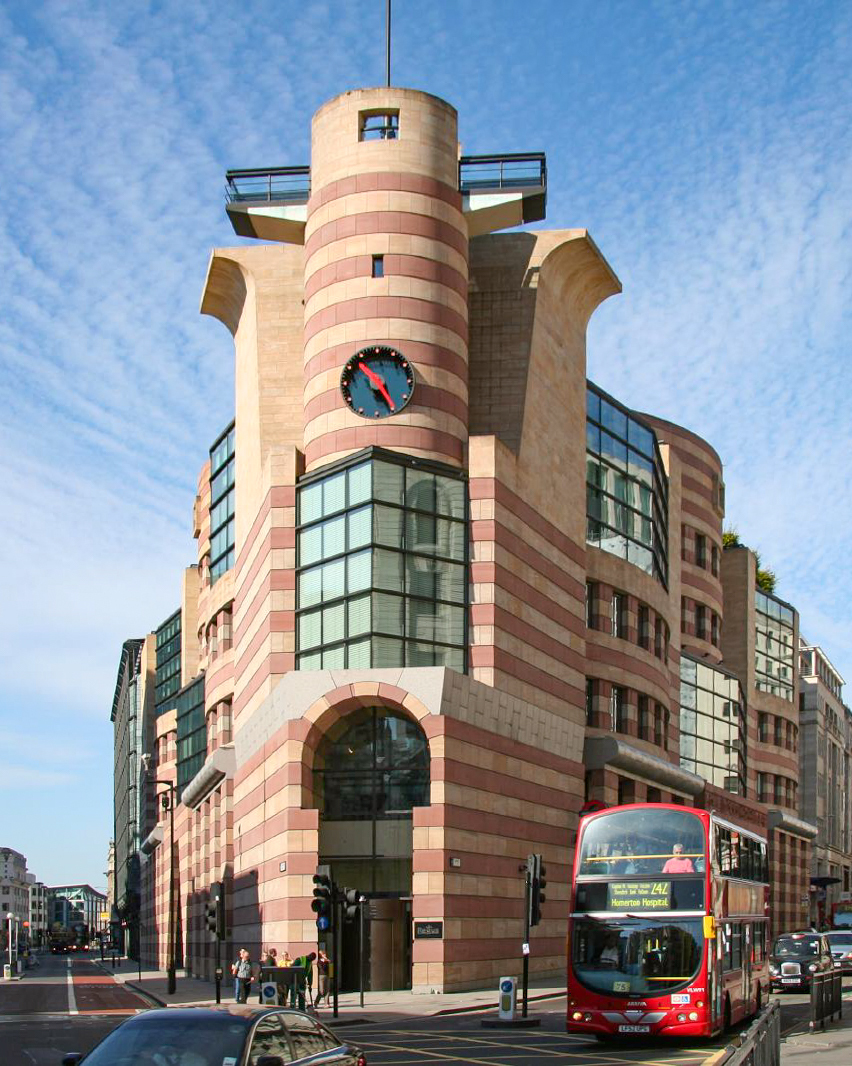
No.1 Poultry by James Stirling, an archetypal example of Postmodern Architecture.

A splinter of the postmodern movement that became prominent in the 1990s is the high-tech style and the similar neo-futurist style. These two styles embrace much of the eccentricity of postmodern style with unusual forms, whilst taking cues from the modernist movement with functionality and utopianism. In terms of construction there is an emphasis on the usage of glass, steel and high-tech production processes, as well as exposing the structural and utilitarian elements of the building as a means of decoration. A revolutionary example is the Lloyd's building (1986) by Richard Rogers, an 'inside-out' design in which all the building's utilities – its lifts, ducts and vents – are on the outside, acting as a façade. The building is Grade I listed. The high-tech became associated with Norman Foster. Significant high-tech works by Foster include The Great Court of the British Museum; a distinctive glass dome structure built over the central courtyard of the original 19th-century building, City Hall (2002) on the South Bank with its distinctive ovular shape and the iconic skyscraper 30 St Mary Axe (2003), dubbed 'The Gherkin', and winning the Stirling Prize and a 2006 poll as the most admired building by the world's leading architects. Many buildings followed suit, such as The Shard (2012), 122 Leadenhall Street (2014) 20 Fenchurch Street (2015) and 1 Blackfriars (2018).

=== Contemporary high rise ===
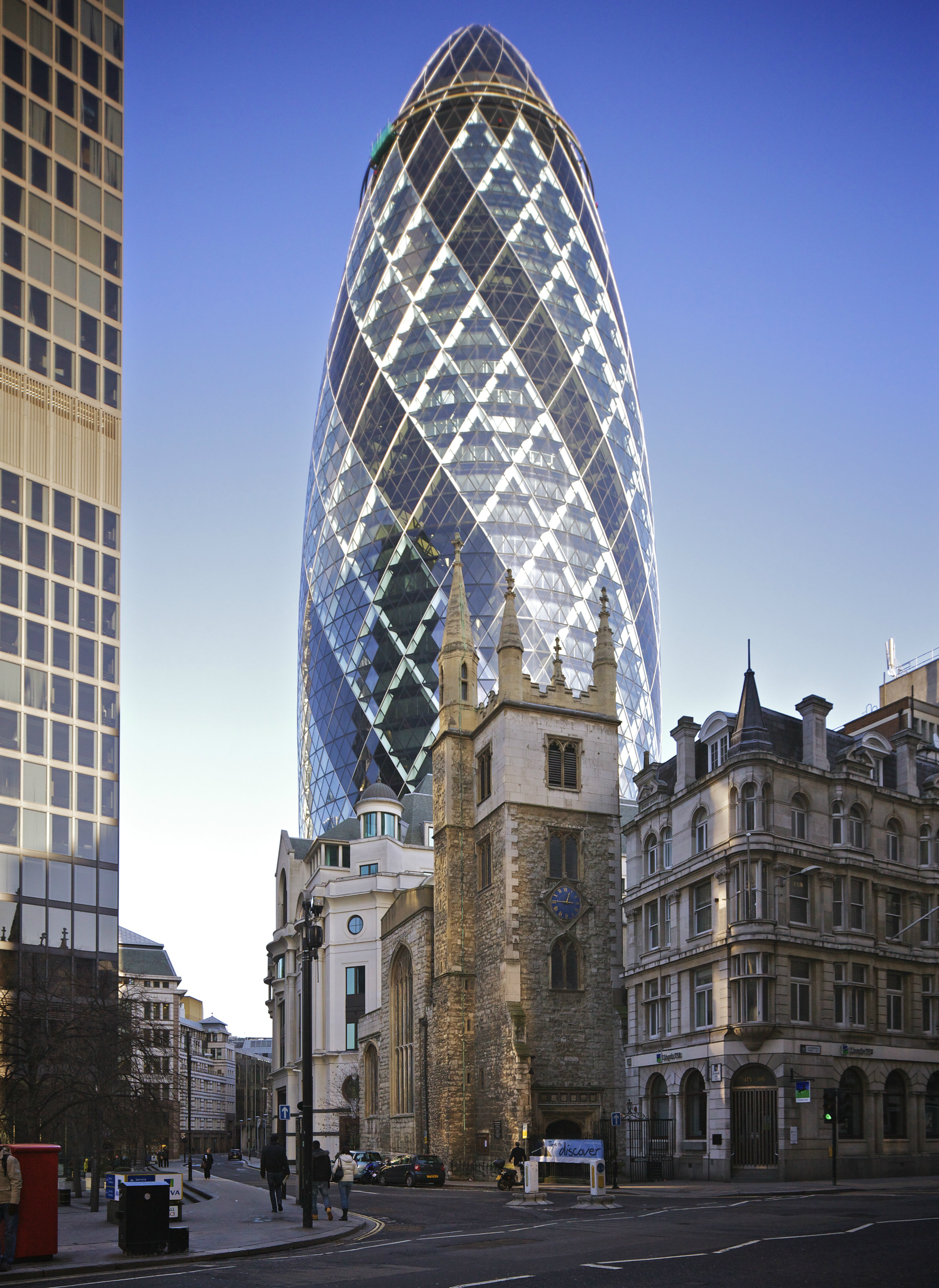
30 St Mary Axe (2003) by Foster and Partners ('The Gherkin'), an iconic high rise building

The NatWest Tower (now called Tower 42) was completed in 1980; at 183 metres (600 feet) and 42 storeys, it was considered the first "skyscraper" in the City of London. Its height was controversial, being contrary to the previous height restrictions; it was the tallest building in the United Kingdom at the time and the tallest cantilever building in the world. The redevelopment of The Isle of Dogs Canary Wharf One Canada Square was completed in 1991 at 235 metres (771 feet) and formed the centrepiece of the Canary Wharf development. The development's main tower One Canada Square became the tallest building in the United Kingdom.

With the encouragement of Ken Livingstone, Mayor of London from 2000 to 2008, a renewed trend for building tall was established. 8 Canada Square and 25 Canada Square, both standing at 200 metres (660 feet), were completed at Canary Wharf in 2002. In the City of London, Heron Tower was completed in 2007 at 230 metres (750 feet), and the Broadgate Tower in 2008 at 165 metres (541 feet).

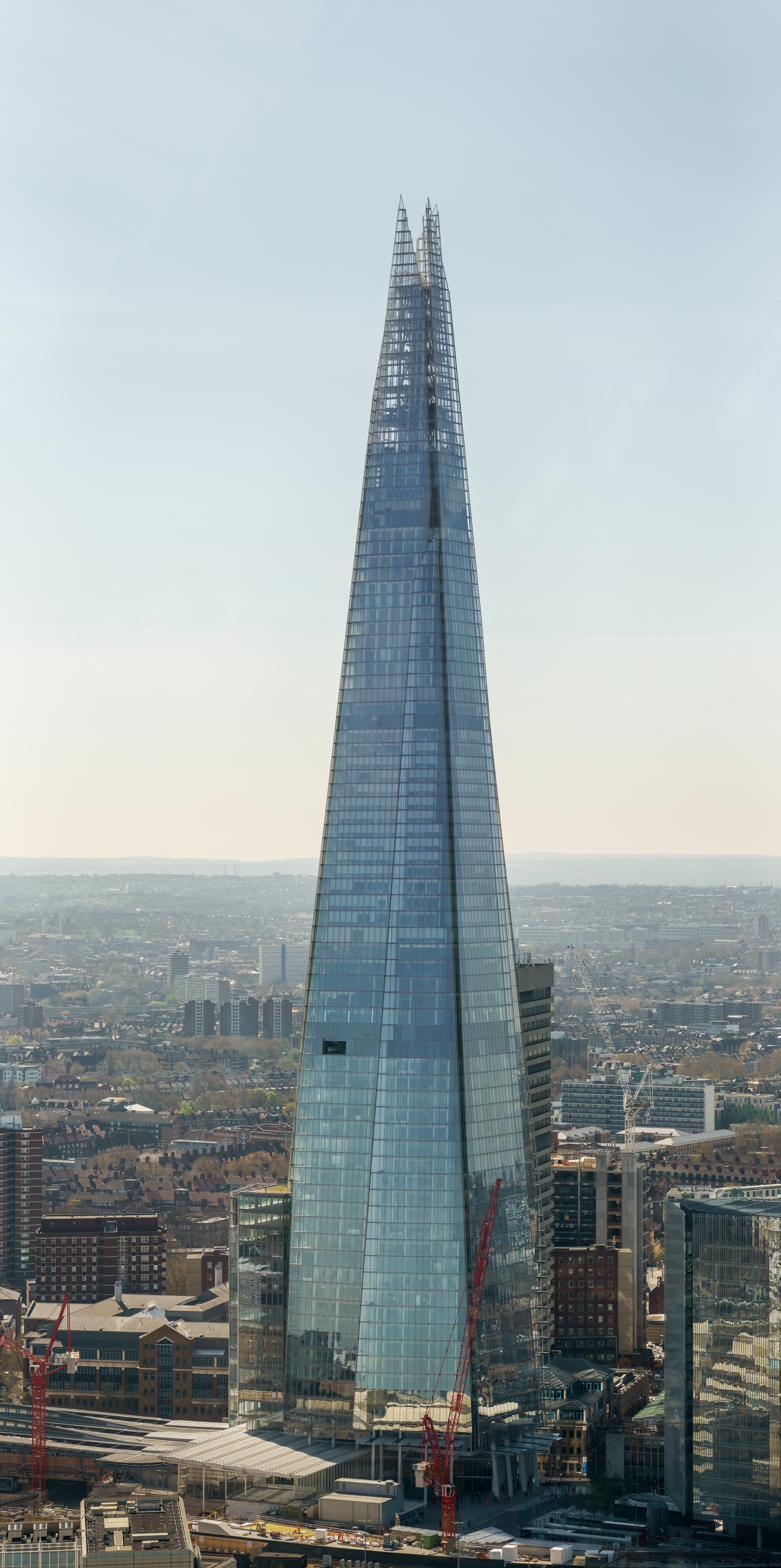
The Shard (2012) Renzo Piano, London's tallest building and the first to exceed1000ft.

Boris Johnson, Mayor of London from 2008 to 2016, approved more skyscrapers in London. The Shard, topped out in 2012 at 309.6 metres (1,016 feet),) remains London's tallest building. In 2014, the 225 metres (738 feet) 122 Leadenhall Street, nicknamed "the Cheesegrater", was completed in the City of London. In September 2016 a refit was completed of the 1970s 111 m King's Reach Tower, with an 11-storey height increase to bring it up to 150 metres (490 feet); it was renamed the South Bank Tower. One Blackfriars, also on the South Bank, topped out in 2017 at 163 metres (535 feet). The Scalpel, at 190 metres (620 feet) was completed in the City of London in 2018; it was designed to protect views of St Paul's Cathedral. Newfoundland Quay, at 220 metres (720 feet) and Landmark Pinnacle at 233 metres (764 feet) topped out in Canary Wharf in 2018 and 2019 respectively. One Park Drive at 205 metres (673 feet) and South Quay Plaza at 215 metres (705 feet) both topped out at Canary Wharf in 2019. 22 Bishopsgate, at 278 metres (912 feet) topped out in the City of London in 2019, after being approved by the current mayor of London, Sadiq Khan, in 2016.

1 Undershaft, at 290 metres (950 feet), approved by Sadiq Khan in 2016, is planned to form the centrepiece of the City of London's skyscraper cluster. It is the tallest skyscraper currently proposed for London and will only be exceeded in height by The Shard. It will be built on the site of the aforementioned 1969 St Helen's building which will be demolished. 100 Leadenhall, at 249 metres (817 feet), and already nicknamed the "Cheesegrater 2", is planned for the City of London. Spire London, at 235 metres (771 feet) is planned for Canary Wharf. However, construction was halted after concerns that the building only had one escape stairwell for residents on the upper floors. The tallest of the two Riverside South towers that have been planned for construction at Canary Wharf since 2008 would have exceeded that cluster's tallest building, One Canada Square, by 1 metre in height, but construction has been stalled since 2011. Construction has started on the 216 metres (709 feet) tall Consort Place (previously called Alpha Square) at Canary Wharf. Another major skyscraper cluster has emerged in the Vauxhall and Nine Elms districts south of the river Thames. The first to appear here was the 2014 St George Wharf Tower at 181 metres (594 feet). The tallest tower planned for this cluster is the 200 metres (660 feet) One Nine Elms City Tower.

== See also ==
- List of tallest buildings and structures in London
- List of demolished buildings and structures in London
