= Bellperre =

Bellperre International
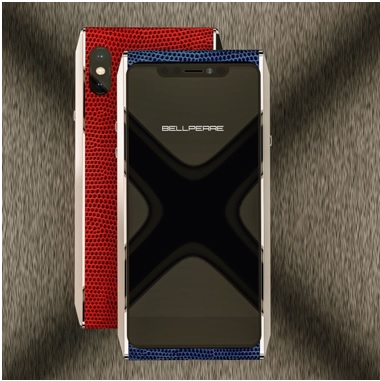
- Industry: Telecommunications
- Founded: 2005; 21 years ago
- Number of locations: Amsterdam, Netherlands
- Area served: Worldwide
- Products: Luxury mobile phones
- Website: bellperre.com

Bellperre is a mobile phone design company based in Amsterdam, Netherlands. The company incorporates leather and other high-end materials into its product designs.

Founded in 2005, Bellperre introduced its first mobile phone in 2007 at the CEBIT technology fair in Hanover, Germany. The company is positioned within the luxury mobile phone market, alongside brands such as Vertu, Goldvish and Gresso.

Bellperre’s devices are manufactured without plastic components, utilising materials such as leather, stainless steel, gold, hardwood and sapphire.

== Partnership ==
Bellperre has partnered with Capi, an electronics retailer operating in airport and travel-related locations in 25 countries.

== See also ==
- Gresso
- Goldvish
- Vertu
