= List of Apple Inc. suppliers =

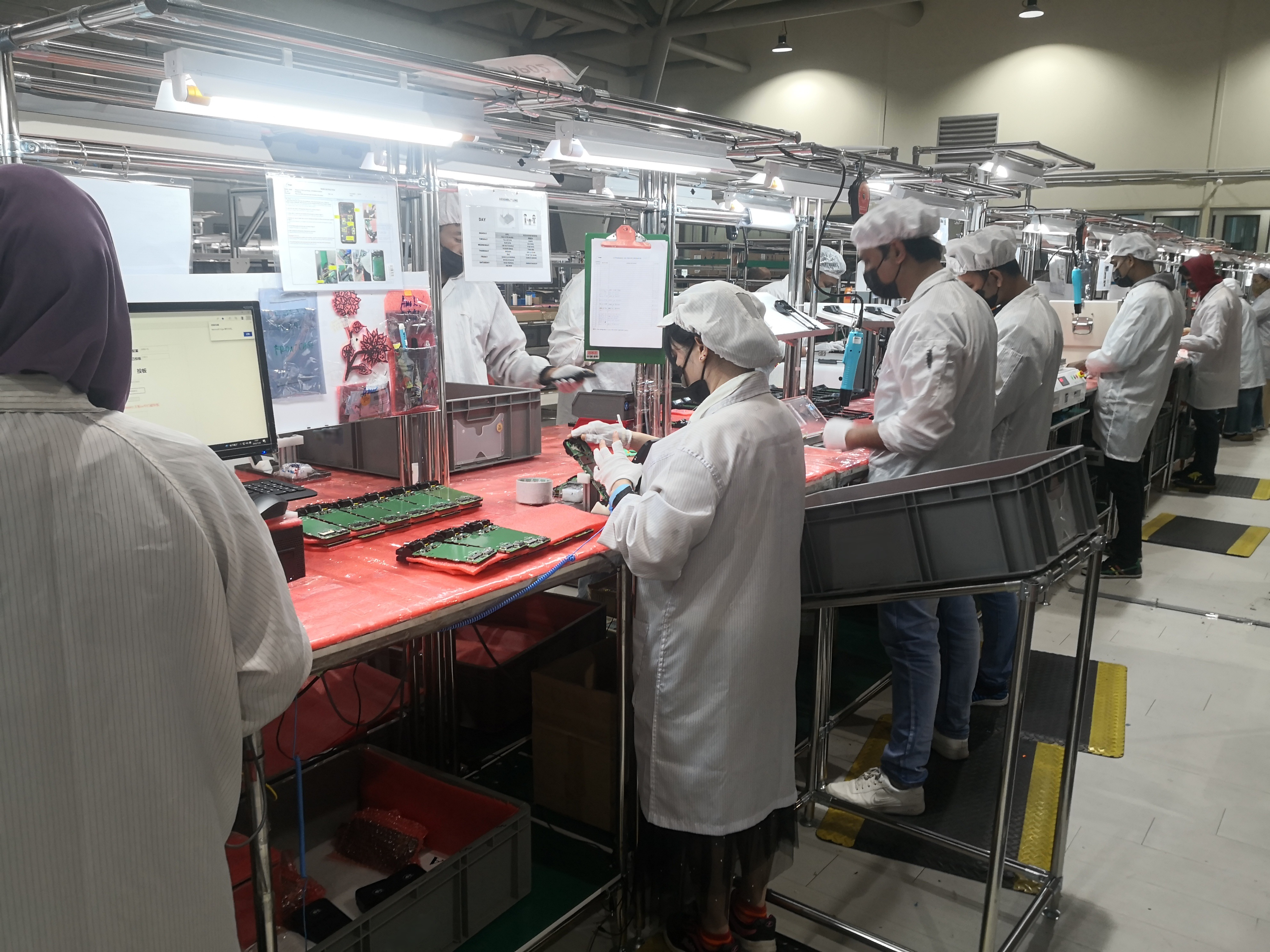
iPhone assembly line in India

Apple is an American technology company with a global supply chain. Until 2003, Apple's own factories in the United States, Singapore, and Ireland were involved in assembly. Although initially an advocate for production at these facilities, CEO Steve Jobs stated in 2005 that it "didn't work."

In 1985, Apple reduced its parts suppliers from 1,500 to 250 and closed down plants in Texas, Ireland, and California. In the mid-1980s, the LaserWriter was the first branded product designed by Apple to be manufactured by a third-party (Canon). After in-house issues with the Macintosh Portable, PowerBook engineering and manufacturing was outsourced to Sony. In 1994, Apple began interviewing manufacturers in Taiwan due to unfavorable economic conditions in Japan. Production for the Newton was shifted from Sharp to Inventec. South Korean firms, including Samsung and LG, worked closely with Apple as parts partners for the iMac, iPod, and iPhone before it increased its reliance on Taiwan and China. Taiwanese Apple suppliers such as Foxconn, Wistron, Pegatron, and Quanta established a sizable manufacturing presence in China. By 2019, Apple had more suppliers on their top 200 list from China than the United States. By the 2020s, orders were shifting to Chinese firms such as to Luxshare, BYD Electronic, Goertek, and Wingtech. By 2021, Apple's supplier list had more companies from China than Taiwan. But due to tariffs, labor costs, and the 2022 Shanghai lockdown, Apple and its suppliers diversified production "away from China to India, Mexico, the United States, and Vietnam."

Apple has exercised control over its suppliers (and related costs) by purchasing materials on their behalf, buying machinery for their facilities, and training their workforces. Apple has also threatened to penalize suppliers millions of dollars per leak to enforce confidentiality. Some supplier executives have opted for vague phrasing when discussing their relationship with Apple in public.

Apple released a list of its major suppliers for the first time in 2012. The list has generally been released in yearly intervals since. The following tables list suppliers and information about their operations related to Apple products.

== Final assembly ==
Company	Product	Reference
BYD	iPad	
Compal	Apple Watch	
Compal	iPad	
Foxconn	AirPods	
Foxconn	iPad	
Foxconn	iPhone	
Foxconn	MacBook	
Goertek	AirPods	
Goertek	Apple Watch	
Goertek	HomePod	
Inventec	Apple Watch	
Inventec	HomePod	
Luxshare	AirPods	
Luxshare	iPhone	
Luxshare	Vision Pro	
Pegatron	iPad	
Pegatron	iPhone	
Quanta	Apple Watch	
Tata Electronics	iPhone	

== Components ==
Company	Component type	Reference
Advanced Semiconductor Engineering	chip	
Amkor Technology	Apple silicon packaging	
Baotou Inst Magnetic New Materials	rare-earth magnets	
MinebeaMitsumi	LCD backlight	
Qorvo	radio-frequency chips	
TPK Holding Company	touch module	

=== Product lines ===
==== Apple Watch ====
Company	Component type	Reference
AAC Technologies	acoustic and haptic	
Broadcom	radio-frequency chips	
LG Display	panels	
Luen Fung Group	casings	
Nidec	motor	

==== iPad ====
Company	Component type	Reference
AAC Acoustic Technologies	acoustic and haptic	
Broadcom	radio-frequency chips	
Coherent Corporation	VCSEL lasers	
InnoLux	touch-screen	
LG Display Company	OLED panels	
SK Hynix	memory chips	
TSMC	Apple silicon chips	

==== iPhone ====
Company	Component type	Reference
AAC Acoustic Technologie	acoustic and haptic	
BOE Technology	OLED display	
Biel Crystal Manufactory	cover glass	
Broadcom	radio-frequency chips	
Catcher Technology	metal casings	
Coherent Corporation	VCSEL lasers	
Corning	glass	
Hi-P International	SIM card tray	
Hi-P International	volume-control buttons	
Jabil	aluminum housing	
Lens Technology	glass	
LG Display	OLED panel	
LG Innotek	camera modules	
Lumentum	lasers	
Murata Manufacturing	foldable circuits	
Nitto Denko	optical films	
NXP Semiconductors	NFC chips	
Qualcomm	5G modems	
Renesas Electronics	liquid crystal display chips	
Samsung Display	OLED panels	
Sharp	screens	
Simplo Technology	batteries	
SK hynix	memory chips	
Skyworks Solutions	chips	
Solway	plastic	
Sony	image sensor	
Sunny Optical Technology	camera lenses	
TDK	batteries	
TPK Holdings	displays	
Taiwan Semiconductor Manufacturing Company	Apple Silicon chips	
Young Poong Group	RFPCB	

==== Mac ====
Company	Component type	Reference
Everwin Precision	Macbook chassis	
Taiwan Semiconductor Manufacturing	Apple Silicon chips	

==== Vision Pro ====
Suppliers of the Vision Pro have included Shenzhen Desay Battery Technology, Shenzhen Everwin Precision Technology, Lingyi iTech, Largan Precision, Genius Electronic Optical, GIS-KY, TSMC, Samsung Electronics, LG Electronics, and Sony Corp. SK Hynix was reportedly selected as the Vision Pro's DRAM supplier in 2023.

Company	Component type	Reference
Shenzhen Zhaowei Machinery	electric focus drive system	

== Accessories ==
Company	Component type	Reference
Cheng Uei Precision Industry Company (Foxlink)	cables	
Cosmosupplylab	iPad smart cover	
Delta Electronics	adapters	
Delta Electronics	chargers	
Knowles Corporation	microphones	

== Discontinued supplier relationships ==
Company	Product	Role	Reference
OFILM	iPhone	camera modules	
Imagination Technologies	iPhone	graphics processing unit	
Imagination Technologies	iPad	graphics processing unit	
Intel	Mac	processors	
Japan Display	Apple Watch	panels	
Japan Display	iPhone	display	
Samsung	iPhone	chip	
Wingtech	Mac Mini	manufacturing	
Wingtech	Macbook	manufacturing	

=== Discontinued product lines ===
Company	Product	Role	Reference
Asustek	iPod	manufacturing	
Canon	LaserWriter	manufacturing	
Chinon Industries	Quicktake	manufacturing	
Fujifilm	Quicktake	manufacturing	
Flex	Mac Pro	manufacturing	
Foxconn	iPod	manufacturing	
Inventec	iPod	manufacturing	
Inventec	Newton	manufacturing	
LG	iMac	manufacturing	
LG Display	iPod	panel	
Pegatron	iPod Shuffle	manufacturing	
PortalPlayer	iPod	chips	
Quanta	iMac G4	manufacturing	
Quanta	iPod Video	manufacturing	
Samsung	iPod	chips	
Samsung	iPod	flash memory	
Samsung	iPod	displays	
Samsung	iPod	processors	
Sharp	Newton	manufacturing	
Sony	iBook	batteries	
Sony	Powerbook	batteries	
Sony	Powerbook	manufacturing	
Synaptics	iPod	scrolling wheel	

== See also ==
- Criticism of Apple Inc.#Contract manufacturers
