= Department for Business, Energy and Industrial Strategy =

Defunct department of the UK Government

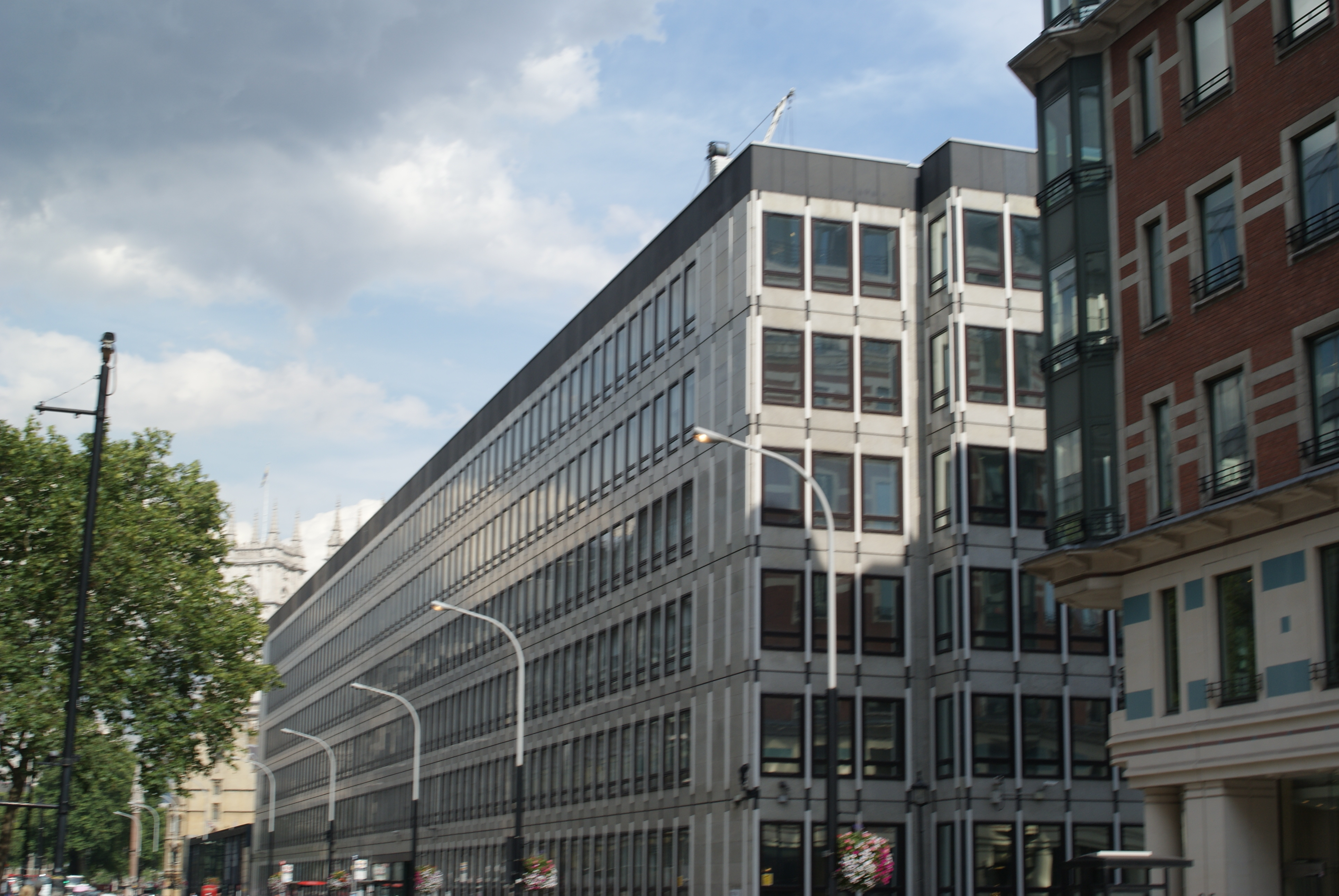
- 1, Victoria Street, London

Department overview
- Formed: 14 July 2016
- Preceding agencies: Department for Business, Innovation and Skills; Department of Energy and Climate Change
- Dissolved: 7 February 2023
- Superseding agencies: Department for Business and Trade; Department for Energy Security and Net Zero; Department for Science, Innovation and Technology
- Jurisdiction: Government of the United Kingdom
- Headquarters: 1, Victoria Street, London
- Annual budget: £13.8 billion (current) in 2016–17
- Minister responsible: Secretary of State for Business, Energy and Industrial Strategy
- Department executive: Permanent Secretary
- Child agencies: Companies House; HM Land Registry; Insolvency Service; Intellectual Property Office; Met Office
- Website: gov.uk/beis

The Department for Business, Energy, and Industrial Strategy (BEIS) was a ministerial department of the United Kingdom Government, from July 2016 to February 2023.

The department was formed during a machinery of government change on 14 July 2016, following Theresa May's appointment as Prime Minister. It was created by a merger between the Department for Business, Innovation, and Skills and the Department of Energy and Climate Change.

On 7 February 2023, under the Rishi Sunak premiership, the department was dissolved. Its functions were split into three new departments: the Department for Business and Trade, the Department for Energy Security and Net Zero, and the Department for Science, Innovation, and Technology. Grant Shapps, the final secretary of state for the old department, became the first Secretary of State for Energy Security and Net Zero.

== Responsibilities ==
The department had responsibility for:

- business
- industrial strategy
- science, research, and innovation
- deregulation
- energy and clean growth
- climate change

While some functions of the former Department for Business, Innovation, and Skills, in respect of higher and further education policy, apprenticeships, and skills, were transferred to the Department for Education, May explained in a statement:

The Department for Energy and Climate Change and the remaining functions of the Department for Business, Innovation, and Skills have been merged to form a new Department for Business, Energy, and Industrial Strategy, bringing together responsibility for business, industrial strategy, science, and innovation with energy and climate change policy. The new department will be responsible for helping to ensure that the economy grows strongly in all parts of the country, based on a robust industrial strategy. It will ensure that the UK has energy supplies that are reliable, affordable, and clean, and it will make the most of the economic opportunities of new technologies and support the UK's global competitiveness more effectively.

=== Research and innovation partnerships in low and middle-income countries ===
BEIS spent part of the overseas aid budget on research and innovation through two major initiatives: The Newton Fund and the Global Challenges Research Fund, or GCRF. Both funds aimed to leverage the UK's world-class research and innovation capacity to pioneer new ways to support economic development, social welfare, and long-term sustainable and equitable growth in low- and middle-income countries. The Newton Fund built research and innovation partnerships with partner countries to support their economic development and social welfare and to develop their research and innovation capacity for long-term sustainable growth. The fund was delivered through seven UK delivery partners.

== National Security and Investment Act 2021 ==
In August 2022, BEIS blocked the sale of Pulsic Limited in Bristol to a company owned by China's National Integrated Circuit Industry Investment Fund. Pulsic is a chip design software company which makes tools to design and develop circuit layouts for chips.

In November 2022, BEIS ordered Nexperia to sell at least 86 percent of Newport Wafer Fab, the largest chipmaking facility in the UK, which it had acquired in July 2021. In 2018, a Chinese corporation by the name of Wingtech Technology acquired Nexperia.

== Devolution ==
Some responsibilities extend to England alone due to devolution, while others are reserved or excepted matters that therefore apply to the other countries of the United Kingdom as well.

Reserved and exceptioned matters are outlined below.

Scotland

Reserved matters:

- Business regulation and support
- Climate change policy
- Company law
- Competition
- Consumer protection
- Corporate governance
- Import and export control
- Employment relations
- Energy
- Energy law
- Export licensing
- Insolvency
- Intellectual property
- Nuclear energy
- Outer space
- Postal services
- Product standards, safety and liability
- Research councils
- Science and research
- Telecommunications
- Time
- Trade associations
- Units of measurement

The Economy Directorates of the Scottish Government handles devolved economic policy.

Northern Ireland

Reserved matters:

- Climate change policy
- Competition
- Consumer protection
- Import and export control
- Export licensing
- Intellectual property
- Nuclear energy
- Postal services
- Product standards, safety and liability
- Research councils
- Science and research
- Telecommunications
- Units of measurement

Excepted matter:

- Outer space
- Nuclear power

The department's main counterpart is:

- Department for the Economy (general economic policy)

== Ministers ==
The final roster of ministers in the Department for Business, Energy and Industrial Strategy were:

Minister	Rank	Portfolio
Grant Shapps MP	Secretary of State	Overall responsibility for the department; leading the government's relationship with business; ensuring that the country has secure energy supplies that are reliable, affordable and clean; ensuring the UK remains at the leading edge of science, research and innovation, this includes responsibility for: the UK's membership of Horizon Europe, the Advanced Research & Invention Agency, the Innovation Strategy and R&D People & Culture Strategy, the Office for AI, our European Space Agency membership; steel and metals, critical minerals and the maritime, automotive and aerospace sectors.
Graham Stuart MP	Minister of State for Climate	Net Zero Strategy; net zero (science and innovation); carbon budgets; low carbon generation; international energy; EU energy and climate; international climate change; hydrogen; carbon capture, use and storage (CCUS); nuclear; nuclear supply chains; smart systems.
Nus Ghani MP	Minister of State for Industry	Advanced manufacturing (including aerospace, Made Smarter, defence); OneWeb; automotive (including Office for Zero Emission Vehicles); infrastructure and materials (including steel, energy-intensive industries, chemicals, construction); industrial decarbonisation; professional and business services; retail, consumer goods and personal care; hospitality, weddings and nightclubs; economic shocks; supply chains; levelling up / regional growth; skills.
George Freeman MP	Minister of State for Science and Investment Security	Science and research (domestic and international); Horizon Europe membership; innovation strategy / science superpower; critical minerals and critical mineral supply chains; maritime and shipbuilding; life sciences (including vaccine production); space strategy (excluding OneWeb); technology, strategy and security; artificial intelligence (including the Office for AI); fusion; R&D people and culture strategy; research approvals.
Kevin Hollinrake MP	Parliamentary Under-Secretary of State for Enterprise and Markets	Small business, enterprise and access to finance; COVID-19 business support; business frameworks; consumer and competition policy; better regulation; Office for Product Safety and Standards; labour markets; recognition of professional qualifications; Groceries Code Adjudicator and Pubs Code Adjudicator; postal affairs; subsidy control; British Business Bank; EU issues, internal market implementation and trade (Commons lead); intellectual property; retained EU laws (Commons lead); Brexit opportunities (Commons lead).
Martin Callanan, Baron Callanan	Parliamentary Under-Secretary of State for Business, Energy and Corporate Responsibility	Lords lead on all BEIS business; Brexit opportunities; EU issues, internal market implementation and trade; devolved administrations; green finance; HM Land Registry; Ordnance Survey; energy efficiency; smart meters; fuel poverty; clean heat; Insolvency Service; company law (including Companies House); audit (including Financial Reporting Council); corporate governance and responsibility.

In October 2016, Archie Norman was appointed as Lead Non-Executive board member for BEIS.
