= IPhone hardware =

Physical parts of the Apple mobile phone

The iPhone's hardware is designed entirely by Apple Inc. in California. While Apple designs its own system-on-a-chip (SoC), including the CPU and GPU, final assembly is outsourced to manufacturing partners, primarily Foxconn and Pegatron, in countries like China and India. This model allows Apple to maintain strict control over its supply chain, intellectual property, and the final product's quality.

== Screen and input ==
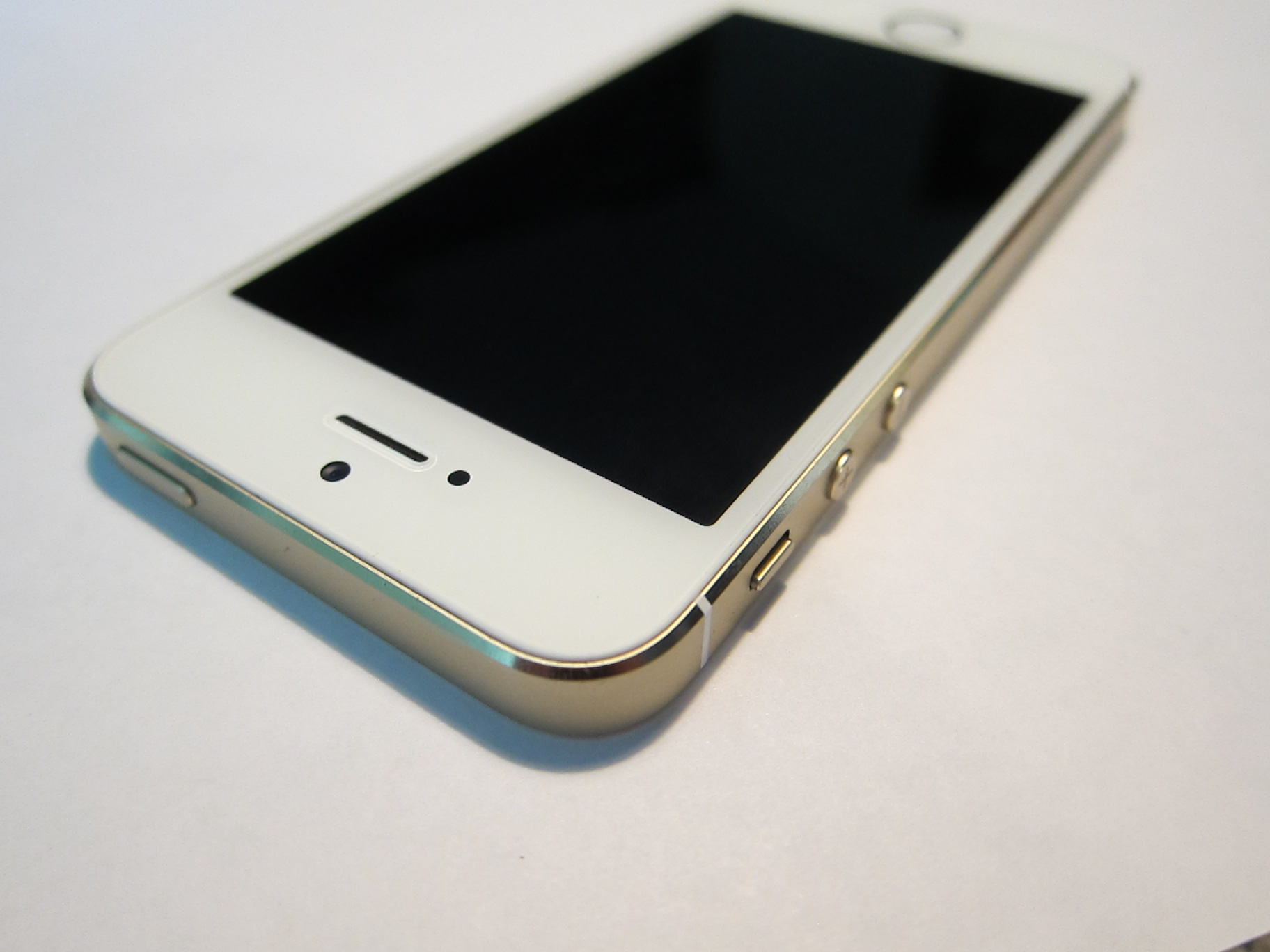
The top and side of an iPhone 5S, externally identical to the SE (2016). From left to right, sides: wake/sleep button, silence switch, volume up, and volume down.

The touchscreen on the iPhone has increased in size several times over the years, from 3.5 inches on the original iPhone to iPhone 4S, to the current 6.1 and 6.9 inches on the iPhone 16 and 16 Pro Max series. The touch and gesture features of the iPhone are based on technology originally developed by FingerWorks. Most gloves and styli prevent the necessary electrical conductivity; although capacitive styli can be used with iPhone's finger-touch screen. The iPhone 3GS and later also feature a fingerprint-resistant oleophobic coating.

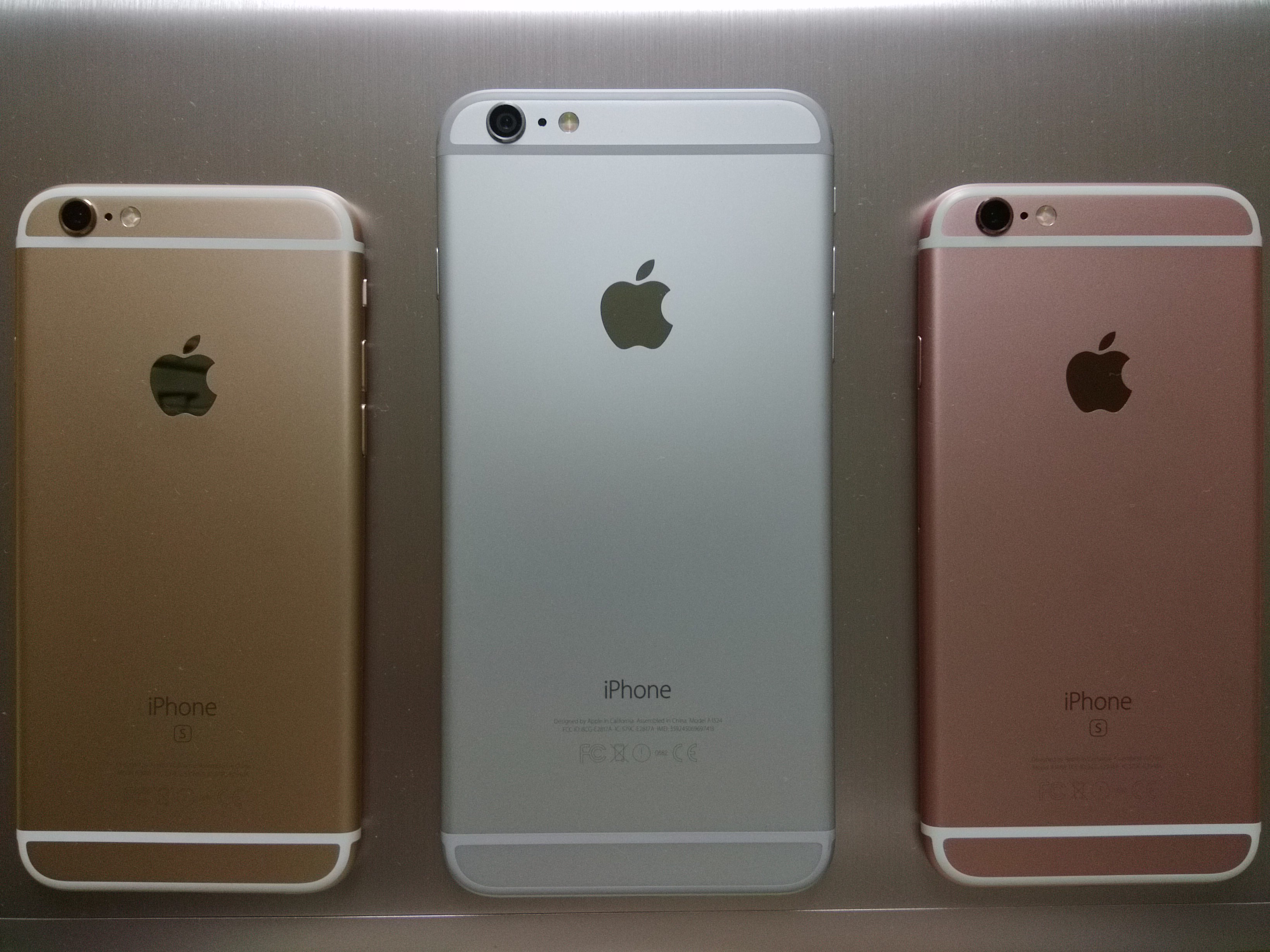
The backs of a gold iPhone 6S, a silver iPhone 6 Plus, and a rose gold iPhone 6S

The iPhone has a minimal hardware user interface, with most models featuring five buttons. The only physical menu button is situated directly below the display and is called the "Home button" because its primary function is to close the active app and navigates to the home screen of the interface. Earlier models included a rounded square, reminiscent of the shape of icons on the home screen. However, new models which include Apple's fingerprint recognition feature Touch ID (which use the Home button as the fingerprint sensor) have no symbol. The iPhone X and later, with the exception of the iPhone SE series, do not have a Home button, and include Face ID in place of Touch ID, a facial recognition authentication method.

A multi-function sleep/wake button is located on top of the device on earlier models, and on right of the device from iPhone 6 onwards. It serves as the unit's power button, and also controls phone calls. When a call is received, pressing the sleep/wake button once silences the ringtone, and when pressed twice transfers the call to voicemail. Situated on the left spine are the volume adjustment controls. The iPhone 4 has two separate circular buttons to increase and decrease the volume; all earlier models house two switches under a single plastic panel, known as a rocker switch, which could reasonably be counted as either one or two buttons.

Directly above the volume controls is a ring/silent switch that, when engaged, mutes phone calls ringtones, alert sounds from push notifications, and system sound effects. In later models, this has been replaced by the Action Button that can be used like the original ring/silent switch or programmed to perform a number of different actions.

=== 3D Touch and Haptic Touch ===
The iPhone 6S and 6S Plus, introduced in 2015, feature 3D Touch displays which allow the screen to recognize how hard it is being pressed using pressure-sensitive multi-touch technology, and a new Taptic Engine to provide haptic feedback. In addition to visual cues, 3D Touch uses the Taptic Engine to provide a tactile sensation relative to the force being applied to the display to indicate to the user that a light or deep press action has been completed. An example of how this technology was used is lightly pressing the screen to preview a photograph and deeply pressing to open it, a feature dubbed 'Peek and Pop' by Apple.

All iPhones starting with the iPhone 6s (with the exception of the first-generation iPhone SE and iPhone XR) had this feature. Starting in 2019 however, 3D Touch was omitted on all iPhones starting with the iPhone 11 and 11 Pro series, and its software features were removed from iOS 13 and later in favour of Haptic Touch. Haptic Touch retains much of the functionality of 3D Touch but cannot detect pressure, as the display lacks integrated capacitive sensors. Actions that previously required a deep press now only require a long press, and the haptic feedback is no longer associated with the applied pressure but rather the touch duration. iPad models that can update to iPadOS 13, along with the first-generation iPhone SE and seventh-generation iPod touch, which previously did not support 3D Touch, simultaneously gained similar Haptic Touch functionality with the iOS 13 and iPadOS 13 updates, although without any haptic feedback.

== Sensors ==
iPhones feature a number of sensors, which are used to adjust the screen based on operating conditions, enable motion-controlled games, location-based services, unlock the phone, and authenticate purchases with Apple Pay, among many other things.

The iPhone 17 series came out in September 2025, with Apple making further improvements to the devices. Standard iPhone 17 has a 6.3-inch OLED display with up to 120 Hz refresh rate, A19 system-on-a-chip and a 48-megapixel primary camera and ultra-wide camera. The iPhone 17 Pro and iPhone 17 Pro Max featured an aluminum unibody and a vapor-chamber cooling system to better support the sustained performance. The series was also the first to feature Apple's N1 wireless networking chipset, which supports Wi-Fi 7, Bluetooth 6, and Thread on supported models.

=== Proximity sensor ===
A proximity sensor deactivates the display and touchscreen when the device is brought near the face during a call. This is done to save battery power and to prevent inadvertent inputs from the user's face and ears. The iPhone's proximity sensors detect the ear and switches off the light, saving power and stopping the face from unintentionally pressing buttons. A phone case, dirt or grime, or a software problem may cause the proximity sensor to malfunction.

=== Ambient light sensor ===
An ambient light sensor adjusts the display brightness which saves battery power and prevents the screen from being too bright or too dark. True Tone, which is activated by default, uses advanced sensors to change the colour and intensity of the iPhone screen to match the ambient light, resulting in more natural-looking images. The ambient light sensor decides how much light is available around the iPhone and other Apple products, such as the iPod and iPad. The device changes the screen brightness automatically based on this knowledge to save battery life and minimize eye strain.

=== Accelerometer ===
A 3-axis accelerometer senses the orientation of the phone and changes the screen accordingly, allowing the user to easily switch between portrait and landscape mode. Photo browsing, web browsing, and music playing support both upright and left or right widescreen orientations. Unlike the iPad, the iPhone does not rotate the screen when turned upside-down, with the Home button above the screen, unless the running program has been specifically designed to do so. The 3.0 update added landscape support for still other applications, such as email, and introduced shaking the unit as a form of input (generally for undo functionality). The accelerometer can also be used to control third-party apps, notably games. It is also used for fitness tracking purposes, primarily as a pedometer. Starting with the iPhone 5S, this functionality was included in the M7 Motion coprocessor and subsequent revisions of the embedded chip

=== Magnetometer ===
A magnetometer is built-in since the iPhone 3GS, which is used to measure the strength and direction of the magnetic field in the vicinity of the device. Sometimes certain devices or radio signals can interfere with the magnetometer requiring users to either move away from the interference or re-calibrate by moving the device in a figure-eight motion. Since the iPhone 3GS, the iPhone also features a Compass app, which was unique at time of release, showing a compass that points in the direction of the magnetic field.

=== Gyroscopic sensor ===
Since the iPhone 4, the 4th Generation iPod touch, and the iPad 2, a three-axis gyroscope was included. This sensor will run on six axes due to the combination of a gyroscope and an accelerometer. One of the main reasons of the implementation was to enhance gaming mechanics such as the sensitivity and responsiveness aspects. It is compatible with iPhone, iPad, and iPod touch.

=== Radio ===
Some previous iPhone models contained a chip capable of receiving radio signals; however, Apple has the FM radio feature switched off because there was no antenna connected to the chip. Later iterations of the iPhone (starting with the iPhone 7), however, do not contain radio chips at all. A campaign called "Free Radio On My Phone" was started to encourage cellphone manufacturers such as Apple to enable the radio on the phones they manufacture, reasons cited were that radio drains less power and is useful in an emergency such as the 2016 Fort McMurray Wildfire.

=== Fingerprint sensor ===
Until 2017, iPhone models starting from iPhone 5S (excluding the iPhone 5C) featured Apple's fingerprint recognition sensor. It is used for unlocking the device and authenticating Apple Pay purchases (since the iPhone 6) using Touch ID. It is located in the home button. Touch ID has been replaced by Face ID (with the exception of the iPhone SE series), starting with the iPhone X. The fingerprint sensor uses the user's biometric information to give the user quick access to the device. It can also be used to open applications and approve transactions. It's compatible with iPhone, iPad, and iPod touch.

=== Barometer ===
Included on the iPhone 6 and later (excluding the iPhone SE (1st generation)), a barometer is used to determine air pressure and elevation. This sensor is used to provide position and navigational features by determining the altitude through evaluating air pressure. The barometers will allow the device to be pinpointed.

=== Facial recognition sensor ===
Starting with the iPhone X, a facial recognition sensor, named the TrueDepth camera system, is featured. It is used for unlocking the device and for authenticating purchases using Face ID. It can also be used for Animojis and AR. Now Apple added a feature making it so it checks if you are paying attention, in order to unlock or use Face ID. Also allowing it so you can lock apps with Face ID.

== Audio and output ==
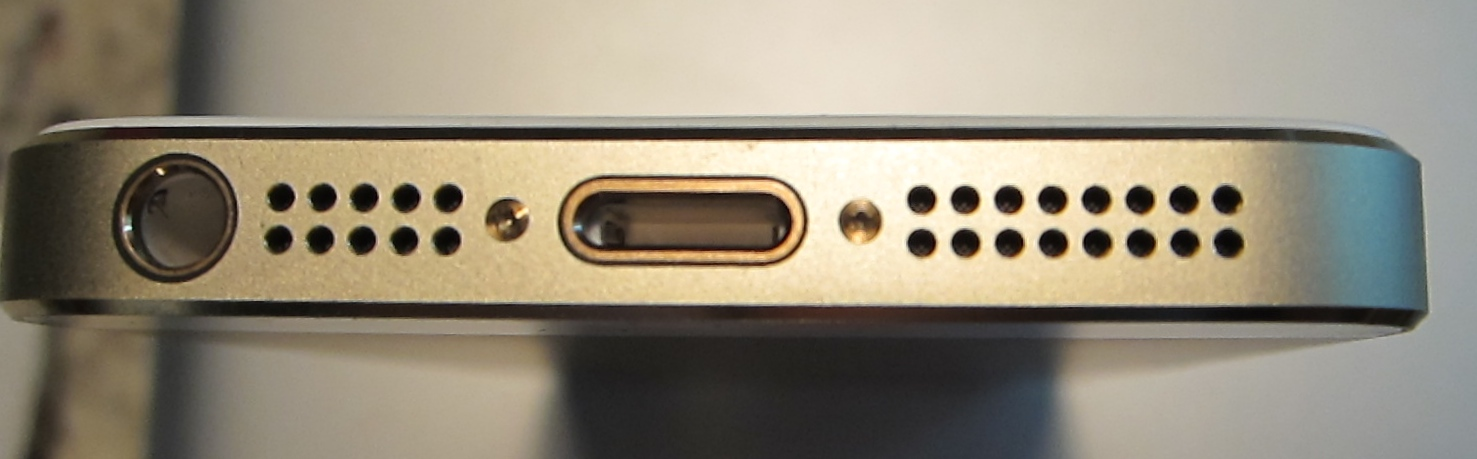
From left to right is the headphone jack, microphone, Lightning connector, and built-in speaker on the base of the iPhone 5S.

On the bottom of the iPhone, there is a speaker to the left of the dock connector and a microphone to the right. iPhone models from the first-generation to iPhone 4S utilize the 30-pin dock connector, while the models from iPhone 5 to iPhone 14 use the proprietary Lightning connector.

There is an additional loudspeaker above the screen that serves as an earpiece during phone calls. The iPhone 4 includes an additional microphone at the top of the unit for noise cancellation, and switches the placement of the microphone and speaker on the base on the unit—the speaker is on the right. Volume controls are located on the left side of all iPhone models and as a slider in the iPod application.

The 3.5 mm headphone jack was located either on the top left corner or to the bottom left corner of the iPhone. The headphone socket on the first-generation iPhone is recessed into the casing, making it incompatible with most headsets without the use of an adapter. The iPhone 7 and later have no 3.5 mm headphone jack, and instead headsets must connect to the iPhone by Bluetooth, use Apple's Lightning connector, or (for traditional headsets) use the Lightning to 3.5 mm headphone jack adapter. This adapter was included on several models of iPhone, and is also available for purchase at several leading retailers. Beginning with the iPhone 15 series, the Lightning connector was replaced with a USB-C connector, therefore requiring that the headset use the aforementioned connector, or connect via a USB-C to 3.5 mm headphone jack adapter, such as Apple's.

The built-in Bluetooth 2.x+EDR supports wireless earpieces and headphones, which requires the HSP profile. Stereo audio was added in the 3.0 update for hardware that supports A2DP. While non-sanctioned third-party solutions exist, the iPhone does not officially support the OBEX file transfer protocol. The lack of these profiles prevents iPhone users from exchanging multimedia files, such as pictures, music and videos, with other Bluetooth-enabled cell phones.

Mirrored display output is supported via a HDMI adapter, connected to the iPhone Lightning connector.

== Battery ==
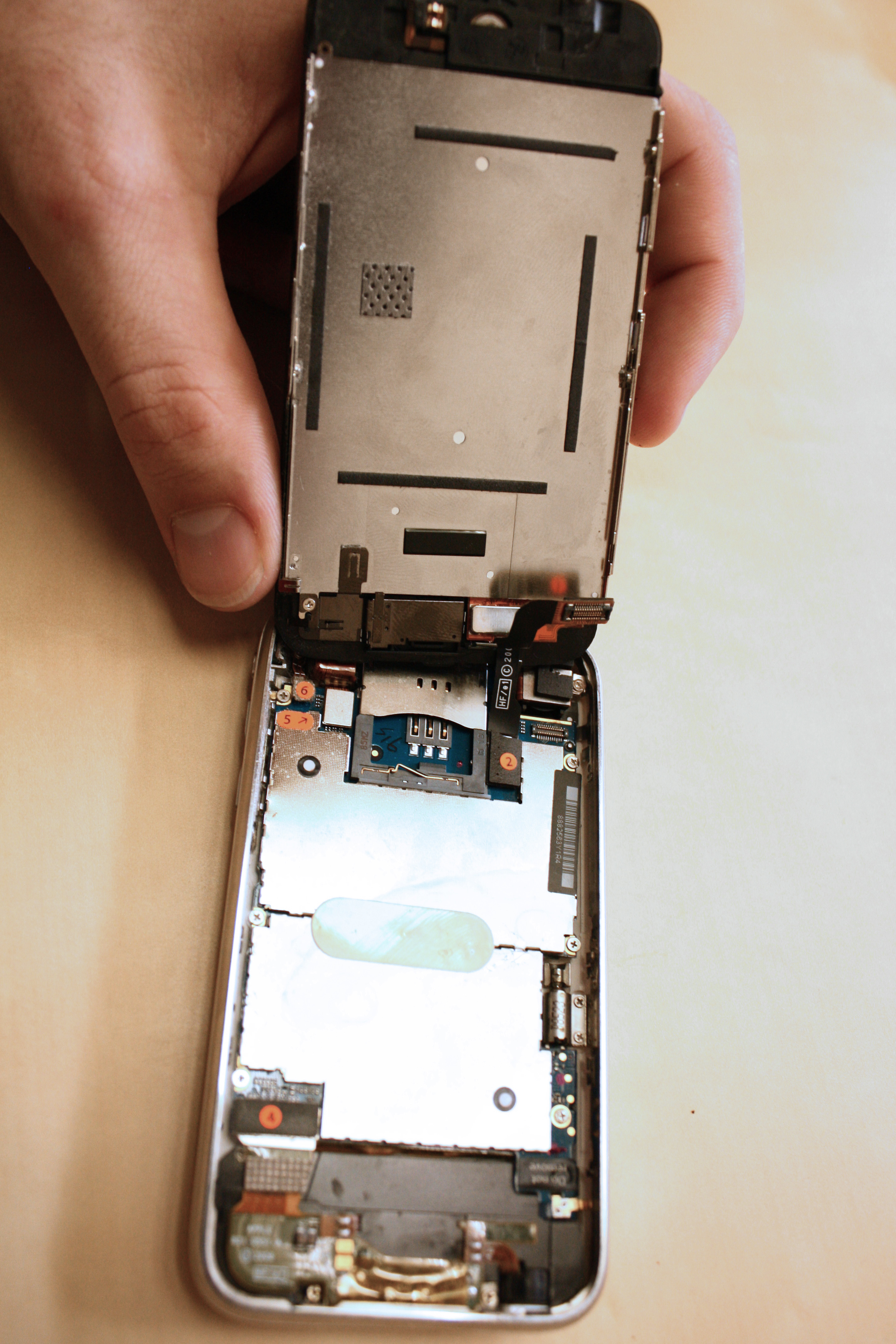
Replacing the battery requires disassembling the iPhone unit and exposing the internal hardware.

The iPhone features an internal rechargeable lithium-ion battery. Like an iPod, but unlike most other mobile phones at the time of its launch, the battery is not user-replaceable. The iPhone can be charged when connected to a computer for syncing across the included USB to dock connector cable, similar to charging an iPod. Alternatively, a USB to AC adapter (or "wall charger", also included) can be connected to the cable to charge directly from an AC outlet. Some models of the iPhone support wireless charging. A distinction to Android devices is that connecting an iPhone to a charger while powered off causes it to power on rather than showing a battery indicator without booting.

Apple runs tests on preproduction units to determine battery life. Apple's website says that the battery life "is designed to retain up to 80% of its original capacity after 500 complete charge cycles".

The battery life of early models of the iPhone has been criticized by several technology journalists as insufficient and less than Apple's claims. This is also reflected by a J. D. Power and Associates customer satisfaction survey, which gave the "battery aspects" of the iPhone 3G its lowest rating of two out of five stars.

If the battery malfunctions or dies prematurely, the phone can be returned to Apple and replaced for free while still under warranty. The warranty lasts one year from purchase and can be extended to two years with AppleCare. The battery replacement service and its pricing was not made known to buyers until the day the product was launched; it is similar to how Apple (and third parties) replace batteries for iPods. The Foundation for Taxpayer and Consumer Rights, a consumer advocate group, has sent a complaint to Apple and AT&T over the fee that consumers have to pay to have the battery replaced.

Since iOS 10.2.1, Apple has instituted a policy of employing "performance management" techniques (including CPU throttling) on iPhone devices whose batteries are degraded, in order to maintain device stability and prolong their lifespan. These changes came in the wake of reported issues with unexpected shutdowns on certain iPhone models following the release of iOS 10.1.1. In response to criticism over the practice, including concerns over this being a form of planned obsolescence, Apple announced that it would offer discounted battery replacements for iPhone 6 and newer in 2018, and that it would add additional battery health information on a future version of iOS (iOS 11.3, which also allows users to disable this throttling).

== Camera ==
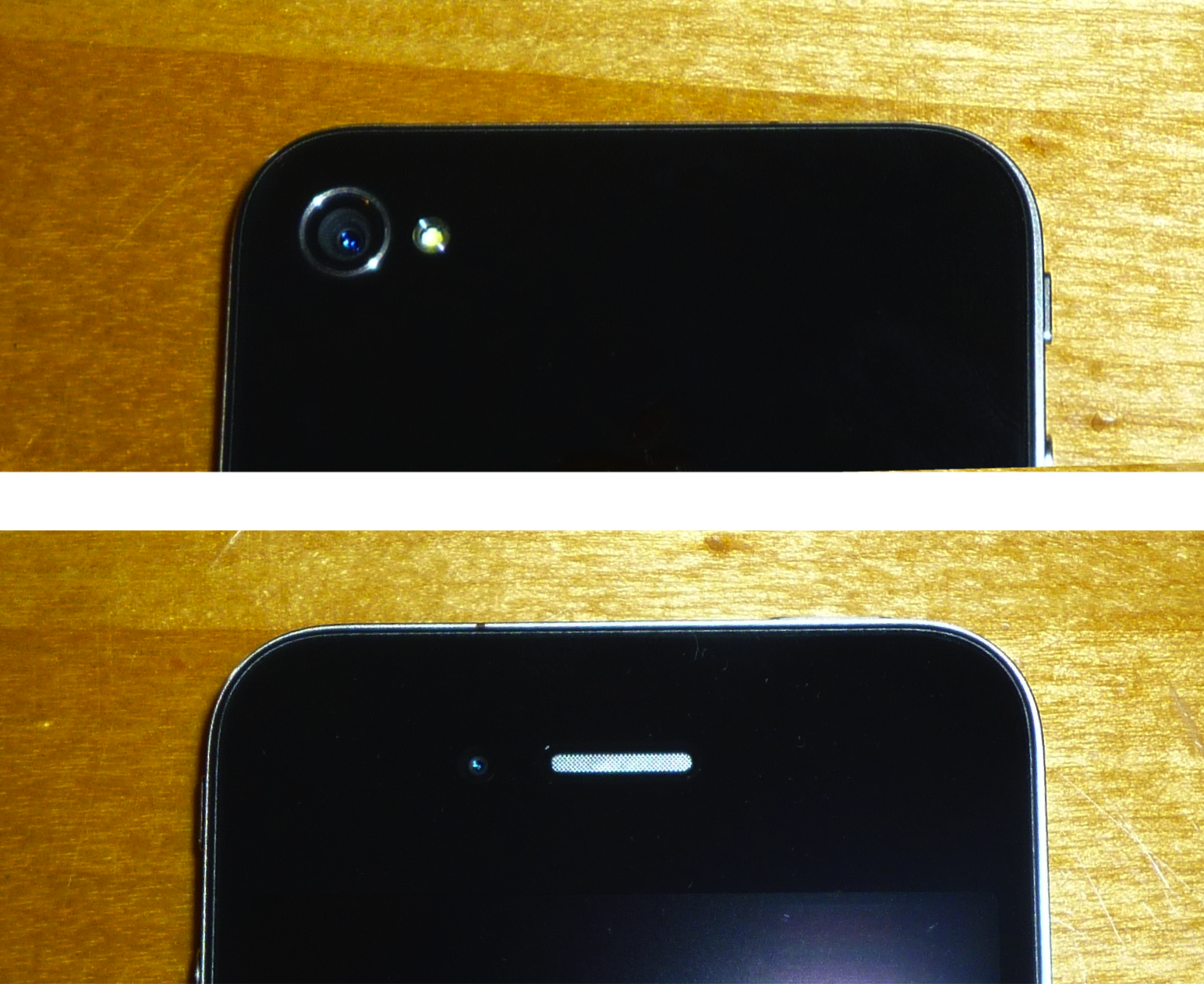
The iPhone 4 is the first generation to have two cameras. The LED flash for the rear-facing camera (top) and the forward-facing camera (bottom) are available on the iPhone 4 and subsequent models.

The first-generation iPhone (2007) and iPhone 3G (2008) have a fixed-focus 2.0-megapixel camera on the back for digital photos. It has no optical zoom, flash or autofocus, and does not natively support video recording. Video recording is possible on the first-generation iPhone and iPhone 3G via a third-party app available on the App Store or through jailbreaking. iPhone OS 2.0 introduced geotagging for photos.

The 2009 iPhone 3GS has a 3.2-megapixel camera with autofocus, auto white balance, and auto macro (up to 10 cm). Manufactured by OmniVision, the camera can also capture 640×480 (VGA resolution) video at 30 frames per second. The video can be cropped on the iPhone and directly uploaded to YouTube or other services.

The 2010 iPhone 4 introduced a 5.0-megapixel camera (2592×1936 pixels) that can record video at 720p resolution, considered high-definition. It also has a backside-illuminated sensor that can capture pictures in low light and an LED flash that can stay lit while recording video. It is the first iPhone that can natively do high dynamic range photography. The iPhone 4 also has a second camera on the front that can take VGA photos and record SD video. Saved recordings may be synced to the host computer, attached to email, or (where supported) sent by MMS.

The 2011 iPhone 4S camera can shoot 8-MP stills and 1080p video can be accessed directly from the lock screen and can be triggered using the volume-up button as a shutter trigger. The software makes use of the built-in gyroscope to artificially stabilize the image while recording video.

The iPhone 5 (2012) and iPhone 4S, running iOS 6 or later, can take panoramas using the built-in camera app, and the iPhone 5 can also take still photos while recording video. The iPhone 5 camera reportedly shows purple haze when the light source is just out of frame, although Consumer Reports said it "is no more prone to purple hazing on photos shot into a bright light source than its predecessor or than several Android phones with fine cameras..."

The camera on the iPhone 5 are protected by a sapphire lens cover, as are all subsequent models. In 2014, Apple consumed "one-fourth of the world’s supply of sapphire to cover the iPhone’s camera lens and fingerprint reader." The quality of the sapphire on the lens cover has since been disputed.

The 2013 iPhone 5S widens the aperture to f/2.2 and features True Tone Flash, which has two LED lights, white and amber, that will improve white balance in low light by separately adjusting in 1,000 combinations of brightness level. Its image sensor is now 15 percent larger (1/3") than its previous model (1/3.2") at the same resolution to increase the surface size of individual pixels, allowing them to capture more light in the same time. The iPhone 5C, however, has the same camera hardware and features as the iPhone 5.

The 2014 iPhone 6 and 6 Plus include phase detection autofocus, while only the 6 Plus has optical image stabilization. Both models can shoot 1080p videos at 60 frames per second, though optical image stabilization of the latter is unfunctional during video recording, making the iPhone 6s Plus of 2015 the first with optical video stabilization.

With the release of iOS 8, the iPhone 4S and later models can now shoot time-lapse videos, with its capability to switch frame rates automatically as the recording increases its time.

The 2015 iPhone 6S and 6S Plus are outfitted with a 12-megapixel camera, with 4K video capability at 30fps, both for the first time on iPhone. The front-facing camera is upgraded from 1.3 to 5 megapixels, though video resolution remains at 720p. Other features added are Live Photos, which captures a short video along a photo, and Retina Flash, which utilises the screen's backlight as front camera flash, though less powerful than the rear LED lamp.

The first-generation iPhone SE (2016) features the same 12 MP camera found on the iPhone 6S, with the same 4K and high frame rate video capability, but its front camera only has 1.2 megapixels, like the iPhone 5 and 5s.

The 2016 iPhone 7 features optical image stabilization on its rear camera, a feature that was previously exclusive to the Plus models, and the 7 Plus is the first iPhone to feature dual-lens cameras (both 12 MP). Both models have a 7 MP front-facing camera, with video resolution increased from 720p to 1080p. The second camera on the iPhone 7 Plus is a telephoto lens, which enables 2× optical zoom, allowing for the level of detail that the center crop of a 48-megapixel photo with the non-tele camera's field of view would have. The camera software allows up to 10× digital zoom. The rear cameras on the 7 and 7 Plus both have an f/1.8 aperture, as compared to f/2.2 on the iPhones 6 and 6 Plus, though the 7 Plus' tele camera has f/2.8 and is not optically stabilized. It also has a brighter quad-LED True Tone flash.

The 2017 iPhone 8 camera features a larger sensor and a newer color filter. The camera can also now record 4K at 60 and 24 frames per second, slow-mo at 1080p in 240 frames per second. The new camera system also enables Portrait Lighting, which defines the light in a scene. The 2017 iPhone X additionally adds optical image stabilization to the telephoto lens, and the TrueDepth camera system introduces Portrait Mode and Portrait Lighting to the front camera.

The iPhone XS and XR series have an updated 12MP (1/2.55") sensor size with a 1.4 μm pixel size. The XS series has a telephoto lens, while the lower end XR has only one lens. It also features Smart HDR, using the power of A12 Bionic chip, along with the Neural Engine, machine learning, artificial intelligence, and some advancements to provide better photos with improved dynamic range. Extended dynamic range for video up to and including 4K 30 fps. The devices film with stereo audio instead of mono audio for the first time on iPhone, even though two opposite-sided microphones had been built in since iPhone 4.

The iPhone 11 and 11 Pro series introduced an ultrawide lens; the latter two became the first triple-camera iPhones. The 11 has a dual-lens setup, lacking the telephoto lens of the 11 Pro and 11 Pro Max. The front camera is now capable of recording video at 4K as a result of a new 12 MP sensor, and can also capture slow-motion footage.

The second-generation iPhone SE's camera hardware is the same as the iPhone 8, but adds Portrait mode, Portrait lighting, Smart HDR, extended dynamic range for video up to 30 fps, stereo recording and cinematic video stabilization.

The iPhone 12 and 12 Pro series brought Night Mode to all camera lenses, including the TrueDepth camera. It also uses Deep Fusion in more situations, and uses Smart HDR 3. Dolby Vision HDR video recording up to 30 FPS is available for the iPhone 12 and 12 mini, and up to 60 FPS for the 12 Pro and 12 Pro Max. The 12 Pro Max also has a 47% larger sensor and sensor-shift stabilization for better low-light photos and more details. The telephoto camera can now zoom up to 2.5x on the Pro Max, albeit with a f/2.2 aperture instead of the 12 Pro's f/2.0 aperture.

The iPhone 14 and 14 Pro series introduced Photonic Engine image processing technology.

A "Keep Normal Photo" option accessible through the system settings allows saving HDR photos in both the high dynamic range and normal variants.

== SIM card ==
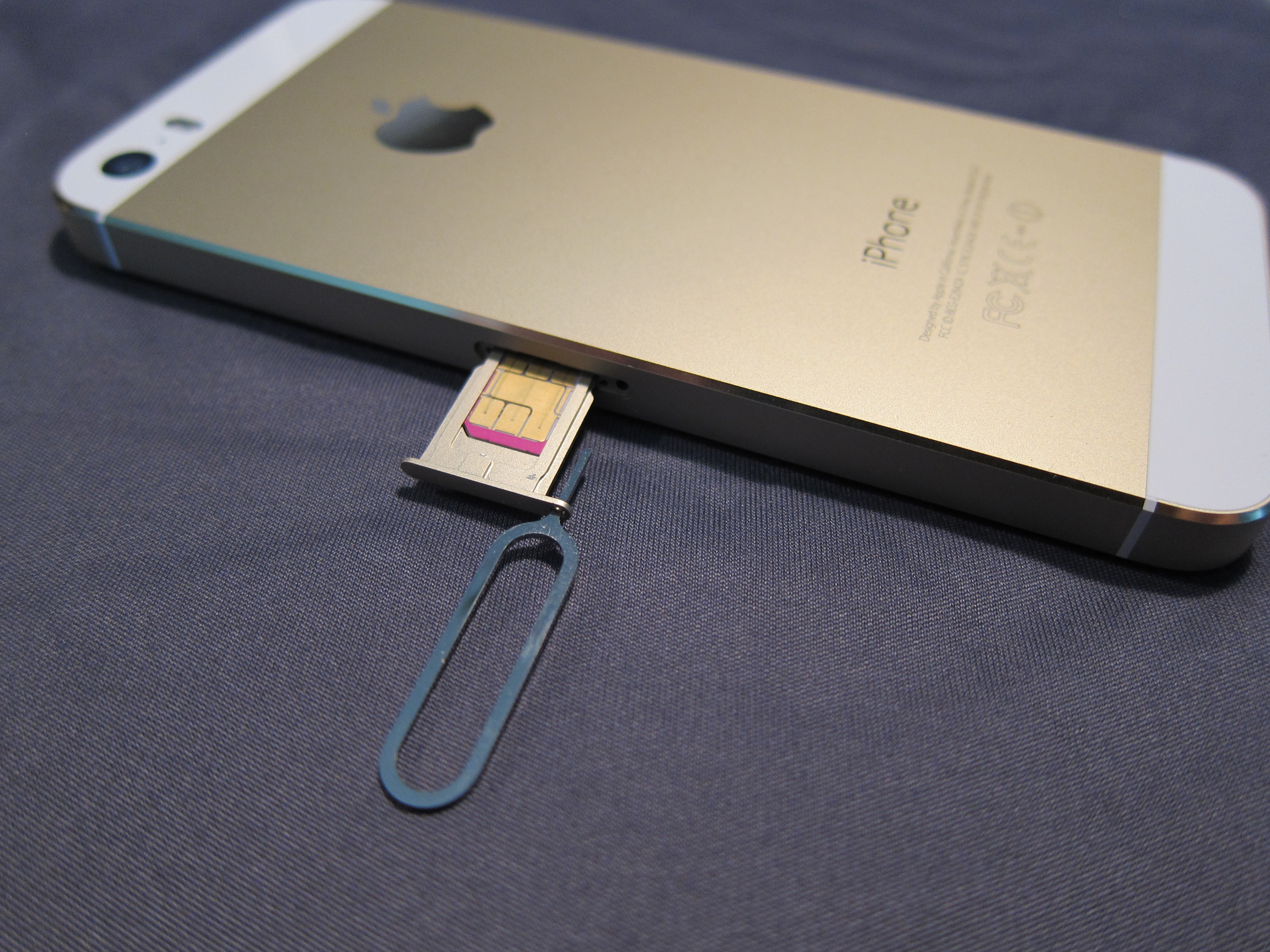
An iPhone 5S with the SIM slot open. The SIM ejector is still placed in the eject hole.

GSM models of the iPhone use a SIM card to identify themselves to the GSM network. The SIM sits in a tray, which is inserted into a slot at the top of the device. The SIM tray can be ejected with a paper clip or the "SIM ejector tool" (a simple piece of die-cut sheet metal) included with the iPhone 3G and 3GS in the United States and with all models elsewhere in the world. Some iPhone models shipped with a SIM ejector tool which was fabricated from an alloy dubbed "Liquidmetal". In most countries, the iPhone is usually sold with a SIM lock, which prevents the iPhone from being used on a different mobile network.

The GSM iPhone 4 features a MicroSIM card that is located in a slot on the right side of the device.

The CDMA model of the iPhone 4, just the same as any other CDMA-only cell phone, does not use a SIM card or have a SIM card slot.

An iPhone 4S activated on a CDMA carrier, however, does have a SIM card slot but does not rely on a SIM card for activation on that CDMA network. A CDMA-activated iPhone 4S usually has a carrier-approved roaming SIM preloaded in its SIM slot at the time of purchase that is used for roaming on certain carrier-approved international GSM networks only. The SIM slot is locked to only use the roaming SIM card provided by the CDMA carrier.

In the case of Verizon, for example, one can request that the SIM slot be unlocked for international use by calling their support number and requesting an international unlock if their account has been in good standing for the past 60 days. This method only unlocks the iPhone 4S for use on international carriers. An iPhone 4S that has been unlocked in this way will reject any non-international SIM cards (AT&T Mobility or T-Mobile USA, for example).

The iPhone 5 and later iPhones use nano-SIM in order to save space internally. The iPhone XS and later iPhones added eSIM support in addition to nano-SIM, therefore they support Dual SIM functionality.

iPhone 14 and 14 Pro and later models sold in the United States do not have the SIM card slot, and instead only supports eSIM.

In India, eSIM support for the iPhone was officially launched on September 28, 2018, alongside the release of the iPhone XS and iPhone XS Max. But up to the current iPhone 16 and 17 series it continue to include a physical SIM tray alongside eSIM support

== Liquid contact indicators ==
Pre-2016 iPhones (as well as many other devices by Apple) have a small disc at the bottom of the headphone jack that changes from white to red on contact with water (the iPhone 7 and later do not include a headphone jack); the iPhone 3G and later models also have a similar indicator at the bottom of the dock connector. Because Apple warranties do not cover water damage, employees examine the indicators before approving warranty repair or replacement. However, with the adoption of water resistance as a feature of the iPhone, this practice is no longer in use by Apple.

The iPhone's indicators are more exposed than those in some mobile phones from other manufacturers, which carry them in a more protected location, such as beneath the battery behind a battery cover. These indicators can be triggered during routine use, by an owner's sweat, steam in a bathroom, and other light environmental moisture. Criticism led Apple to change its water damage policy for iPhones and similar products, allowing customers to request further internal inspection of the phone to verify if internal liquid damage sensors were triggered.

== Included items ==
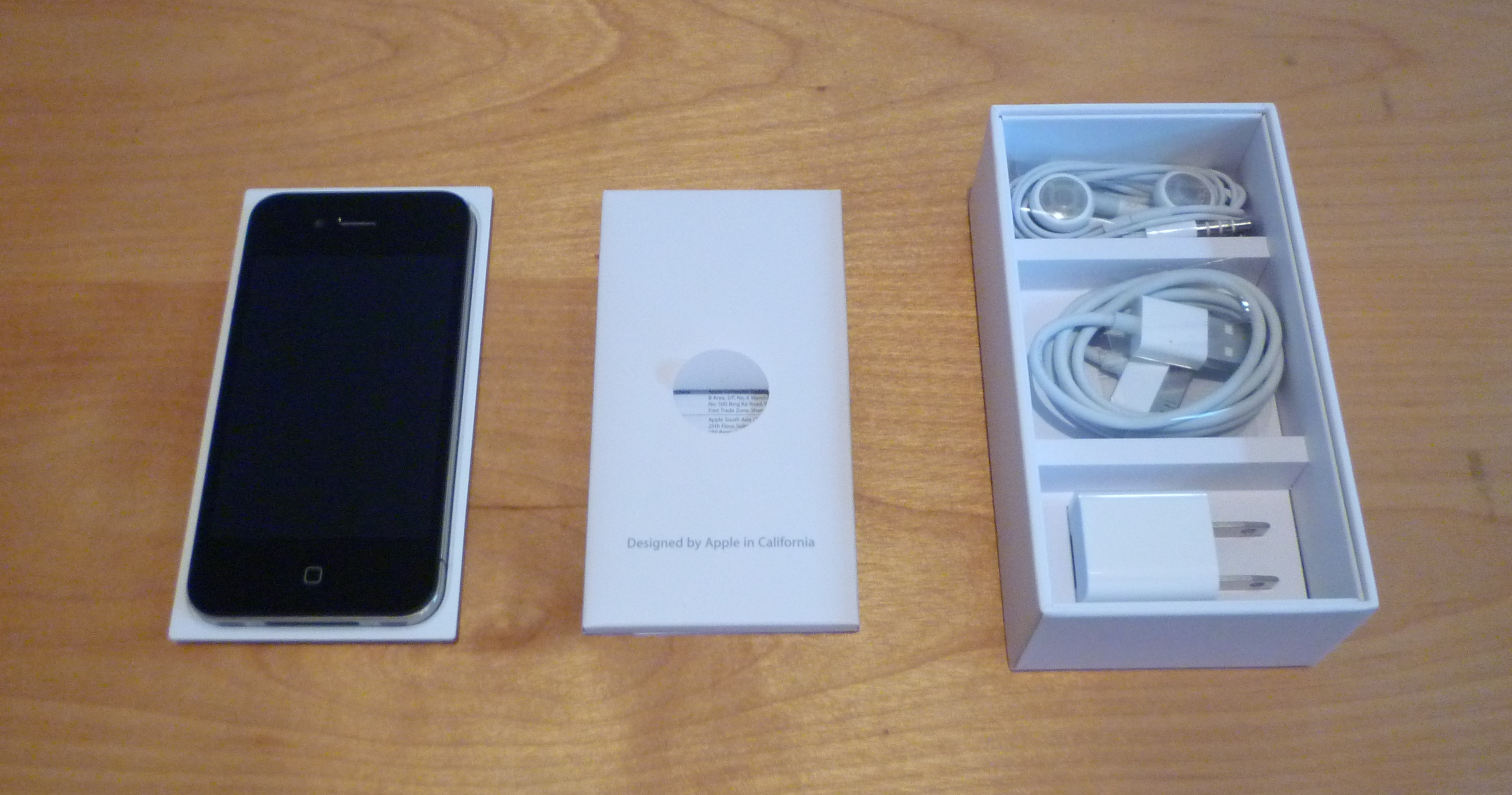
The contents of the box of an iPhone 4. From left to right: iPhone 4 in plastic holder, written documentation, and (top to bottom) headset, USB cable, wall charger.

Modern iPhone models (until the iPhone 15) include a lightning to USB cable. Starting with the iPhone 15, Apple included a USB-C to USB-C cable in place of the Lightning to USB cable. Pre-2012 models included written documentation, and a dock connector to USB cable. The first generation and 3G iPhones also came with a cleaning cloth. The first generation iPhone includes a stereo headset (earbuds and a microphone) and a plastic dock to hold the unit upright while charging and syncing. The iPhone 3G includes a similar headset plus a SIM eject tool (the first generation model requires a paperclip). The iPhone 3GS included the SIM eject tool and a revised headset, which adds volume buttons (not functional with previous iPhone versions).

The iPhone 3G and 3GS are compatible with the same dock, sold separately, but not the first generation model's dock. All versions include a USB power adapter, or "wall charger", which allows the iPhone to charge from an AC outlet. The iPhone 3G and iPhone 3GS sold in North America, Japan, Colombia, Ecuador, and Peru include an ultracompact USB power adapter.

In October 2020, at the iPhone 12 virtual event, Apple announced that they will be removing the power adapter and EarPods wired headset from all iPhone packaging, citing environmental reasons. Alongside this announcement, Apple reduced the retail prices of the AC adapter and EarPods.

== Payments ==
In September 2014, with the launch of the iPhone 6, Apple announced Apple Pay, a mobile payment system. The feature, aimed to "revolutionize" the way users pay, uses an NFC chip, Touch ID fingerprint scanner (Face ID on iPhone X and later), Apple's Wallet app, and a dedicated "Secure Element" chip for encrypted payment information to make purchases at participating stores, both physical and online.

== Taptic Engine ==
All iPhone models have a haptic engine to vibrate when a notification or alert, incoming call, etc. iPhone models before the iPhone 4S use an eccentric rotating mass motor, with the exception of the CDMA model of the iPhone 4. The iPhone 4S and CDMA iPhone 4 use a linear resonant actuator vibrator, which usually uses less power and creates a quieter vibration. However, the iPhone 5, 5C, and 5S use an eccentric rotating mass motor. It is unknown why Apple switched back to the previous type of vibrator, however the iPhone 6 and 6 Plus resumed the ongoing use of linear resonant actuator vibrators.

iPhone 6S and later use the Taptic Engine for vibration and haptic feedback, which works in a similar mechanical fashion to the linear resonant actuator vibrator in the iPhone 6 and iPhone 6 Plus, but is far more precise.

== Wireless ==
=== Cellular ===
iPhone has an Infineon PMB 8878 (S-Gold 2) cellular modem chip. The iPhone 4 was the first iPhone to use a Qualcomm cellular chip. The iPhone Xs is the first iPhone to use a MIMO 4x4 (with LAA) chip.

=== Wi-Fi ===
The iPhone has a 802.11b/g networking chip. The iPhone 6s and newer models have a MIMO 2x2 chip. The iPhone Air, iPhone 17, iPhone 17 Pro and iPhone 17 Pro Max have an Apple N1 wireless networking chip. The iPhone 16e has an Apple C1 cellular modem chip (which includes Wi-Fi). The iPhone 17e has an Apple C1X cellular modem chip (which includes Wi-Fi).

=== Bluetooth ===
The iPhone has a bluetooth 2.0 chip.

=== NFC ===
The iPhone 6 and newer models have a near-field communication chip. Chips on iPhone 6 and 6 Plus are software locked to only be used for Apple Pay.

=== UWB ===
The iPhone 11 and newer models have an ultra wideband chip. iPhone models 11 through 14 have an Apple U1 chip. The iPhone 15 and newer models have an Apple U2 chip. The iPhone SE2, iPhone SE3, iPhone 16e and iPhone 17e do not have ultra wideband chips. In September 2019, ultra wideband chip was software locked to Apple internal developers. In June 2020, developers outside Apple were given access. In June 2021, third-party hardware manufacturers were given access via MFi certification. In September 2021, access was opened to Apple users via third-party hardware.

== See also ==
- List of Apple Inc. suppliers#iPhone
