= Innotek =

Innotek may refer to:

- Innotek (Belgium), a Belgian technology centre
- Innotek GmbH, a former German software company which created VirtualBox
- LG Innotek, a South Korean electronic component company
