= Liquid Metal =

Liquid Metal may refer to:

- A liquid metal, which has a relatively low melting point, such as mercury, tin or lead
- Any metal in a liquid state
- Mercury, the only metal to be liquid at room temperature
- Liquid metallic hydrogen, predicted to be theoretically possible (may e.g. exist inside Jupiter)
- Liquidmetal, a type of metallic glass
- Liquid Metal (Sirius XM), a radio channel

== See also ==
- Liquid
- Metal
