= Gresso (company) =

GRESSO
- Type: Private company
- Industry: Fashion
- Headquarters: Miami, United States
- Products: Eyewear, Smartphones
- Website: gresso.com

GRESSO is an American company that manufactures luxury eyewear and used to manufacture luxury mobile phones and accessories. Gresso company was founded in 1999. The trademark is registered in Switzerland (IB of WIPO, reg. No. 994253). Gresso products are presented in Russia, CIS countries, Europe and America.

== History ==
The first collection of mobile phones was presented in 2006, with some made using gold and African blackwood.

In 2007, Forbes magazine included Gresso Avantgarde phone in top 10 most expensive mobile phones in the world.

In August 2007, the company introduced two models of luxury Avantgarde smartphones: Luna and Sol based on Windows Mobile 6.0 Standard operation system and Gresso interface. African blackwood and gold were used in case manufacturing.

In August 2009, the company introduced new Gresso Grand Monaco phone collection. The phone case was made using titanium alloy and covered with several layers of ceramic. Front and back phone panels were made from carbon. The screen was framed in a 42 carat sapphire glass.

In March 2010, the company introduced its first collection of Gresso Grand Monaco phones for women, with some phones made entirely from crocodile leather.

In 2011, Gresso presented new Luxor phone collection. The collection included 3 models:

- Luxor Las Vegas Jackpot
- Luxor World Time
- Luxor

In 2011, Gresso introduced new Grand Premiere mobile handset.

In April 2012, Gresso Regal Black were introduced. A total of 333 phones was produced at the price of $5000.

In September 2012, Gresso company introduced bumper-case for iPhone 5. Gresso Alligator bumper is made using tempered titanium.

In 2012, Gresso introduced its first accessories for iPhone 5 and Samsung Galaxy S III.

In December 2013, Gresso launched its first luxury titanium smartphone Gresso Radical (OS Android).

In March 2014, Gresso introduced the most expensive Gresso Titanium Bumpers at a cost of $10,000.

In 2019, Gresso started manufacturing high end eyewear using lightweight titanium frames.

== See also ==
- Goldvish
- Vertu
