= Wingtech =

Chinese semiconductor manufacturer

Wingtech Technology
- Native name: 闻泰科技股份有限公司
- Type: Public; state-owned (partial)
- Traded as: SSE: 600745
- Industry: Manufacturing
- Founded: 2006; 20 years ago
- Headquarters: Jiaxing, Zhejiang, China
- Products: Electronics
- Owner: State Council of the People's Republic of China; Luxshare
- Subsidiaries: Nexperia
- Website: www.wingtech.com

Wingtech Technology is a Chinese partially state-owned publicly-traded semiconductor and communications product integration company based in Jiaxing, Zhejiang. It has been listed on the Shanghai Stock Exchange since 2015. It is partly owned by Luxshare.

== History ==
The company was founded as original design manufacturer in 2006 by a former STMicroelectronics engineer, Zhang Xuezheng. Wingtech's main business includes semiconductor chip design, wafer manufacturing, optical imaging and communication product integration. The company is partially owned by several state-owned enterprises under the direction of the State-owned Assets Supervision and Administration Commission of the State Council (SASAC).

In 2019, Wingtech acquired Nexperia. The Nexperia semiconductor subsidiary, originally Royal Philips semiconductor, manufactures wafers. In 2021, Wingtech acquired Ofilm Group, a former iPhone camera module supplier. In 2023, Wingtech agreed to sell the Inmos microprocessor factory following a UK government divestment order on national security concerns. During the 2022 COVID-19 protests in China, Wingtech was reported by The Wall Street Journal to have gained an additional foothold in Apple's supply chain following protests at a Foxconn factory in the Zhengzhou Airport Economy Zone.

In December 2024, Wingtech was targeted in a new round of US export controls and added to the United States Department of Commerce's Entity List. In June 2025, Wingtech was reported to have produced Trump Mobile's T1 mobile phones. In October 2025, the Dutch Ministry of Economic Affairs took control of Nexperia using the powers of the Goods Availability Act, citing reasons of national security and European economic security. In November 2025, Wingtech filed a challenge in the Supreme Court of the Netherlands. In 2025, the company's controlling shareholder Zhang Xuezheng announced plans to transfer their shares to Wuxi Guolian Group, a Wuxi state-owned enterprise. In May 2026, Wingtech filed a lawsuit against Nexperia, seeking US$1.2 billion compensation for alleged losses. In October 2026, Nexperia filed a lawsuit in a Dutch court against Wingtech and its founder.
