= Goldvish =

GoldVish
- Industry: Consumer electronics
- Headquarters: Geneva (Headquarters)
- Key people: Gregor Snip (Founder); Michel Morren (Founder); Emmanuel Gueit (Designer)
- Products: Luxury mobile phones & accessories
- Website: www.goldvish.com

GoldVish is a Swiss manufacturer of premium luxury mobile phones and watches. The company is specialized in combining high-end technology and Swiss craftsmanship.

== Overview ==
In 2006, GoldVish's "Le Million", a solid gold, diamond-studded "Piece Unique" is listed in the Guinness Book of World Records as "The world's most exclusive and expensive cellular phone ever sold" at €1 million and a guaranteed limited production of three pieces.

== See also ==
- Gresso
- Vertu
- Moscow Millionaire Fair
