= Newport Wafer Fab =

Semiconductor fabrication plant in Wales

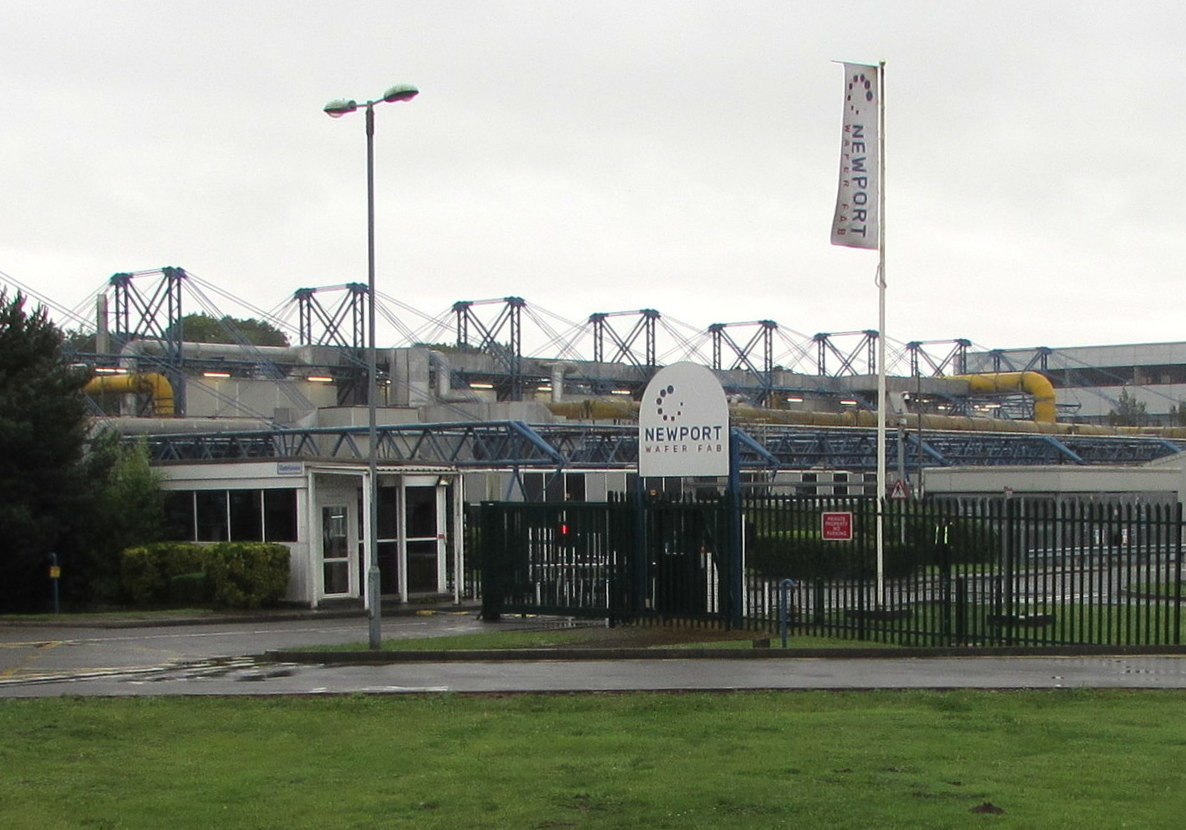
- The microprocessor factory in 2019 when it was owned by Newport Wafer Fab

General information
- Architectural style: High-tech
- Location: Newport, Cardiff Road, Wales
- Coordinates: 51°33′57″N 3°01′21″W
- Construction started: 1980
- Completed: 1982
- Owner: Vishay Intertechnology

Technical details
- Size: 8,900 m²
- Floor count: 1 (factory area)

Design and construction
- Architects: Project Architects: David Bartlett; Pierre Botschi; Mike Davies; Sally Eaton; Michael Elkan; Marco Goldschmied; Kunimi Hayashi; Tim Inskip; Julia Marks; Peter McMunn; Richard Rogers; John Young
- Architecture firm: Richard Rogers Partnership
- Structural engineer: Anthony Hunt Associates
- Services engineer: YRM Engineers
- Quantity surveyor: G A Hanscomb
- Main contractor: Laing Construction
- Awards: Structural Steel Design Award 1982; Eurostructpress Award 1983; Financial Times Architecture at Work Award Commendation 1983; Constructa-Preis for Overall Excellence in the Field of Architecture 1986

Newport Wafer Fab, previously known as Inmos microprocessor factory, now known as Vishay Newport, is a semiconductor fabrication plant built in Newport, Wales, UK in 1980. It has gone through numerous changes in ownership. Since March 2024, the factory has been owned by Vishay Intertechnology.

The architects of the award-winning high-tech building were the Richard Rogers Partnership and the factory was the first building in Wales which Richard Rogers designed. It is a Grade II*-listed building.

== Ownership ==
The building was originally commissioned by Inmos, but by July 1984 Thorn EMI had taken over Inmos.

In March 1989, Thorn EMI sold Inmos to the recently-created multinational SGS-Thomson Microelectronics NV.

In 1999, a management buyout took over the factory through a $160 million transaction, after which the business was renamed European Semiconductor Manufacturing Limited with plans to orient production towards the mixed-signal chip segment. Three years later, European Semiconductor Manufacturing Limited entered receivership and its assets, including the factory, were acquired by the American power management company International Rectifier Company (GB) Limited in exchange for $81 million.

In January 2015, it was acquired by the German semiconductor company Infineon Technologies, placing it under its subsidiary company IR Newport Ltd. Two years later, Infineon sold the site to Neptune 6 Limited, under its subsidiary company of Newport Wafer Fab Limited.

In July 2021, the site was sold to Chinese-owned Dutch-headquartered Nexperia, who also have plants in Hamburg and Manchester. Kwasi Kwarteng, then Secretary of State for Business, Energy and Industrial Strategy, deemed the sale insignificant to national security at the time of the acquisition. Based on a report by Datenna, CNBC reported on 7 July that about 30% of the shares of Nexperia's parent company Wingtech could be traced back to the Chinese government, which, according to Datenna, led to high-level Chinese government influence in 2021.

On 8 July 2021, British Prime Minister Boris Johnson announced that a security review would be launched, overriding Kwarteng's initial assessment. He appointed National Security Adviser Stephen Lovegrove as head of the review process. Newport Water Fab only heard about the review through media reports. In December 2021, Lovegrove assured that the sale was under review but would not go into details. In April 2022, the investigation was completed and had come to the same conclusion as the previous Deputy National Security Advisor, that the plant was not a national security issue because the technology used was 20 years old and China already had it.

In May 2022, a new Datenna investigation found that the overall percentage of shares traced to Chinese government entities declined to about 20 percent, resulting in a medium risk of government influence.

In May 2022, another investigation was launched under the National Security and Investment Act. The investigation was supposed to take 30 days but ended up taking almost 6 months. On 16 November 2022, the Department for Business, Energy and Industrial Strategy of the British government ordered Nexperia to divest 86% of its ownership interest in Nexperia Newport Limited (NNL, formerly Newport Wafer Fab) for national security reasons, which Nexperia has vowed to appeal. Nexperia's UK manager said they rescued an investment-starved company from collapse, [...] repaid taxpayer loans, secured jobs, wages, bonuses and pensions, and agreed to spend more than £80 million on equipment upgrades since early 2021". The company said the decision was "legally wrong and disproportionate" in light of changes it had made to address the government's concerns, including a promise not to produce more sophisticated compound semiconductors.

In December 2022, it was announced Nexperia had engaged New York law firm, Akin Gump to act on their behalf in their application for a judicial review of the UK government’s decision. Nexperia agreed to sell the facility to Vishay Intertechnology for $177 million in November 2023. Nexperia sold 100% of Nexperia Newport Limited, which owned and operated the Newport facility, to Vishay. In March 2024, the UK government approved the acquisition of the Newport wafer fab, as announced by Secretary of State Oliver Dowden. With the acquisition by Vishay, the 580 Newport employees retained their positions.

== History of design and construction ==
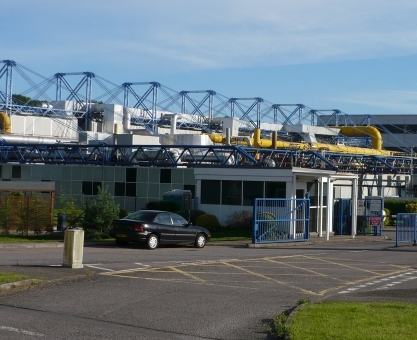
The former Inmos microprocessor factory in 2007 when it was owned by International Rectifier

Inmos Limited commissioned the Richard Rogers Partnership, now known as Rogers Stirk Harbour & Partners, to design its UK microprocessor manufacturing facility at Newport. The design criterion was for a fast construction, so that it was ready for operation within one year of starting. Richard Rogers until then was known for designing the Centre Pompidou in Paris and the Lloyd's building in London. The main contractor for the construction of the building was Laing Construction, the structural engineers were Anthony Hunt Associates, the services engineers were YRM Engineers and the quantity surveyors were GA Hanscomb Partnership.

The technical requirements were that it would house controlled conditions for the production of electronic microchips, a service area for various offices and a staff canteen, all under one roof. The Inmos factory was designed to be a model factory that could be constructed in a variety of locations. The speed of the design process and construction time of the building were critical. The 8,900 square metres (96,000 ft^{2}) single-storey building was designed to be fabricated off-site, and assembled on the Newport site.

The building is divided into "clean" and "dirty" areas. The cleanroom being for microchip production and the dirty area for all others services in the building. The building has a central spine which is 7.2 metres (24 ft) wide and 106 m (348 ft) from which all the services and production area emanates from eight bays with the potential to increase this to 20 bays. Suspended beams span 40m from the central spine with masts along the length of the building allowing for a post-free area, and so providing a flexible interior and the possibility of large work areas. Reyner Banham, the architectural critic and writer, said of the Inmos factory that it was "the first really challenging building of the 1980s." Construction began in 1980 and was completed by 1982.

On 7 November 2025, the factory was given a Grade II* listing for being "a late example of post-war UK government efforts to seed new manufacturing in Wales to mitigate the decline of Victorian heavy industries." The Cadw listing report describes the factory as, "the most important example of the British High-Tech style of Late Modernist architecture in Wales."
