= Wang Laichun =

Chinese billionaire businesswoman (born 1967)

Grace Wang
- 王来春
- Born: 1967 (age 58–59); Guangdong, China
- Education: Tsinghua University (EMBA)
- Occupation: Businesswoman
- Known for: Co-founding Luxshare
- Title: Chairwoman and CEO of Luxshare

Wang Laichun (Chinese: 王来春; pinyin: Wáng Láichūn; born 1967), also known in English as Grace Wang, is a Chinese businesswoman and billionaire who co-founded the electronics manufacturer Luxshare and now serves as its chairwoman and chief executive officer. Founded in 2004 in Dongguan, China, the company designs and manufacturers computer cables; it also assembles AirPods for Apple. The company was listed publicly on the SME board of the Shenzhen Stock Exchange in 2010.

Wang was born in 1967 in southern Guangdong province, China; she is a native of the city of Shantou. From 1984 to 1986, Wang was an employee of Sanyo. In 1988, the year Wang graduated from junior high school, Foxconn established a factory in Shenzhen. Then 21 years old, Wang began working as an assembly operator in the factory.

In 1997, Wang left Foxconn to work with brother Wang Laisheng in starting their own company. Luxshare was founded in 2004, and Laisheng became vice chairman of the company. From 2007 to 2021, Foxconn was a client of Luxshare and provided the company half of its operating revenue.

Wang worked in factories during her teenage years. She holds an executive MBA from Tsinghua University.

In 2014, The Daily Telegraph included Wang in a list of the world's richest five self-made women. China Daily named Wang the second-richest Chinese woman in 2021. In 2024, Forbes listed Wang number 51 in its annual list of the world's most powerful women. The 2024 Fortune list of powerful people in business placed Wang at rank 56 worldwide, 10th among women, and 1st on its list of powerful women in Asia.
