= Metal Workers Alliance of the Philippines =

Trade union of metal workers in the Philippines

MWAP
- Founded: 2004
- Location: Philippines
- Key people: Julius Carandang, National Coordinator
- Affiliations: IndustriALL Global Union
- Website: https://mwaponline.wordpress.com

The Metal Workers Alliance of the Philippines (MWAP) is a trade union federation of metal workers in the Philippines. This includes workers in the electronics industry. MWAP is an affiliate of IndustriALL Global Union.

== History ==
MWAP was established in 2004.

In May 2014, NXP Semiconductors fired 24 MWAP officials working at a factory in a special economic zone in Cabuyao, Laguna. The plant supplied microchips for companies such as Apple, Samsung, Bosch or Nokia. The workers were fired due to their union functions during negotiations for a new collective bargaining agreement. Factory owners claimed the workers were fired after refusing to work on April 9, while workers said they had not been paid for two months. IndustriALL and its affiliated unions in the Philippines condemned the dismissals. In September, MWAP reached an agreement with the factory by which 12 of the fired workers were reinstated and the other 12 received separation packages. NXP also committed itself to a long-term wage increase. In the summer of 2015, a member of the Dutch parliament questioned trade minister Lilianne Ploumen regarding the Dutch-American firm's behaviour.

In December 2020, MWAP signed a new collective bargaining agreement with Nexperia.

During the COVID-19 pandemic, MWAP demanded 14-day sick leave for infected workers.
