= Goods Availability Act =

Dutch national security law

States General of the Netherlands
- Citation: Staatsblad 1952, 407
- Enacted by: Queen Juliana
- Enacted: 10 July 1952
- Commenced: 20 July 1952
- Status: In force

The Goods Availability Act (Dutch: Wet beschikbaarheid goederen, abbreviated Wbg) is a 1952 Dutch framework law that grants the government powers to secure the availability of essential goods during a national emergency. Enacted during the early Cold War, the law allows any government minister to issue orders controlling the use, modification, and maintenance of goods to prepare for or respond to extraordinary circumstances.

The act was notably invoked in October 2025 by the Minister of Economic Affairs citing "administrative issues" at the semiconductor manufacturer Nexperia.

== Meaning of "goods" ==
For the definition of goods, the law refers to section 1 of article 3 of the Dutch civil code, Burgerlijk Wetboek (BW 3.1). BW 3.1 defines Dutch: goederen as including both things and property rights (cf. English "assets").

== History and purpose ==
The Goods Availability Act was created in the context of post-World War II reconstruction and rising geopolitical tensions between the West and the Soviet Union. The Dutch government sought a legal basis to manage national resources and ensure economic stability in the event of a future conflict. The law was designed to give the executive branch the authority to intervene in the economy to prevent hoarding, ensure the maintenance of critical infrastructure, and control the distribution of essential materials without having to declare a formal state of emergency. It is considered a key piece of Dutch state emergency law (Dutch: staatsnoodrecht).

On 1 October 2025, the Minister of Economic Affairs delegated the authority under the Goods Availability Act to the officials of the Economic Security Inspectorate (Dutch: Afdeling Toezicht Economische Veiligheid) as the supervisors responsible for enforcing any orders issued by the Minister of Economic Affairs under this act.

== Provisions ==
The act grants broad but specific powers to government ministers, primarily exercised with the consent of the Minister of Economic Affairs and Climate Policy. A minister can issue an order to a rights-holder (an owner or possessor) of goods to:

- Prohibit alterations to the goods, their condition, or their location without a permit.
- Mandate specific changes to be made to the goods.
- Forbid the consumption or processing of goods without a permit.
- Ensure the effective maintenance of the goods.
- Temporarily make goods available for inspection.

An order given by the Minister of Defence for the execution of military tasks takes precedence over orders from other ministers.

=== Compensation ===
The law stipulates that any person or entity that suffers financial damage as a result of an order is entitled to compensation from the state. The amount is first negotiated between the minister and the affected party. If no agreement can be reached, the compensation is definitively determined by a special commission established by the government.

== 2025 invocation regarding Nexperia ==
On October 12, 2025, the Minister of Economic Affairs invoked the Goods Availability Act for the first time. The government issued an order directed at the semiconductor company Nexperia in response to what the official announcement called "significant administrative shortcomings" that posed a risk to the continuity of a vital national industry. The specific details of the order were not made public, but it was intended to ensure the stability of the company's operations and the supply of semiconductors.

== See also ==
- Defense Production Act similar United States federal/national legislation

== Sources ==
- Ministry of Economic Affairs (12 October 2025). "Minister of Economic Affairs invokes Goods Availability Act". Government.nl.
- Bol, C.S., ed. (2005). Prijzenwet, Hamsterwet, Distributiewet en andere crisiswetten [Price Act, Hoarding Act, Distribution Act and other crisis laws] (in Dutch). Updated to 15 April 2005. (6th ed.). Kluwer. ISBN 9789014087986.
- Bounds, Andy; McMorrow, Ryan; Sevastopulo, Demetri (12 October 2025). "Dutch government takes control of Chinese-owned chipmaker Nexperia". Financial Times.
- Chia, Osmond (12 October 2025). "Netherlands cracks down on China-owned chip firm over security risk". BBC News.
- Demertzis, Maria (May 2026). Lessons in Economic Security: The Case of Nexperia (STG Policy Papers). Florence School of Transnational Governance, European University Institute.
- Herik, Larissa van den; Hondius, Ewoud; Voermans, Wim (2022-01-27). Introduction to Dutch Law. Kluwer Law International B.V. ISBN 978-94-035-4053-5.
