= Liquidmetal =

Amorphous metal alloy brand associated with Caltech

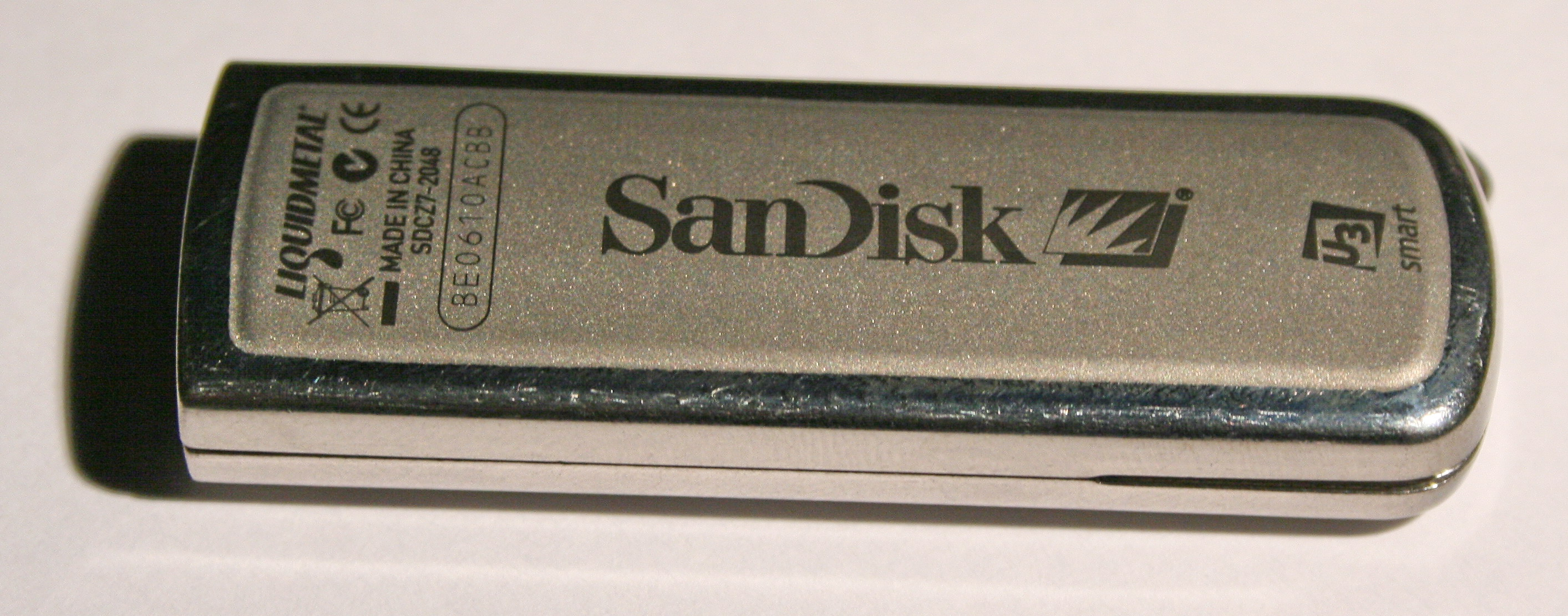
A USB flash drive with a Liquidmetal case.

Liquidmetal and Vitreloy are commercial names of a series of amorphous metal alloys developed by a California Institute of Technology (Caltech) research team and marketed by Liquidmetal Technologies. Liquidmetal alloys combine a number of desirable material features, including high tensile strength, excellent corrosion resistance, very high coefficient of restitution and excellent anti-wearing characteristics, while also being able to be heat-formed in processes similar to thermoplastics. Despite the name, they are not liquid at room temperature.

Liquidmetal was introduced for commercial applications in 2003. It is used for, among other things, golf clubs, watches, and covers of cell phones.

The alloy was the result of a research program into amorphous metals carried out at Caltech. It was the first of a series of experimental alloys that could achieve an amorphous structure at relatively slow cooling rates. Amorphous metals had been made before, but only in small batches because cooling rates needed to be in the millions of degrees per second. For example, amorphous wires could be fabricated by splat quenching a stream of molten metal on a spinning disk. Because Vitreloy allowed such slow cooling rates, production of larger batch sizes was possible. More recently, a number of additional alloys have been added to the Liquidmetal portfolio. These alloys also retain their amorphous structure after repeated re-heating, allowing them to be used in a wide variety of traditional machining processes.

== Characteristics ==
Liquid metal, created by Dr. Atakan Peker, contain atoms of significantly different sizes. They form a dense mix with low free volume. Unlike crystalline metals, there is no obvious melting point at which viscosity drops suddenly. Vitreloy behaves more like other glasses, in that its viscosity drops gradually with increased temperature. At high temperature, it behaves in a plastic manner, allowing the mechanical properties to be controlled relatively easily during casting. The viscosity prevents the atoms moving enough to form an ordered lattice, so the material retains its amorphous properties even after being heat-formed.

The alloys have relatively low softening temperatures, allowing casting of complex shapes without needing finishing. The material properties immediately after casting are much better than those of conventional metals; usually, cast metals have worse properties than forged or wrought ones. The alloys are also malleable at low temperatures (400 °C or 752 °F for the earliest formulation), and can be molded. The low free volume also results in low shrinkage during cooling. For all of these reasons, Liquidmetal can be formed into complex shapes using processes similar to thermoplastics, which makes Liquidmetal a potential replacement for many applications where plastics would normally be used.

Due to their non-crystalline (amorphous) structures, Liquidmetals are harder than alloys of titanium or aluminum of similar composition. The zirconium and titanium based Liquidmetal alloys achieved yield strength of over 1,723 MPa (249,900 psi), nearly twice the strength of conventional crystalline titanium alloys (Ti-6Al-4V is ~830 MPa (120,000 psi)), and about the strength of high-strength steels and some highly engineered bulk composite materials (see tensile strength for a list of common materials). However, the early casting methods introduced microscopic flaws that were excellent sites for crack propagation which led to Vitreloy being fragile like glass. Although strong, these early batches shattered easily when struck. Newer casting methods, adjustments of the alloy mixtures and other changes have improved this.

The lack of grain boundaries in a metallic glass eliminates grain-boundary corrosion—a common problem in high-strength alloys produced by precipitation hardening and sensitized stainless steels. Liquidmetal alloys are therefore generally more corrosion resistant, both due to the mechanical structure as well as the elements used in its alloy. The combination of mechanical hardness, high elasticity and corrosion resistance makes Liquidmetal wear resistant.

Although at high temperatures, plastic deformation occurs easily, almost none occurs at room temperature before the onset of catastrophic failure. This limits the material's applicability in reliability-critical applications, as the impending failure is not evident. The material is also susceptible to metal fatigue with crack growth. A two-phase composite structure with amorphous matrix and a ductile dendritic crystalline-phase reinforcement, or a metal matrix composite reinforced with fibers of other material can reduce or eliminate this disadvantage.

== Uses ==
Liquidmetal combines a number of features that are normally not found in any one material. This makes them useful in a wide variety of applications.

One of the first commercial uses of Liquidmetal was in golf clubs made by the company, where the highly elastic metal was used in portions of the club face. These were highly rated by users, but the product was later dropped, in part because the prototypes shattered after fewer than 40 hits. Since then, Liquidmetal has appeared in other sports equipment, including the cores of golf balls, skis, baseball and softball bats, and tennis racquets.

The ability to be cast and molded, combined with high wear resistance, has also led to Liquidmetal being used as a replacement for plastics in some applications. It has been used on the casing of late-model SanDisk "Cruzer Titanium" USB flash drives as well as their Sansa line of flash-based MP3 player, and casings of some mobile phones, like the luxury Vertu products, and other toughened consumer electronics. Liquidmetal was used in the Biolase dental laser Ilase and the Socketmobile ring bar code scanner. Liquidmetal has also notably been used for making the SIM ejector tool of some iPhone 3Gs made by Apple Inc., shipped in the US. This was done by Apple as an exercise to test the viability of usage of the metal. They retain a scratch-free surface longer than competing materials, while still being made in complex shapes. The same qualities lend it to use as protective coatings for industrial machinery, including petroleum drill pipes and power plant boiler tubes.

It also replaces titanium in applications ranging from medical instruments and cars to the military and aerospace industry. In military applications, amorphous metals could replace depleted uranium in kinetic energy penetrators. Plates of Liquidmetal were used in the solar wind ion collector array in the Genesis space probe.

== Commercial alloys ==
A range of zirconium-based alloys have been marketed under this trade name. Some example compositions are listed below, in molar percent:

- An early alloy, Vitreloy 1:
  Zirconium: 41.2, beryllium: 22.5, titanium: 13.8, copper: 12.5, nickel: 10
- A variant, Vitreloy 4 (Vit4):
  Zirconium: 46.75, beryllium: 27.5, titanium: 8.25, copper: 7.5, nickel: 10
- Vitreloy 105 (Vit105):
  Zirconium: 52.5, titanium: 5, copper: 17.9, nickel: 14.6, aluminium: 10
- A more recent development (Vitreloy 106a), which forms glass under less rapid cooling:
  Zirconium: 58.5, copper: 15.6, nickel: 12.8, aluminium: 10.3, niobium: 2.8

== Licensed uses ==
- Apple Inc., acquired a perpetual, exclusive license to use the technologies developed after 2010 in consumer electronics.
- The Swatch Group, was granted an exclusive license to utilize Liquidmetal alloys developed after 2010 in its timepieces.
