= Catcher Technology =

Manufacturing company of Taiwan

Catcher Technology Corporation
- Native name: 可成科技股份有限公司
- Romanized name: KeCheng KeJih GuFeng YouHsian GongShi
- Type: Public
- Traded as: TWSE: 2474
- Industry: Computer Peripherals
- Founded: 23 November 1984; 41 years ago
- Headquarters: No. 398, Ren-Ai Street, YungKang District, Tainan City, Tainan City, Taiwan
- Key people: Hong Shui-Shu 洪水樹, Chairman, Hong Tian-Cih 洪天賜, GM
- Revenue: NT$91,628,115,000
- Number of employees: 4963
- Website: www.catcher-group.com

Catcher Technology Corporation is an electronics casing manufacturing company founded on November 23, 1984. The company has since focused on making shells for electronics such as PC notebooks, cell phones, and cameras, using magnesium alloy die castings, aluminum alloys, zinc alloys, stainless steel or plastic. In 2004, Catcher Technology moved its headquarters from HaiChong Street to its current address, which was the original site of the headquarters of Taiwan Sugar Corporation YungKang Plant.

Catcher's current product revenue mix comes from cell phone casings (50%), PC/notebook (20%-30%), while tablets and others account for 10%-20%. Catcher is also a supplier for Apple, however, it failed to be included in the iPhone SE2 supply chain.

== History ==
In 2010, Catcher's yearly revenue reached a new high of 21.8 billion twd.

In April 2013, Catcher has under its assets, around 15,600 CNC machines.

In August 2020, Catcher sold two units in China to Lens Technology for $1.43 billion.

== See also ==
- 可成科技
- Khó-sêng_Kho-ki
- Luxshare
