= LG Innotek =

South Korean electronics manufacturer

LG Innotek Co. Ltd.
- Native name: 엘지이노텍 주식회사
- Type: Public
- Traded as: KRX: 011070
- Founded: February 1970; 56 years ago
- Headquarters: Seoul, South Korea
- Products: Camera module, ball grid array
- Owner: LG Electronics (40.8%)
- Website: www.lginnotek.com

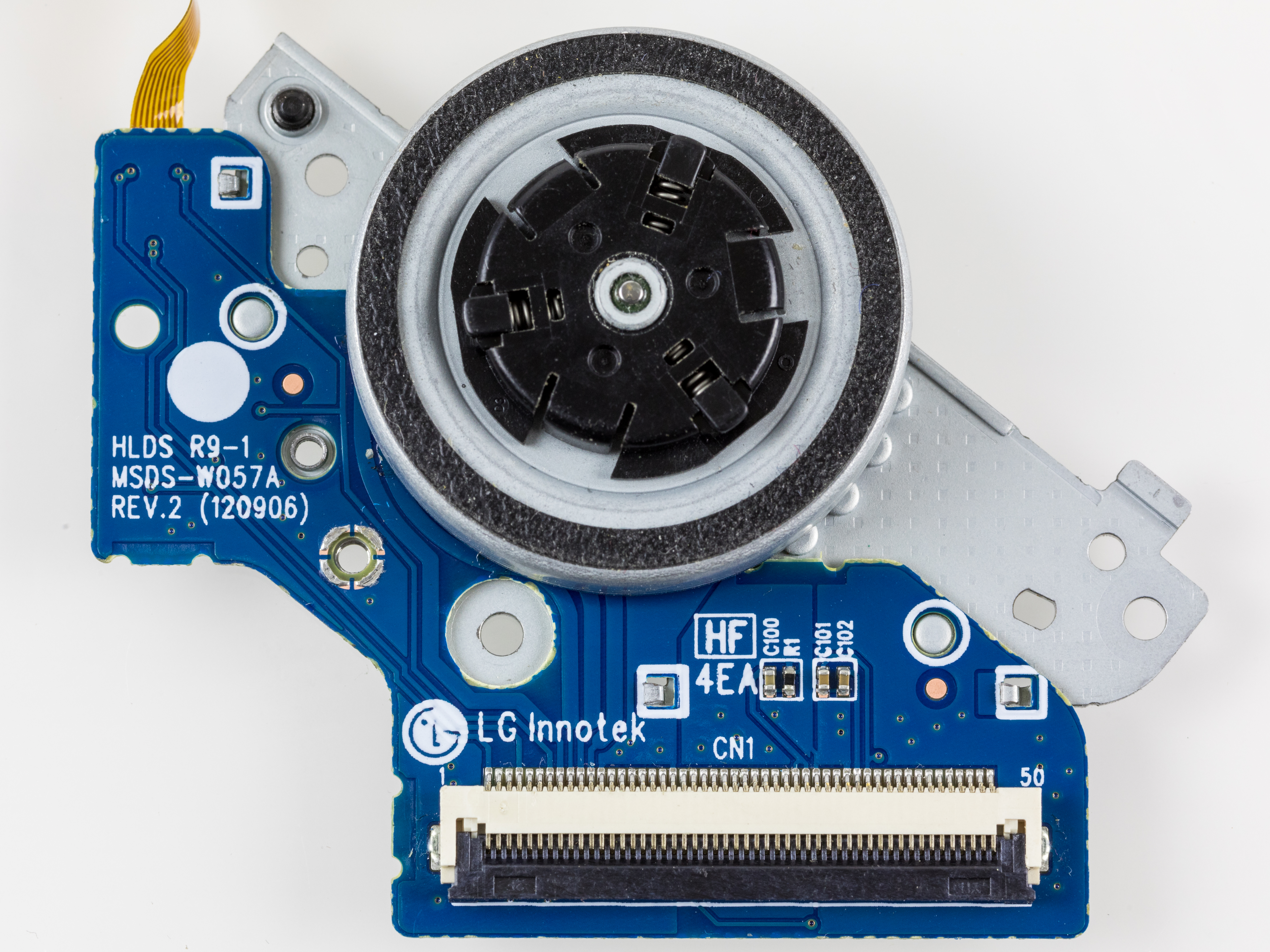
An LG Innotek motor in Hitachi-LG Data Storage DVD writer

LG Innotek Co., Ltd. (Korean: 엘지이노텍 주식회사), an affiliate of LG Group, is an electronic component manufacturer headquartered in Seoul, South Korea. LG Innotek produces core components of mobile devices, automotive displays, semiconductors, and smart products. Most of the company's revenue is generated from selling camera modules for the iPhone.

== History ==
LG Innotek was set up as Goldstar Precision in 1970. LG Innotek spun off its defense business, NEXFuture1, and sold it to LIG Group in 2004. LG Innotek merged LG Micron, another LG Group component-producing arm, in July 2009.

In November 2012, LG Innotek agreed with Osram to "settle all LED patent suits", agreeing to cross-license.

In October 2024, LG Innotek, said it has developed a high-performing magnet that requires zero heavy rare-earth metals in collaboration with the Korea Institute of Materials Science.

In July 2025, LG Innotek took an equity stake in Aeva.

== See also ==
- iPhone hardware
