= Nexperia =

Semiconductor company in the Netherlands

Nexperia B.V.
- Type: Subsidiary
- Industry: Semiconductors
- Founded: 2017; 9 years ago, after its divestiture from NXP Semiconductors
- Headquarters: Nijmegen, Netherlands
- Area served: Worldwide
- Key people: Stefan Tilger (CEO a.i.)
- Products: Discretes, Logic and MOSFET devices
- Production output: 100 billion units (2022)
- Revenue: US$2.1 billion (2022)
- Number of employees: 14,000 (2024)
- Parent: Wingtech Technology
- Website: www.nexperia.com

Nexperia B.V. is a semiconductor manufacturer headquartered in Nijmegen, the Netherlands. It is a subsidiary of Wingtech Technology, a Shanghai-listed company partially owned by the Chinese government. In October 2025, the Dutch government briefly took control of governance of the firm, citing security concerns. Since then, its Chinese operations operate as a de facto independent entity. It has front-end factories in Hamburg, Germany, and Greater Manchester, England. It is the former Standard Products business unit of NXP Semiconductors (previously Philips Semiconductors). The company's product range includes bipolar transistors, diodes, ESD protection, TVS diodes, MOSFETs, and logic devices.

== History ==
Nexperia is a second-generation spin-off of Philips' semiconductor division, whose history dates back to the 1920s when Philips acquired vacuum tubes manufacturer Mullard, whose facility in Hazel Grove became today's Nexperia Manchester, and Valvo in Hamburg. In the early 1950s, Philips started with the production of semiconductors in Nijmegen and Hamburg, where the Nexperia wafer fab is located. In 1981, Philips opened a factory in Cabuyao, Philippines. The fab is owned and operated by Nexperia. In 1991, Philips founded ITEC, a manufacturer of semiconductor equipment. Today, ITEC is an independent subsidiary of Nexperia. Philips and Motorola established the Semiconductor Miniature Products factory in Seremban Malaysia in 1992 as a joint venture, which became part of Nexperia.

In 2006, Philips spun off its semiconductor division under the name NXP and sold an 80.1% stake to private equity investors. In August 2010, NXP completed its initial public offering and its shares were listed on the Nasdaq. On June 14, 2016, NXP Semiconductors announced an agreement to divest its Standard Products business to a consortium of Chinese financial investors consisting of Beijing Jianguang Asset Management Co., Ltd ("JAC Capital"), a subsidiary of a Chinese state-owned investment company, and Wise Road Capital LTD ("Wise Road Capital"). Following the official transaction on February 6, 2017, Nexperia became an independent company, and the entire scope of the NXP Standard Products business, including its management team, and approximately 11,000 NXP employees were transferred from NXP to Nexperia.

On October 25, 2018, Nexperia was acquired by Wingtech Technology, a partially state-owned Chinese ODM for smartphone companies for $3.6 billion. Wingtech is partially owned by the State-owned Assets Supervision and Administration Commission of the State Council (SASAC).

In January 2023, Dutch public broadcaster Nederlandse Omroep Stichting reported that Nexperia chips ended up in Russian military kit despite international sanctions during the Russian invasion of Ukraine. Nexperia transceivers were discovered in a Russian Kh-101 missile, according to the Royal United Services Institute.

In March 2024, Nexperia's servers were affected by a ransomware attack in which intellectual property was stolen.

In September 2026, Nexperia entered a strategic partnership with Tata Electronics to manufacture and package semiconductor products in India. Under the agreement, Nexperia's power-control chips at Tata Electronics' semiconductor fabrication facility in Dholera, Gujarat while assembly and testing would be conducted at Tata Electronics' facility in Jagiroad, Assam. The companies also agreed to cooperate on future technology development.

=== Dutch government intervention ===
In October 2025, the Dutch Ministry of Economic Affairs took control of Nexperia's governance using the powers of the Goods Availability Act, citing national security and European economic security. According to NRC, government insiders said the move meant to prevent Nexperia from leaking chip-related intellectual property and moving operations to China. According to CNN, the Dutch government acted following pressure from Washington, which the Dutch government denies. At the time, Nexperia chips were etched on wafers in Hamburg, Germany, which were primarily packaged in Dongguan, China. The Chinese government subsequently banned Nexperia from exporting the locally packaged products (about 70% of Nexperia's EU production), triggering a chip shortage for several EU carmakers.

On 19 November 2025, the Dutch government suspended its control of Nexperia's governance. Some sales of Nexperia chips resumed, but they were reportedly being "drip-feed" to European firms. In November 2025, Wingtech filed a challenge against the Dutch government in the Supreme Court of the Netherlands. In February 2026, a Dutch court ordered an investigation into mismanagement at Nexperia. In May 2026, Wingtech filed a lawsuit against Nexperia, seeking US$1.2 billion compensation for alleged losses. In August 2026, a Chinese court ordered freezing of US$300 million in Chinese Nexperia assets. Around the same time, Zhang Qiuming, CEO of Nexperia China announced launching three new product lines to be produced on a 12-inch wafer process, as opposed to Nexperia's 6 and 8 inch production lines in Europe. In October 2026, Nexperia filed a lawsuit in a Dutch court against Wingtech and its founder.

=== Philippines ===
Nexperia has been accused of labor violations at its facility in the Philippines. On December 17, 2024, four officials of the Nexperia Philippines Inc. Worker's Union, an affiliate of the Metal Workers Alliance of the Philippines and the Kilusang Mayo Uno, were dismissed by the company amid an ongoing collective bargaining association. The officials were accused of obstructing entry and exit points to the factory. Trade union members reported layoffs and management interference in a strike vote earlier that year.

== Acquisitions ==
In 2021, the company purchased the Inmos microprocessor factory in Newport, Wales. On 17 November 2022, the British government ordered Nexperia to divest 86% of its ownership interest in the Newport facility, citing national security reasons around the company's ownership. Nexperia subsequently engaged New York law firm, Akin Gump to act on their behalf in their application for a judicial review of the UK government's divestment decision. In November 2023, Nexperia agreed to sell the facility to Vishay Intertechnology for $177 million. In March 2024, the UK government approved the acquisition of the Newport wafer fab, as announced by Secretary of State Oliver Dowden.

In November 2022, Nexperia acquired the Delft-based manufacturer of power management integrated circuits, Nowi. Subsequently, the Dutch government announced that it would investigate Nexperia's acquisition of Nowi on national security grounds. In November 2023, the Dutch government approved Nexperia's acquisition of Nowi.

== Products ==
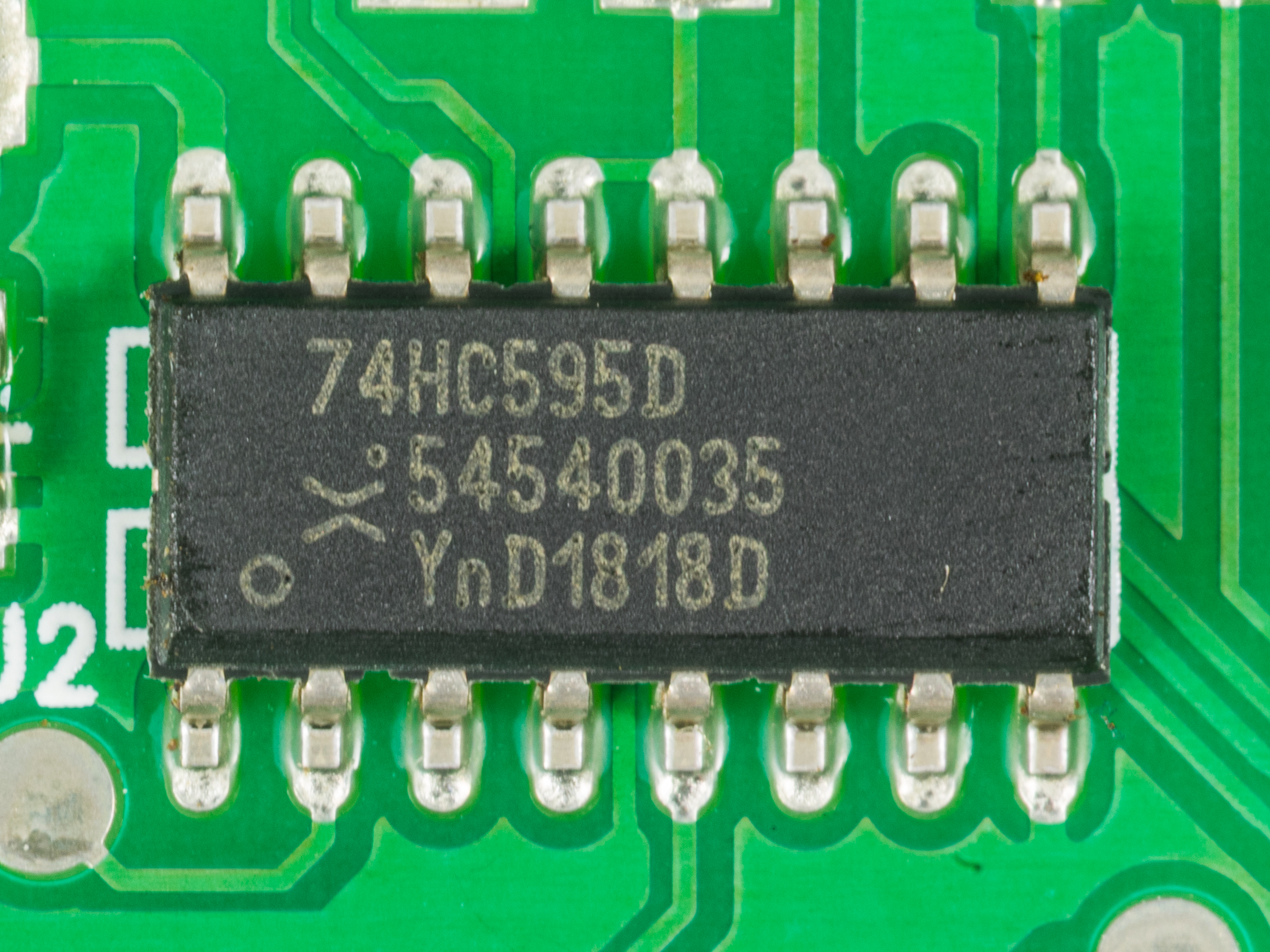
A 7400 Series integrated circuit manufactured by Nexperia

Nexperia focuses on discrete semiconductors with basic functions. These essential semiconductors are combined with more complex chips to form electronic circuits. They are used in the automotive industry as well as other industrial, mobile and consumer products. Nexperia's products include 650V silicon carbide Schottky diodes, bipolar transistors as well as 650V GaN FETs, MOSFETs like the NextPower series, or the PMCB60XN, which at launch was the most energy efficient 30V MOSFET on the market. LED drivers are offered with a side-wettable flank since 2020 and since 2023 the company produces 600V IGBTs with low switching losses and conduction. Further products include ESD protection devices, Transient Voltage Suppressor Diodes, electromagnetic interference (EMI) filter as well as load switches. In July 2024 the company launched the NPS3102 family of e-Fuses, which, unlike traditional fuses, can be used multiple times. The B-series can attempt to reset itself after a fault, while the A-series requires a manual reset.

Nexperia also cooperates with other firms like Mitsubishi Electric or Kyocera AVX Components to develop products such as SiC power semiconductors or SiC rectifier modules. Following the acquisition of Nowi, Nexperia also offers energy harvesting PMICs designed to complement or replace batteries in low power applications such as wearables. The first energy harvesting chip released by Nexperia was the NEH2000BY in April 2023.

== Locations ==
Nexperia is headquartered in Nijmegen, the Netherlands, with manufacturing and research and development facilities in Europe, the United States and Asia. It has front-end factories in Hamburg, Germany, Greater Manchester, England, and assembly and testing facilities in Guangdong, China, Seremban, Malaysia, and Cabuyao, Philippines.

Nexperia also has R&D facilities in:

- Nijmegen, Delft (the Netherlands)
- Hamburg, Munich (Germany)
- Stockport, (United Kingdom)
- Dallas (United States)
- Penang (Malaysia)
- Osaka (Japan)
- Hong Kong, Shanghai, Shenzhen (China)

== Sponsorships ==
In May 2024, Nexperia became the main sponsor of the NEC Nijmegen association football club for the 2024/2025 season. According to De Gelderlander, the deal was signed to extend for at least three years.

Nexperia and other sponsors are supporting the TeamNL House initiative, located in the Parc de la Villete in Paris, which will allow Dutch fans to watch the 2024 Summer Paralympics live and honor participating athletes.

In April 2024, Nexperia became the main sponsor of the Hamburg Towers basketball club. The sponsorship will continue at least until the end of the 2026/2027 season.
