= Clean growth =

Economic growth that minimises environmental harm

Clean growth is goal 7 of the UN's sustainability goals, first published in 2009. Clean growth refers to economic growth that is energy efficient, uses sustainable agricultural practices, and uses renewable energy technologies according to the 'Poles' outlined in the UN's Sustainable Development Goals. In other words, it is economic growth tied to conscious and sustainable principles with the aim of reducing, minimising, or eliminating altogether (where possible) the potential negative side effects that economic and income growth can have on the environment.

In accordance with these standards, governments and institutions around the world are developing policies and putting pressure on industries, businesses, and consumers to work towards economic growth that is both sustainable and clean, but doing so without compromising an individual nation's healthy income growth. The purpose of 'clean growth' is to improve the overall standard of living and quality of life of people around the world by developing policies that ensure increased positive impacts and decreased negative effects resulting from increased economic growth around the globe. The term serves to marry two concepts often held in opposite regard: economic growth and sustainability; and do so in a way that ensures neither is compromised.

Nicolas Sarkozy outlined the term well when he advocated for the need to consider the environment and economic growth in tandem, as not being contradictory but complementary:

"Our first goal is to find the way to achieve "clean" growth and I want to defend this idea here today. We haven't got to choose between saving the planet and growth. We need to have growth and save the planet. So we need a growth that consumes less energy and fewer raw materials. A new economy must be invented."

Not only does he outline the term clearly, but he also suggests that clean growth is a new way of approaching economic growth that requires both strategic resource and economic management as well as innovative technologies. The transition into clean growth economies, considering current technology trends and consumer preferences, could be very seamless as well.

The term 'clean growth' has been used as a means of redefining the value of economic growth and development. Sheer increases in income, as represented by GDP growth, have proven to be insufficient in measuring overall quality of life; and while economic growth is a good thing, the speed at which growth occurs has, historically, taken precedence over the quality of economic development. This focus on speed and quantity of growth has resulted in numerous negative side effects, particularly: pollution, greenhouse gas emissions, and resource depletion. Today, with the consequences felt, sustainability has taken a priority.

Governments and international organisations alike are developing policies to ensure cleaner and more sustainable growth for the future. A statement made by the UN's Under-Secretary General, Liu Zhenmin, regarding clean growth: "The technology for worldwide energy connectivity is there. The barriers are institutional, not technological." The UN representative, further reinforces the current economic climate which is already both innovative and geared towards clean growth and positive environmental impact; Zhenmin points out, however, that policies on a global level, as well as on a national and corporate level need to be redefined and geared toward fostering clean economic growth. Institutions are slow to change and if they do not change appropriately, can remain a hindrance against and inevitably slow the transition to clean growth and sustainability worldwide. Liu called for a change in mindset, stressing that "decisive progress can only be made through partnerships that mobilise and share knowledge, expertise, technology and financial resources are indispensable to success."

Energy Efficiency

Energy and, in particular, renewable energy are key to clean growth. According to the UN Under-Secretary General, "Without increased access to modern energy, energy efficiency and renewable energy, there will be no progress on climate action." Energy is the engine to a thriving economy, between life essentials such as cooking food or providing heating in homes and buildings, to industrial machines and transportation modes — economies today depend completely on energy. In terms of economic growth, energy is essential, but energy can also be one of the most detrimental factors to the environment, which is why clean energy is so central to clean growth around the world.

Sustainable agriculture

Sustainable agriculture is fundamental. Food security and basic needs must be met in order for a society to survive and be able to thrive. Agriculture provides food and food products, as well as textiles. These products fulfil the basic needs of society and in many cases is that which the nation's economy is based. Sustainable agriculture suggests farming in ways that meet societal needs without compromising the needs of future generations. Agriculture, despite being essential, can be very detrimental to the environment; through overcropping (depleting nutrients in the soil), overgrazing, de-foresting (cutting down trees for farming land and for lumber), depletion of water resources, and pesticide use which pollutes the surrounding soil and water. Thus, sustainable agriculture is when a society manages its land and resources in a way that meets current societal and economic needs yet does not compromise future societal and economic needs. It is an essential aspect of clean growth.

Renewable energy technologies

Renewable energy is energy that is achieved through renewable sources such as sun, wind, and rain; as opposed to energy derived from oil or natural gas, which are non-renewable and can be depleted if overused. Transitioning to renewable energy solves two problems: the problem of depleting non-renewable resources and the problem of pollution as an offshoot of using non-renewable sources.

The 'clean growth' concept is changing the way governments, institutions, industries, businesses, and people around the world perceive economic growth and the way they approach it. Clean growth is seen as a very positive and valuable approach to economic development that encourages, promotes, and fosters a sustainable and clean future without undermining the need for and value of overall economic growth and development.

Clean Growth Progress Report 2019

According to the United Nations' Report of the Secretary General, the 2019 progress toward Goal 7, clean growth initiative, was as follows:

- "The global electrification rate rose from 83 per cent in 2010 to 87 per cent in 2015, with the increase accelerating to reach 89 per cent in 2017. However, some 840 million people around the world are still without access to electricity.
- "The global share of the population with access to clean cooking fuels and technologies reached 61 per cent in 2017, up from 57 per cent in 2010. Despite this progress, close to 3 billion people still rely primarily on inefficient and polluting cooking systems.
- "The renewable energy share of total final energy consumption gradually increased from 16.6 per cent in 2010 to 17.5 per cent in 2016, though much faster change is required to meet climate goals. Even though the absolute level of renewable energy consumption has grown by more than 18 per cent since 2010, only since 2012 has the growth of renewables outpaced the growth of total energy consumption. E/2019/68 14/39 19-07404
- "Global primary energy intensity (ratio of energy used per unit of GDP) improved from 5.9 in 2010 to 5.1 in 2016, a rate of improvement of 2.3 per cent, which is still short of the 2.7 per cent annual rate needed to reach target 3 of Sustainable Development Goal 7."

== See also ==
- Green economy

== Articles ==
- Articles on CleanTech Growth
