= SIM ejector =

Tool used to eject SIM cards from mobile devices

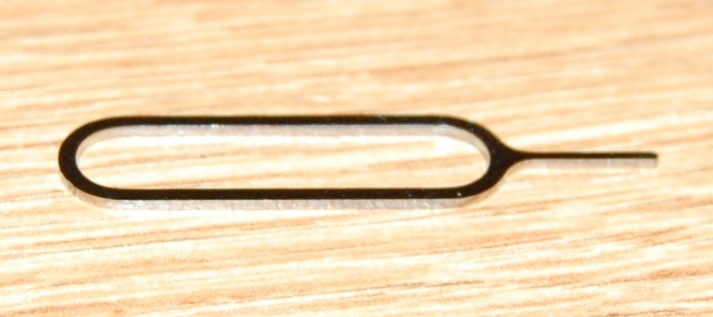
A typical metal SIM ejector tool.

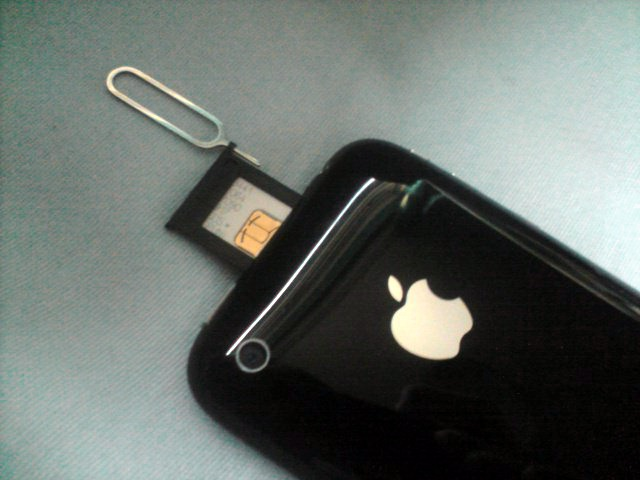
An iPhone 3G with the SIM card slot extended and the SIM ejector.

A SIM ejector or SIM ejector pin is a small tool or pin, usually made of metal, designed to remove the SIM card tray from smartphones, tablets, and other mobile devices. Modern devices often use slim, side-mounted trays instead of removable backs, and the SIM ejector allows users to access the tray without damaging the device.

SIM ejector tools are included with most new devices, especially smartphones from companies such as Apple, Samsung, and Huawei. When inserted into the tray's small pinhole, the tool releases a spring-loaded mechanism or lever inside, allowing the tray to pop out. In absence of the official tool, thin objects like paperclips or safety pins are often used, although they carry a small risk of damaging the tray.

== Overview ==
The SIM ejector became widely used as smartphones evolved to be thinner and more compact. Early mobile phones required the battery to be removed to access the SIM card, but side-mounted trays with ejector mechanisms allowed slimmer designs. Apple Inc. filed a patent (U.S. Patent 9,787,342) for a SIM ejection mechanism that could include levers, pivots, or springs, demonstrating the technical innovation behind the simple tool. Other patents describe internal push-rods and integrated mechanisms that eliminate the need for external tools.

== Usage ==
The SIM ejector is generally safe to use when gentle pressure is applied. The tool should be inserted straight into the tray's pinhole to avoid damaging the internal mechanism. Excessive force or incorrect insertion, such as angling the tool, can damage the tray or the phone's internal components unintentionally.

In situations where the official SIM ejector is unavailable, users may use thin objects such as straightened paperclips or needles. While this method can work, caution is necessary to avoid bending the tray or scratching the device.
