= Luxshare =

Chinese electronic components manufacturer

Luxshare Precision Industry Co. Ltd.
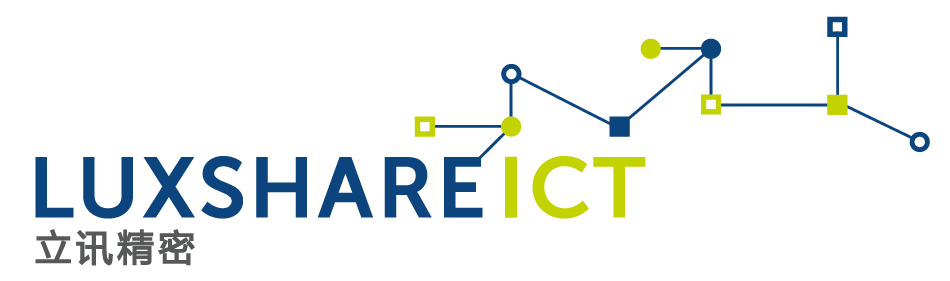
- Native name: 立讯精密工业股份有限公司
- Type: Public
- Traded as: SZSE: 002475; CSI A50; SEHK: 2475
- Industry: Electronic connector manufacturing
- Founded: 2004; 22 years ago
- Founder: Wang Laichun
- Headquarters: Bao'an, Shenzhen, Guangdong, China
- Products: Electronic components
- Revenue: US$ 32,759 million (2023)
- Net income: US$ 1,547 million (2023)
- Total assets: US$ 22,823 million (2023)
- Number of employees: 232,585 (2023)
- Website: www.luxshare-ict.com

Luxshare Precision Industry Co. Ltd. (also known as Luxshare-ICT) is a Chinese electronic components manufacturer, headquartered in Bao'an, Shenzhen, Guangdong. It has been listed on the Shenzhen Stock Exchange since 2010.

== History ==
Wang Laichun is the company's chairwoman and co-founder. Wang founded Luxshare after ten years at Foxconn. Her brother, Wang Laishen, is Luxshare's vice chairman and is also ex-Foxconn. Wang Laichun's leadership style is seen as similar to that of Foxconn's Terry Gou.

Luxshare was founded in 2004 in Dongguan, China. It designs and manufacturers computer cables; it is also a key assembler of AirPods for Apple Inc. The company has been listed publicly on the SME board of the Shenzhen Stock Exchange since 2010.

In 2020, Luxshare became an iPhone assembler after acquiring two iPhone assembly plants from Wistron.

In 2022, Luxshare was accused by Taiwanese prosecutors of stealing trade secrets from competitor Catcher Technology and of hiring much of the latter's China based research and development team, which is alleged to have allowed Luxshare rapidly to enter Apple's supply chain.

During the 2022 COVID-19 protests in China, Luxshare was reported by The Wall Street Journal to have gained an additional foothold in Apple's supply chain following protests at a Foxconn factory in the Zhengzhou Airport Economy Zone, benefitting from Apple's own investment and supply chain management staffing to take over orders with little delay.

As of July 2023, Luxshare was reportedly the initial and only contract manufacturer for Apple's Vision Pro spatial computer.

In August 2025, Luxshare filed for a secondary listing on the Hong Kong Stock Exchange.

== See also ==
- Pegatron
