= Vertu =

Hong Kong manufacturer and retailer of luxury mobile phones

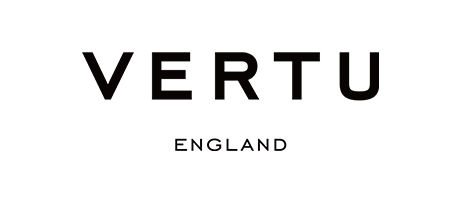
- Type: Subsidiary
- Industry: Telecommunications
- Founded: 1998; 28 years ago
- Founder: Nokia
- Defunct: 13 July 2017; 9 years ago
- Fate: Bankruptcy (Hong Kong-based unit acquired and relaunched by Baferton Co, Ltd. in 2017)
- Headquarters: Tsim Sha Tsui, Kowloon, Hong Kong
- Area served: Worldwide
- Products: Luxury mobile phones
- Number of employees: 200
- Parent: Vertu International Corporation Limited

Vertu (stylised VERTU) is a Hong Kong based manufacturer and retailer of luxury mobile phones. The company was originally established in London in 1998 as a subsidiary of the Finnish telecommunications company Nokia.

== History ==
=== Nokia ownership (1998–2012) ===
Vertu was established in 1998 as a subsidiary of the Finnish mobile phone manufacturer Nokia. It was founded by Nokia's head designer, Frank Nuovo, with its headquarters and manufacturing facilities located in Church Crookham, Hampshire, England.

The company launched its first device, the Signature, in Paris in 2002. This was followed by the release of the Ascent in 2004 and the Constellation in 2006. In 2010, Vertu introduced its first smartphone, the Constellation Quest, which operated on the Symbian system.

=== EQT ownership and Android transition (2012–2015) ===
In 2012, Nokia completed the sale of Vertu to the Swedish private equity group EQT VI. Following the acquisition, Vertu shifted its product line to the Android operating system. The company's first Android device, the Vertu TI, was launched in February 2013. Subsequent models under EQT's ownership included the Signature Touch (2014) and the Aster (2014).

=== Ownership changes and operational restructuring (2015–2017) ===
The company underwent further ownership changes, first being sold by EQT to the Hong Kong-based fund Godin Holdings in 2015. In March 2017, the company was acquired by Turkish businessman Hakan Uzan.

Later that year, in July 2017, it was widely reported that Vertu Corporation Ltd, the company's UK-based manufacturing arm, would cease its operations. This resulted in the closure of the Church Crookham factory.

=== Relaunch under new direction (2018–present) ===
The Vertu brand was relaunched under new ownership in 2018. A new device, the Aster P smartphone, was introduced in October 2018.

The brand has since released devices incorporating newer technologies. In 2020, Vertu launched the Metavertu, a smartphone marketed with Web3 features. In 2025, it launched the Quantum Flip, a foldable smartphone.In May 2026, Vertu announced the AlphaFold, a book-style foldable smartphone that included an AI assistant called Hermes Agent.

== Products ==
Vertu's product range has included feature phones, smartphones, foldable phones, and various electronic accessories.

=== Mobile phones ===
==== Feature phones and early smartphones ====
- Signature (2002): The company's first device. It was a feature phone known for its keypad, which used ruby bearings underneath each key. The phone was constructed from materials such as a titanium chassis, sapphire screen, and a ceramic earpiece.
- Ascent (2004): A model with a design that incorporated elements from sports cars, such as a stainless steel body and leather accents.
- Constellation Classic (2006): A feature phone with a ceramic keypad and a world clock application.
- Ascent Ti (2007): A version of the Ascent built with a Grade 5 titanium body.
- Constellation Ayxta (2009): The company's first flip phone.
- Constellation Quest (2010): Vertu's first smartphone, which ran on the Symbian operating system. It featured a full QWERTY keypad with keys made from sapphire.
- Constellation V (2011): Vertu's first full-touchscreen smartphone.

==== Android smartphones ====
- Vertu TI (2013): The first Vertu device to run on the Android operating system.
- Signature Touch (2014): An Android smartphone that combined features of the original Signature, such as a ceramic earpiece and ruby key for concierge access, with a 4.7-inch sapphire touchscreen. The camera optics were reportedly certified by Hasselblad.
- New Signature Touch (2015): An updated model with a larger 5.2-inch sapphire screen and a gull-wing door mechanism for the SIM and memory card slots.
- Aster P (2018): A smartphone launched after the brand's relaunch, which also featured the gull-wing door design.
- iVertu (2021): A smartphone marketed towards a younger demographic.
- Metavertu (2022): A device marketed as a "Web3 phone" with the ability to switch between two different operating systems.
- Metavertu 2 (2023): A successor model with a ceramic and titanium body, marketed with artificial intelligence (AI) related features.
- Agent Q (2025): A high-end smartphone model developed and manufactured by Vertu. Announced in 2025, it is the first device released by the company positioned as an "AI Agent Phone," integrating a proprietary AI system designed for business users.

==== Foldable phones ====
- Ayxta Fold (2020): A 5G-capable phone with a horizontally folding 7.8-inch flexible display.
- Ironflip (2024): A vertically 5G folding phone.
- Quantumflip (2025): A vertically folding phone marketed with a focus on quantum encryption technology.
- AlphaFold (2026): A book-style foldable 5G smartphone with an 8.05-inch internal display and a 6.53-inch external display. The device includes Hermes Agent, an AI assistant marketed for app automation and enterprise-system workflows.

=== Other electronics and accessories ===
Vertu has also marketed a range of other electronic products and accessories under its brand.

- Wearables: This includes smart rings, such as the Vertu AI Diamond Ring (2024) and Vertu AI Aura Ring(2025), and smartwatches like the MetaWatch (2022) and Grand Watch (2024).
- Audio Devices: The product line includes wireless earbuds, such as the Vertu England Hifi Lucky Buds.
- Accessories: The brand has offered accessories, including phone cases, sunglasses, bags, and fountain pens.

=== Collaborations and limited editions ===
Vertu has released several limited-edition devices in collaboration with individuals and for special events.

- Michelle Yeoh (2009): A special edition of the Constellation Vivre was released in partnership with actress Michelle Yeoh.
- Seal (2010): A version of the Constellation Quest was created in collaboration with musician Seal.
- Wissam Shawkat (2014): A Signature Touch edition featured hand-engraved Arabic calligraphy by artist Wissam Shawkat.
- Vertu Agent Q 27th Anniversary Limited Edition (2025): In 2025, Vertu released the Agent Q 27th Anniversary Limited Edition, a variant of the Agent Q model restricted to a production run of 27 units worldwide, with each unit featuring an engraved Vertu Serial Number (VSN).

== Design and manufacturing ==
Vertu phones were hand-assembled in the company's workshops in Hampshire, England. The manufacturing process involved the use of materials such as aerospace-grade metals and exotic leathers, combined with techniques associated with jewellery-making and watchmaking.

=== Materials ===
Vertu is noted for incorporating a range of materials not typically used in mass-market mobile phones into its product designs.

==== Sapphire crystal ====
Since the release of the Signature model in 2002, the company has used synthetic sapphire for the screens of its devices, citing the material's high scratch resistance (9 on the Mohs scale). The 2015 New Signature Touch featured a 5.2-inch curved display made from a single piece of sapphire crystal.

==== Liquidmetal ====
The 2006 Ascent Racetracks Edition was one of the first mobile phones to use Liquidmetal, an amorphous metal alloy, in its construction. The material was selected for its reported strength and corrosion resistance.

==== Exotic leathers ====
The exterior casings of many Vertu devices are finished with various types of exotic leathers, such as alligator, ostrich, and other reptile skins. The company has stated that its process involves hand-cutting and stitching the leather components for each phone.

==== Ruby bearings ====
Inspired by watchmaking, ruby bearings have been placed under the keypads of certain models, such as the Signature. This feature was intended to affect the keys' tactile response and durability.

==== Ceramic components ====
Ceramic has been used for specific components in Vertu phones. It was first used for the earpiece ("pillow") on the 2002 Signature model, selected for its acoustic properties and wear resistance. The 2023 Metavertu 2 model later featured a frame constructed from ceramic.

==== Titanium ====
The 2007 Ascent Ti model featured extensive use of Grade 5 titanium in its body. This alloy is known for its high strength-to-weight ratio and is also used in the aerospace and medical industries.

==== Carbon fibre ====
The 2013 Vertu Ti model, featured components made from carbon fibre.

=== Design and features ===
- "V" Symbol: A recurring "V" shape is a design element integrated into the physical features of many Vertu phones.
- Design Iispirations: The company has cited various sources of inspiration for its designs, including sports cars (Ascent series), aeronautics (Constellation series), and architecture (iVertu).
- Ruby key: A physical key made of ruby was included on models beginning with the 2014 Signature Touch, functioning as a dedicated button to access the company's concierge service.
- Gull-wing mechanism: The 2015 New Signature Touch featured a gull-wing door mechanism for its SIM card compartment, which the company stated was inspired by the doors of the Mercedes-Benz 300 SL.

=== Audio ===
Vertu commissioned exclusive ringtones for its devices. The ringtones for the Signature phone were composed by Academy Award-winning composer Dario Marianelli and featured flute solos by Andrea Griminelli.

=== Artistic collaborations ===
Vertu has released numerous limited-edition devices in partnership with artists and artisans. Notable collaborations include:

- Japanese lacquer art (2014): A series created by Japanese lacquer artist Kazumi Murose using traditional maki-e and raden techniques.
- Arabic calligraphy (2014): A partnership with calligrapher Wissam Shawkat, which featured hand-engraved designs on Signature Touch devices.
- Yosegi-zaiku woodcraft (2015): The Vertu Aster Yosegi Wood model incorporated Japanese Yosegi-zaiku wood marquetry.
- Leather art (2016): The Aster Leaf collection was created in collaboration with leather artist Carina Sohl.

== Concierge Service ==
A key feature of Vertu ownership is its Concierge Service, a 24/7 lifestyle management assistance program. The service is accessible via a dedicated button, Ruby Key, often made of ruby, located on the side of many Vertu phones. Pressing the button connects the user to a personal concierge team that can handle a range of requests.

=== Service functions ===
The service is structured to assist several categories. These include:

- Travel and logistics: Arranging travel, including private aviation, securing hotel and restaurant reservations, and providing support during emergencies or travel disruptions.
- Business and security: Facilitating business-related requests and arranging personal security services through third-party providers.
- Health and wellness: Coordinating access to medical services, including consultations and international medical transport.
- Cultural and educational access: Arranging private access to cultural institutions or specialised educational services.

=== Device customisation ===
The concierge service has also been used to facilitate bespoke device customisations. This has included commissioning phones made with non-standard materials, such as meteorite fragments, or arranging for personalised engravings by specialised artisans.

== Information security ==
Vertu has marketed its devices with an emphasis on enhanced security features, targeting clients concerned with privacy and data protection. The security approach reportedly incorporates both hardware and software measures.

=== Hardware and software features ===
According to company information, Vertu's security architecture has included several key components:

- Secure element (SE) chip: Certain Vertu models are equipped with a dedicated secure element chip, a hardware component physically isolated from the main application processor. This chip is designed to store sensitive data such as cryptographic keys and biometric information in a protected environment.
- Multiple operating systems: Some later models, such as the Metavertu, were marketed as having the capability to run multiple, isolated operating systems on a single device. This feature was designed to allow users to separate sensitive activities from everyday use.
- Encrypted communications: The company has offered end-to-end encrypted communication services for voice calls and messaging between Vertu devices.
- Distributed data storage: Vertu has also promoted a decentralized data storage solution, described as using blockchain principles to fragment and store encrypted user data across multiple nodes.

=== Data deletion features ===
Vertu has features for emergency data deletion. There is something called Ghost System that offers a one-click erasure of all sensitive data stored on the Vertu smartphone.

== Distribution and brand collaborations ==
Vertu's corporate strategy has included strategic partnerships and collaborations. Vertu has stated that these alliances are intended to extend its brand reach, incorporate craftsmanship from other luxury sectors, and create limited-edition products.

=== Retail distribution ===
Vertu has utilised a selective retail model, focusing on branded stores, dedicated retail spaces in major cities, and online stores. Vertu's retail locations have included stores in Dubai, Bangkok, Vietnam, Kuwait, Uzbekistan, Azerbaijan, Turkmenistan, Qatar, Poland, Bulgaria, Beijing, Shanghai, Nanjing, and Macau.

=== Brand collaborations ===
The company has engaged in a number of collaborations with other brands, particularly in the automotive industry.

==== Automotive partnerships ====
Ferrari (2007–2010): A partnership with Ferrari resulted in several co-branded mobile phones.

- Ascent Ferrari (2007): This model incorporated leather from Ferrari steering wheels and featured design elements such as the Prancing Horse emblem and rosso corsa red colouring. It also included Ferrari engine sounds as ringtones.
- Constellation Quest Ferrari (2010): This device used materials such as carbon fibre and titanium coated in diamond-like carbon (DLC). Its software interface was designed to resemble a car's instrument cluster and included performance-tracking applications.

Bentley (2014–2019): A five-year partnership with Bentley Motors produced a line of "Vertu for Bentley" smartphones.

- Signature Touch for Bentley (2014): This model featured Bentley's diamond-quilted leather and design elements intended to mirror the controls and colour schemes of Bentley car interiors.
- New Signature Touch for Bentley (2015): A subsequent model that included an audio system reportedly tuned by a Bentley audio engineer and a custom Bentley-themed navigation interface. Production was stated to be limited to 500 units.
