= List of orthopedic implants =

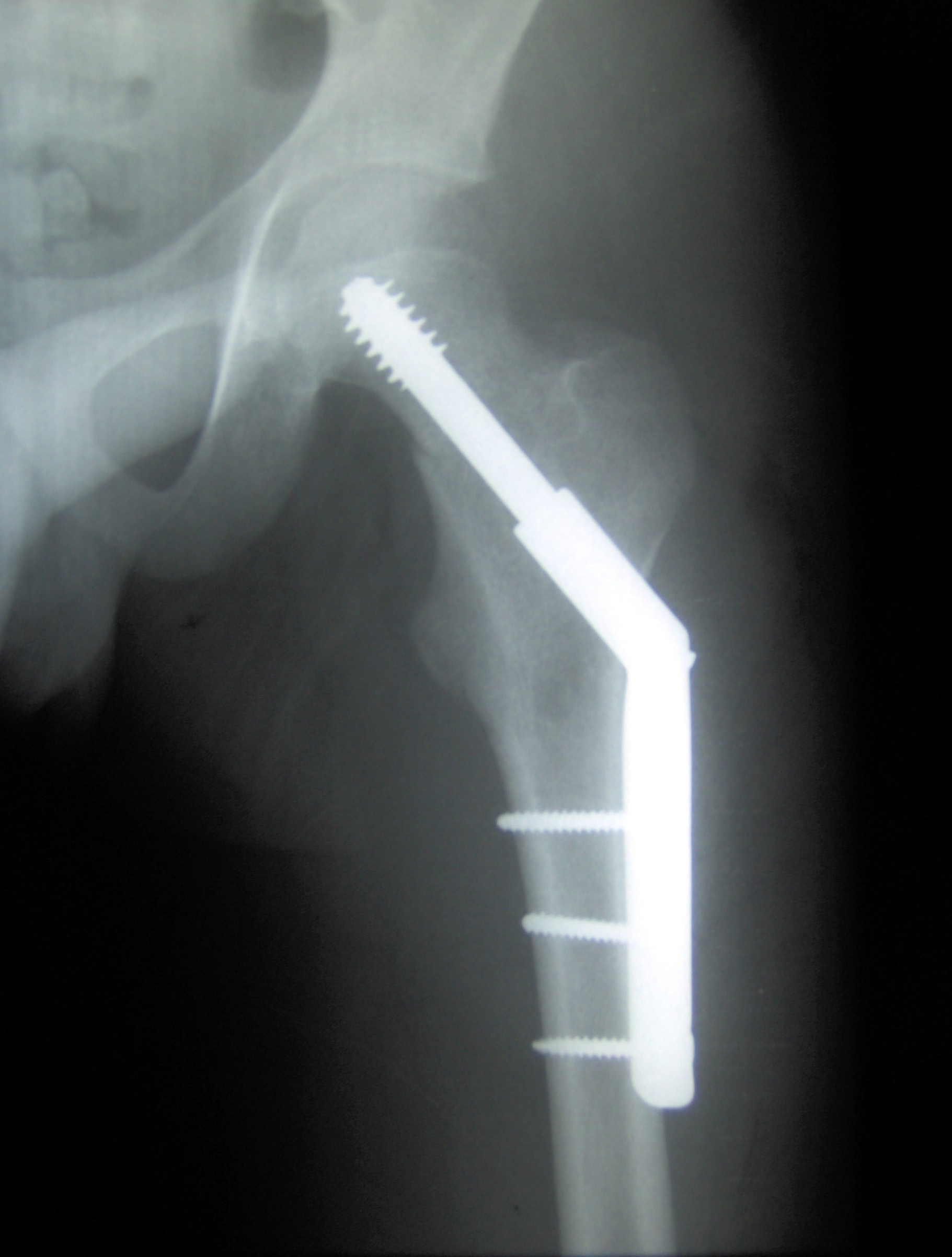
Orthopedic implant example seen with X-ray

An orthopedic implant is a medical device manufactured to replace a missing joint or bone, or to support a damaged bone. The medical implant is mainly fabricated using stainless steel and titanium alloys for strength and the plastic coating that is done on it acts as an artificial cartilage. The biodegradable metals in this category are magnesium-based and iron-based alloys, though recently zinc has also been investigated. Currently, the uses of bioresorbable metals are as fracture fixation implants Internal fixation is an operation in orthopedics that involves the surgical implementation of implants to repair a bone. During the surgery of broken bones through internal fixation the bone fragments are first reduced into their normal alignment then they are held together with the help of internal fixators such as plates, screws, nails, pins, and wires. Additionally, composite materials are in development; screws are placed first whereafter the composite construct is made.

== Eponymous implants and their uses ==
- Austin-Moore prosthesis for fracture of the neck of the femur
- Baksi's prosthesis for elbow replacement
- Charnley prosthesis for total hip replacement
- Condylar blade plate for condylar fractures of the femur
- Ender's nail for fixing intertrochanteric fracture
- Grosse-Kempf nail for tibial or femoral shaft fracture
- Hansson pin (or LIH for Lars Ingvar Hansson), a hook-pin used for fractures of the femoral neck
- Harrington rod for fixation of the spine
- Hartshill rectangle for fixation of the spine
- Insall Burstein prosthesis : for total knee replacement
- Richard N.W. Wohns interspinous implant and implantation instrument intended to be implanted between two adjacent dorsal spines
- Kirschner wire for fixation of small bones
- Kuntscher nail for fracture of the shaft of the femur
- Luque rod: for fixation of the spine
- Moore's pin for fracture of the neck of the femur
- Neer's prosthesis for shoulder replacement
- Rush nail for diaphyseal fractures of a long bone
- Smith-Petersen nail for fracture of the neck of femur
- Smith-Petersen nail with McLaughlin's plate for intertrochanteric fracture
- Seidel nail for fracture of the shaft of the humerus
- Souter's prosthesis for elbow replacement
- Steffee plate for fixation of the spine
- Steinmann pin for skeletal traction
- Swanson prosthesis for the replacement of joints of the fingers
- Talwalkar nail for fracture of radius and ulna
- Thompson prosthesis for fracture of the neck of the femur

== Branded Systems ==
		Waldemar Link	DePuy Synthes	Vast Ortho	Stryker	Smith & Nephew	Biomet	Orthofix	Zimmer
Elective	Total Hip Replacement	Lubinus SP II		Austin Moore Bipolar Thompson	Exeter Accolade				
Elective	Hip hemiarthroplasty								
Elective	Hip resurfacing					Birmingham			
Elective	Total Knee Replacement	Gemini Endo-Model	Sigma Attune		Triathlon Scorpio	Journey Legion Genesis II	Vanguard VanguardXP		NexGen Persona
Elective	Unicompartmental knee arthroplasty	Sled					Oxford		
Elective	Shoulder/Elbow/Ankle Replacement								
Trauma	Femoral Nail		Expert LFN/RAFN/ALFN PFNA TFN	PFNA PFNA II TFN	Gamma nail	Intertan nail			ZNN System, NCB System
Trauma	Tibial Nail		Expert tibia nail	Tibia Nail	T2 tibia nail				ZNN System, NCB System
Trauma	External fixation			Ilizarov Ring Clamp Trocar	Hoffmann II	Taylor spatial frame Ilizarov JET-X		TrueLok Hex Galaxy	
Trauma	Locking Plates (LCP)			2.4mm Locking 2.7mm Locking 3.5mm Locking 4.5/5.0mm Locking					
Trauma	Angled Plates			Angle Blade Plate Condylat Plate DHC, DCS Jewett Nail Plate					
Trauma	Spine			Anterior Cervical Plate Monoaxial Screws Polyaxial Screws Cages Mesh					

== Image Gallery ==
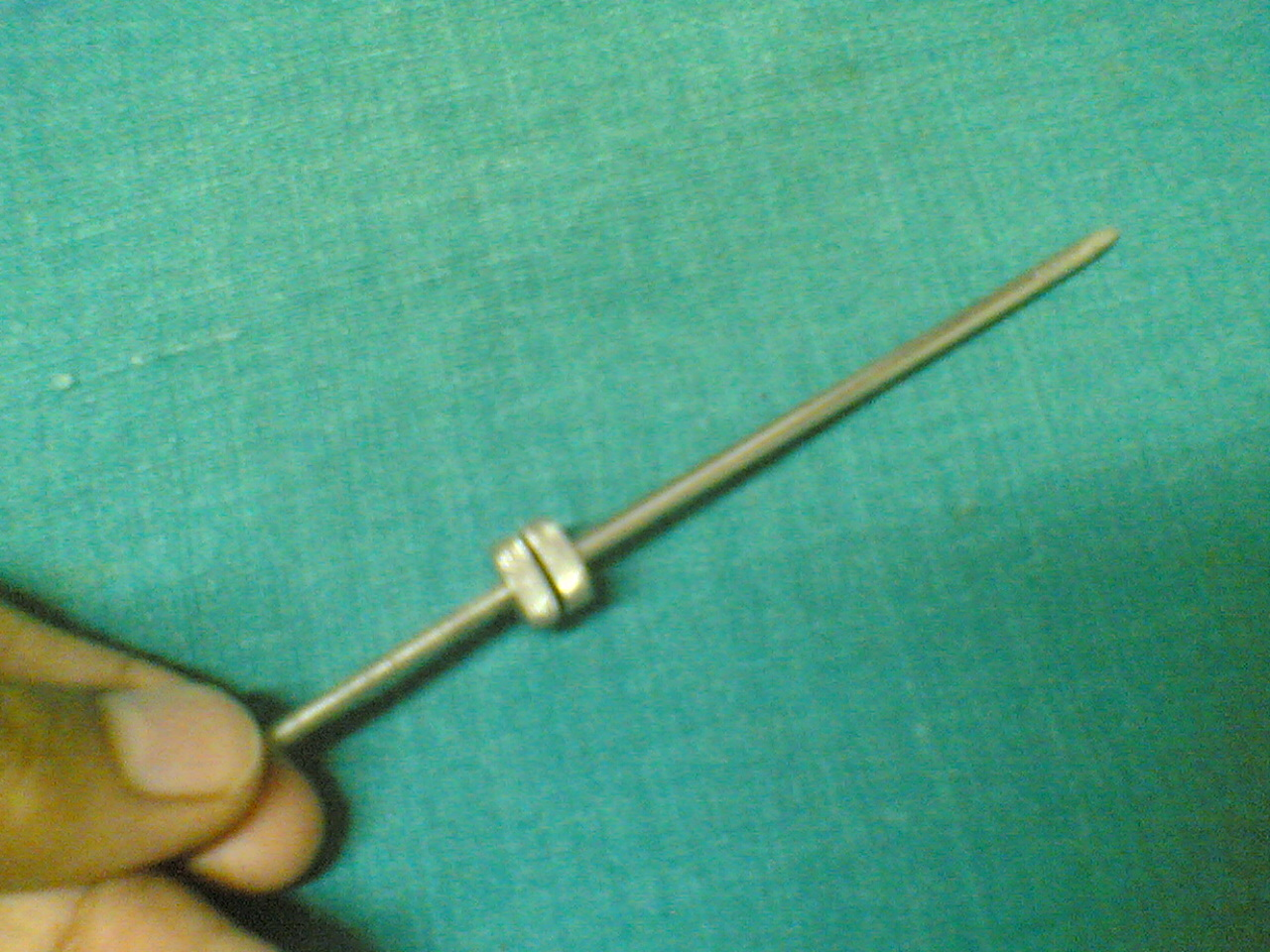
Moore's pin

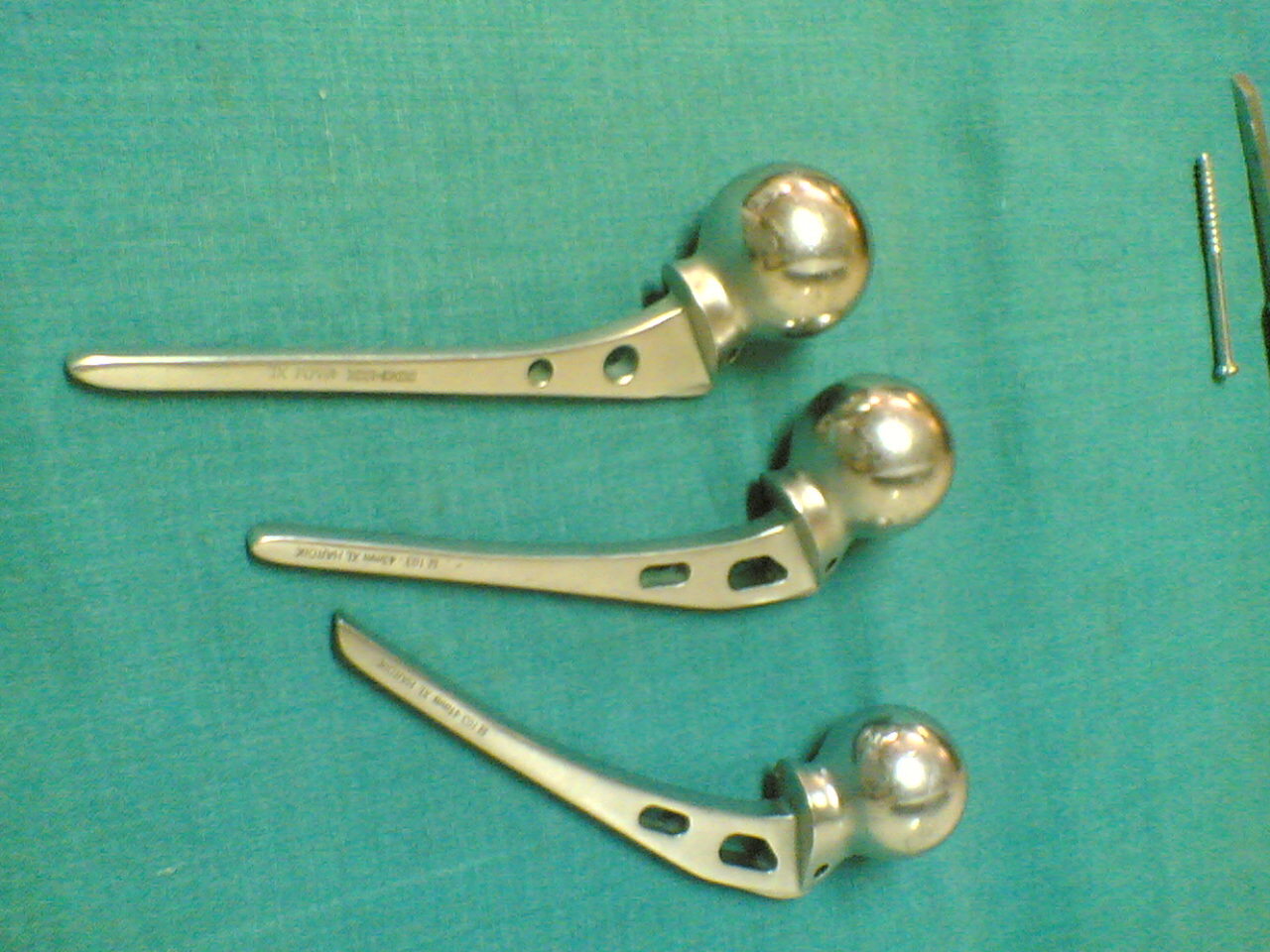
Austin Moore prostheses

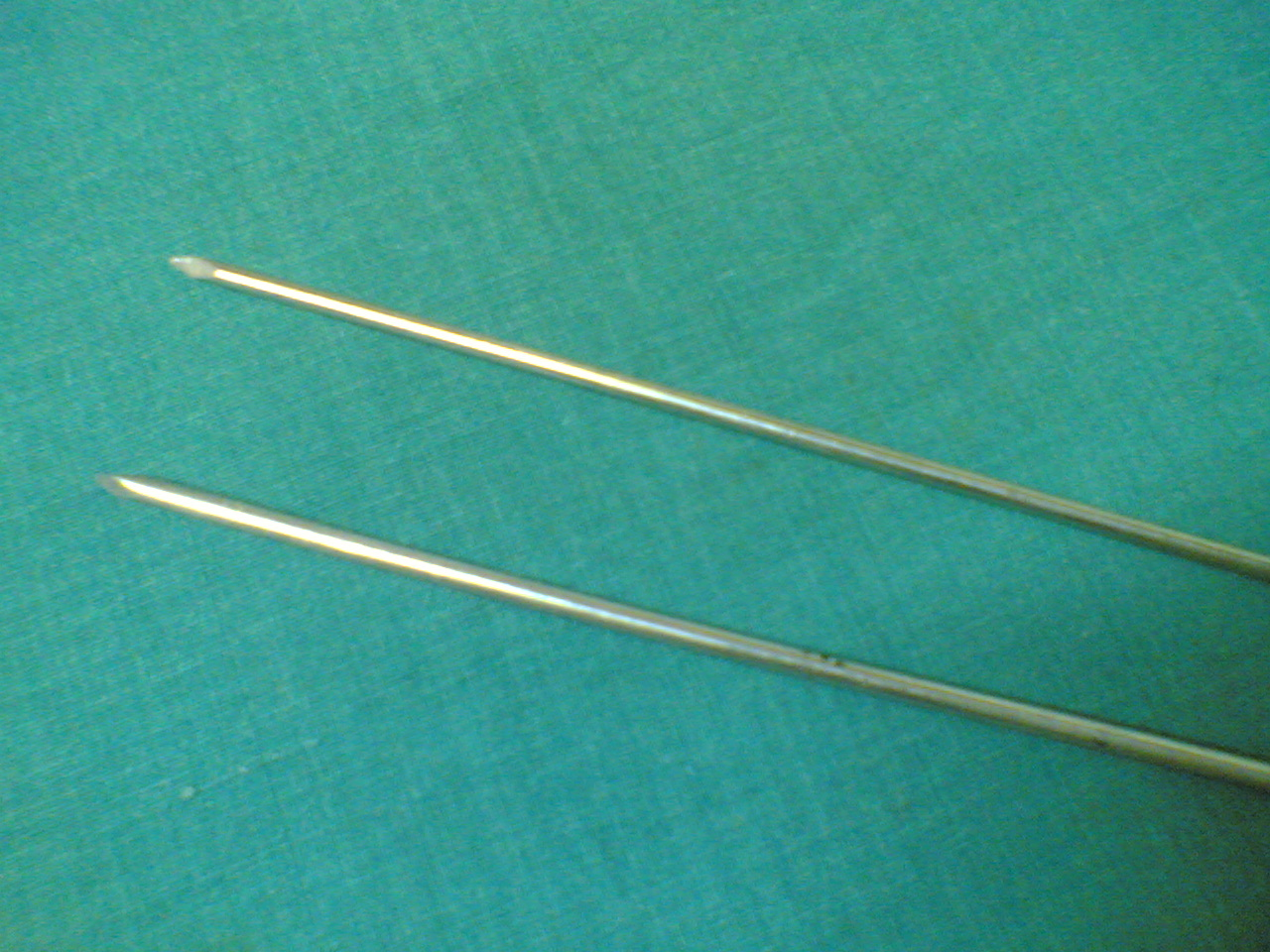
Steinman pins

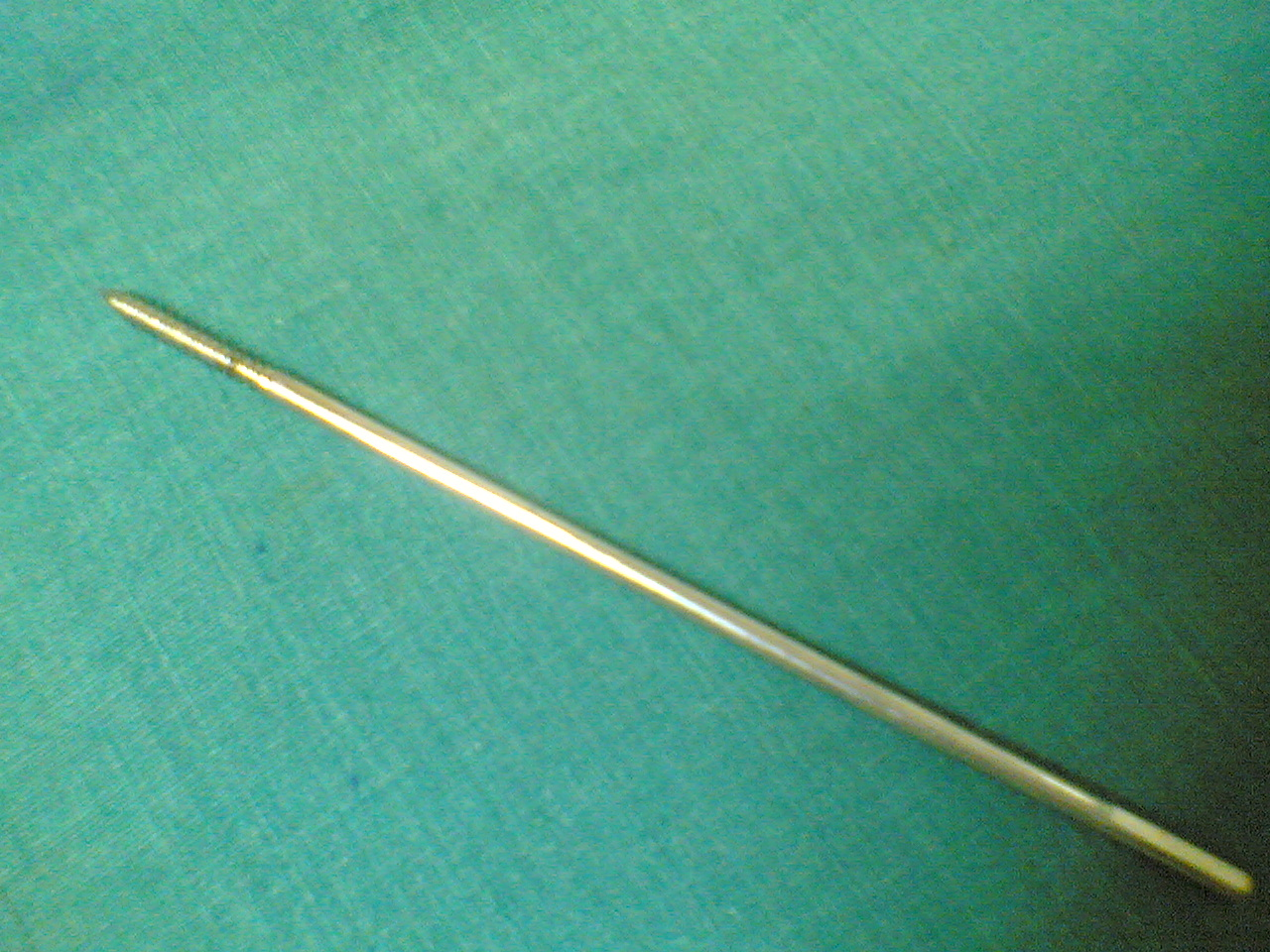
Shan's pin

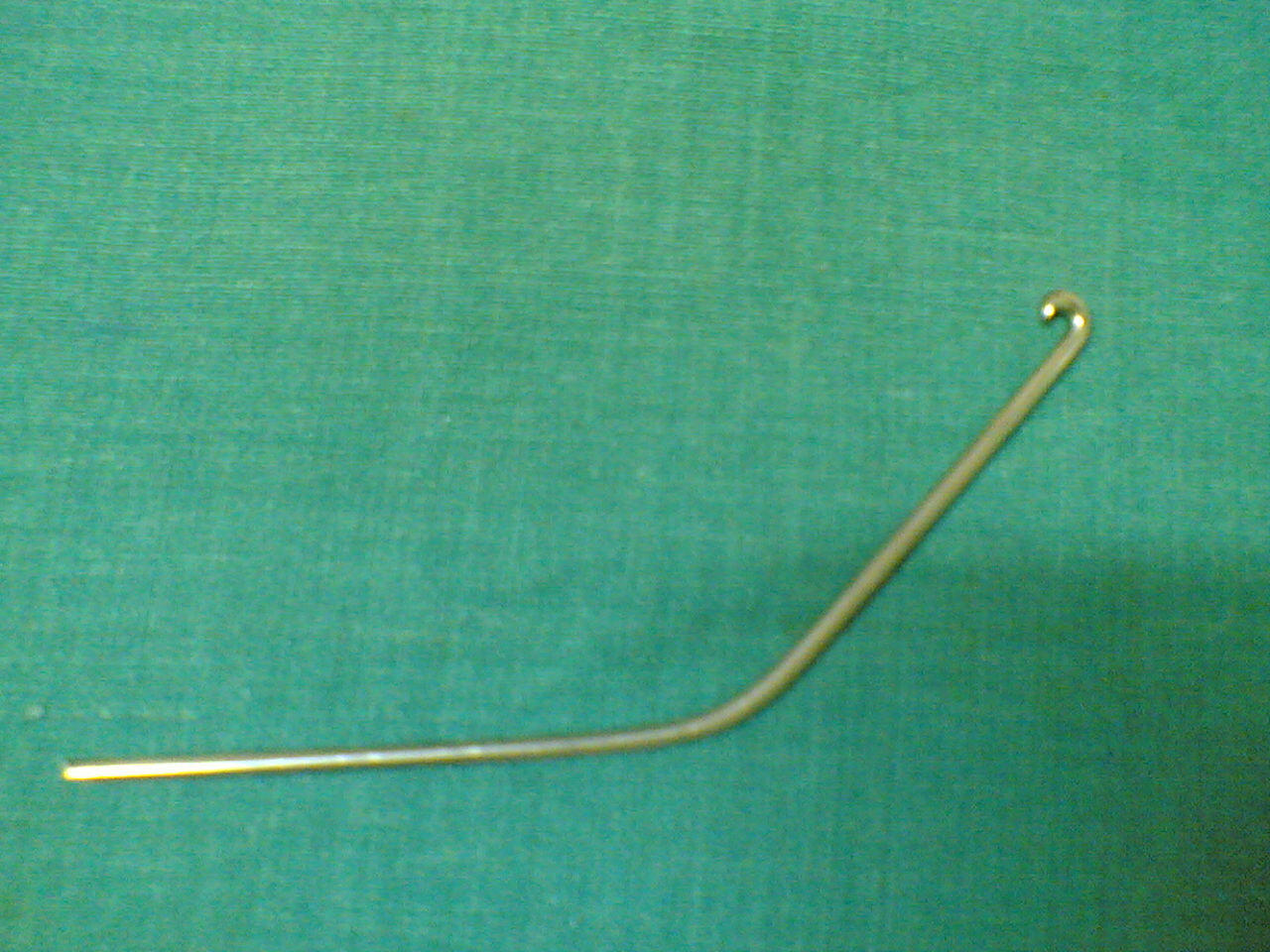
Rush nail

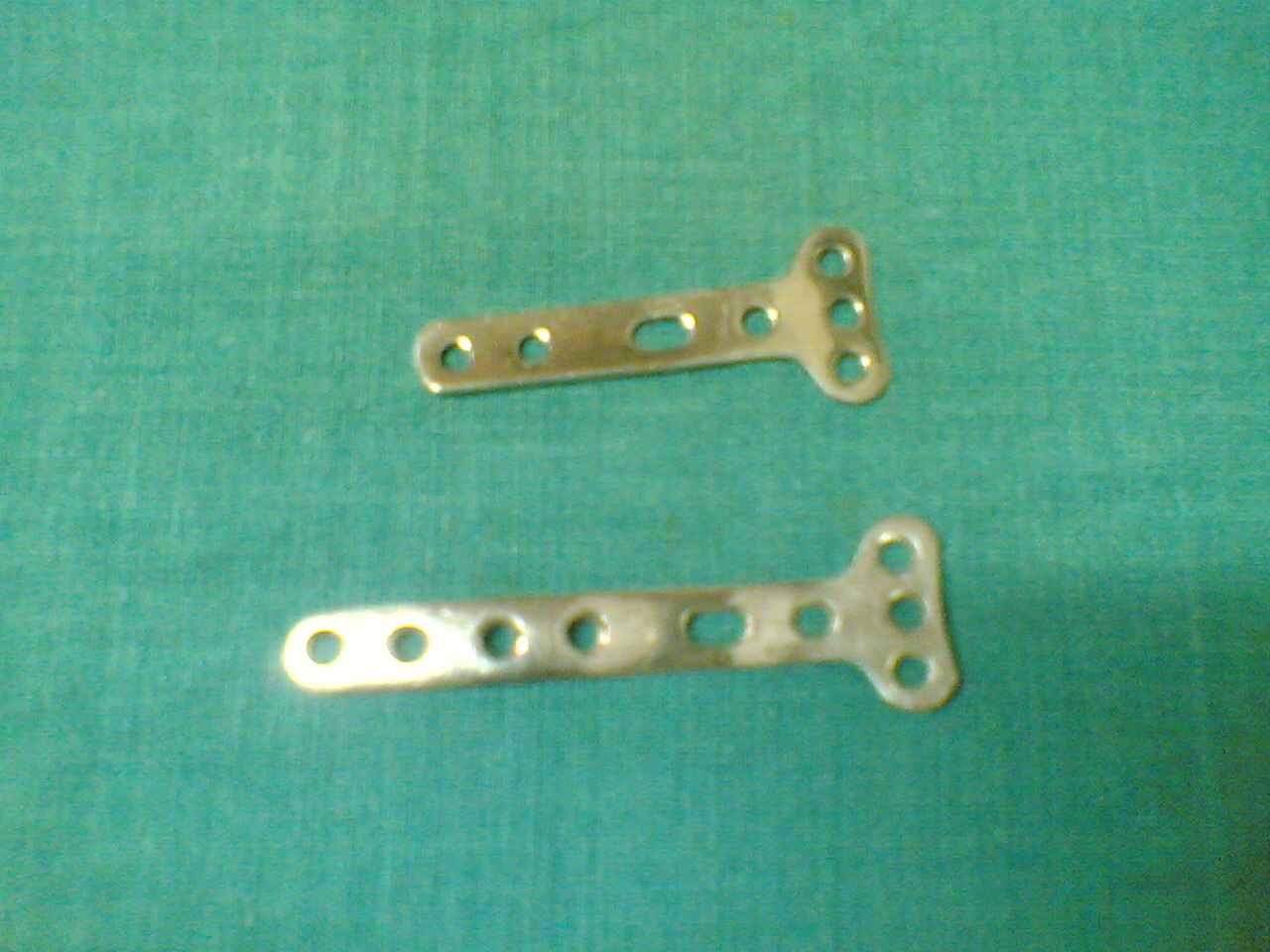
Buttress plates

== Research progress ==
The discipline of orthopedic implants is constantly evolving as new biomaterials become available. An important consideration in this respect is that the health status of the patient influences the optimal choice of the material to be implanted. For instance it was shown that patients with steatotic liver disease benefit from nanohydroxyapatite-coated (nHA) titanium surfaces, whereas this is not necessary for patients without fatty liver disease. A surface engineering method was developed for biodegradable magnesium alloys to enhance orthopedic implants.

== See also ==
- CNT Bio-Stress Sensors
