= Bioabsorbable metallic glass =

Bioresorbable (or bioabsorbable) metallic glass is a type of amorphous metal, which is based on the Mg-Zn-Ca ternary system. Containing only elements which already exist inside the human body, namely Mg, Zn and Ca, these amorphous alloys are a special type of biodegradable metal.

== History ==
The first reported metallic glass was an alloy (Au_{75}Si_{25}) produced at Caltech by W. Klement (Jr.), Willens and Duwez in 1960. This and other early glass-forming alloys had to be cooled extremely rapidly (in the order of one mega-kelvin per second, 10^{6} K/s) to avoid crystallization. An important consequence of this was that metallic glasses could only be produced in a limited number of forms (typically ribbons, foils, or wires) in which one or more dimensions were small so that heat could be extracted quickly enough to achieve the necessary cooling rates. As a result, metallic glass specimens (with a few exceptions) were limited to thicknesses of less than one hundred micrometers.

Mg-Zn-Ca based metallic glasses are a relatively new group of amorphous metals, possessing commercial and technical advantages over early compositions. Gu and co-workers produced the first Mg-Zn-Ca BMG in 2005, reporting high glass forming ability, high strength and most importantly exceptional plasticity. This lanthanide-free, Mg-based glass attracted immediate interest due to its low density and cost, and particularly because of its uncharacteristically high ductility. This property was unexpected for such compositions, as the constituent elements are found to be of relatively low Poisson ratio, and hence contribute little to the inherent plasticity of the glass. This unlikely asset was seized upon by Li in 2008, who made use of the Poisson ratio principle and increased Mg content at the expense of Zn to further enhance plasticity. Further improvements were achieved by incremental addition of Ca to the Mg_{72}Zn_{28} binary composition, producing numerous ternary alloys along the 350 °C isotherm of the Mg-Zn-Ca system.

Ternary Ca-Mg-Zn bulk metallic glasses were also discovered in 2005. Similar to the Mg-Zn-Ca, these two amorphous alloys are both bioresorbable metallic glasses and are based on the same Mg-Zn-Ca ternary system. The elements are displayed in order of decreasing atomic concentration. Hence, the distinction between these two metallic glasses lies in their most dominant element, namely Ca and Mg. These Ca-based bulk glassy alloys had compositions of Ca_{55}Mg_{15+x}Zn_{30-x}, Ca_{60}Mg_{10+y}Zn_{30-y}, and Ca_{55+z}Mg_{25-z}Zn_{20}, where x = 0, 5 and 10; y = 0, 5, 7.5, 10, and 15; and z = 0, 5, 7.5, 10, and 15. Critical casting thicknesses of up to 10 mm were achieved.

== Properties ==
Unlike traditional steel or titanium, this material dissolves in organisms at a rate of roughly 1 millimeter per month and is replaced with bone tissue. This speed can be adjusted by varying the content of zinc.

Amorphous Ca_{65}Zn_{20}Mg_{15} alloy exhibits extremely poor corrosion resistance. Wang et al. reported that the said amorphous alloy completely disintegrated after no more than 3 hours exposure in biocorrosion environment. In static distilled water at room temperature, Dahlman et al. also reported destructive corrosion reactions of the same material, decomposing into a multiphase powder.

Ca-BMGs with higher Zn contents as reported by Cao et al. showed an elastic modulus in the range of 35–46 GPa, and a hardness of 0.7–1.4 GPa.

== Recent developments ==
Metallic glasses based on the Mg-Zn-Ca ternary alloy system only consist of the elements which already exist inside the human body. As such, it is being explored as a potential bioresorbable biomaterial for use in orthopaedic applications.

== See also ==
- Bioresorbable stents
- Materials science
