= LIH =

LIH may refer to:

- Andrew Lih, American author of The Wikipedia Revolution
- Lihue Airport, Kauaʻi, Hawaiʻi, US, IATA code
- LIH pin, an orthopedic hook-pin
- Lithium hydride, LiH
- GM E-Turbo engine, engine for cars that can be referred to as LIH
