= Amorphous metal transformer =

Type of electric transformer

An amorphous metal transformer (AMT) or amorphous core transformer is a type of energy efficient transformer found on electric grids. The magnetic core of this transformer is made with a ferromagnetic amorphous metal. The typical material (Metglas) is an alloy of iron with boron, silicon, and phosphorus in the form of thin (e.g. 15-25 μm) foil rapidly cooled from melt. These materials have high magnetic susceptibility, very low coercivity and high electrical resistance. The high resistance and thin foils lead to low eddy currents losses when subjected to alternating magnetic fields. On the downside amorphous alloys have a lower saturation induction and often a higher magnetostriction compared to conventional crystalline iron-silicon, grain oriented electrical steel.

== Transformer low and high load losses ==
At a constant power rating, AMTs are more efficient at both low and high loads, though AMT's require a larger core, due to the amorphous material's lower saturation induction and higher magnetostriction, and increased winding material resulting in a larger transformer size and weight .

=== No-Load or Low Load ===
In a transformer the no-load or low load loss is dominated by the core loss. With an amorphous core, no/low-load core loss can be 70–80% lower than with traditional crystalline materials.

=== High Load ===
In a transformer the high load loss is dominated by copper winding resistance, thus called copper loss. At high loads the lower saturation magnetization of both amorphous and electrical steel cores tend to result in a increasing lower efficiency as the transformer approaches full load. To minimise heavy load loss more copper and core material are necessary at a consequence of transformer increased size and weight.

== Cost ==
In 2026 when considering the same power rating, an AMT costs more than a traditional transformer due to expensive:

- amorphous core material
- fragile handling requirements of the core material (Metglas)
- increased copper winding to compensate for core material's higher magnetorestriction

== Applications ==
The main application of AMTs are the grid distribution transformers rated at about 50–1000 kVA. These transformers typically run 24 hours a day and at a low load factor (average load divided by nominal load). The no load loss of these transformers makes up a significant part of the loss of the whole distribution net.

Amorphous iron is also used in specialized electric motors that operate at high frequencies of perhaps 350 Hz or more.

== Advantages and disadvantages ==
More efficient transformers lead to a reduction of generation requirement and, when using electric power generated from fossil fuels, less CO_{2} emissions. This technology has been widely adopted by large developing countries such as China and India. AMT are in fact more labour-intensive to manufacture than conventional distribution transformers, a reason that could explains a very low adoption in the comparable (by size) European market. These two countries can potentially save 25–30 TWh electricity annually, eliminate 6-8 GW generation investment, and reduce 20–30 million tons of CO_{2} emission by fully utilizing this technology.
