= Structural rejuvenation =

Structural rejuvenation is a change in bulk metallic glasses which, among other consequences, improves their plasticity.

There are two kinds of structural rejuvenation: homogeneous and inhomogeneous.
