= Cambridge Semiconductor Limited =

UK business

CamSemi
- Industry: Semiconductors
- Founded: Cambridge, UK (2002 with A round funding)
- Headquarters: Cambridge, United Kingdom
- Number of locations: Taipei, Taiwan (2007); Shenzhen, China (2008); Hong Kong (2011)
- Products: Power management ICs
- Website: CamSemi.com

Cambridge Semiconductor Limited (CamSemi) is a fabless semiconductor business based in Cambridge, England that was acquired by US-based competitor Power Integrations Inc., in January 2015.

The company specialises in power management integrated circuits and was spun out of Cambridge University in August 2000 with seed investment from the Cambridge University Challenge Fund, as a commercial venture arising out of the research conducted by Professors Gehan Amarantunga and Florin Udrea at the Cambridge University Engineering Department.

CamSemi is developing a range of new ICs for use in power conversion products such as mains power supplies and lighting. The company’s products are enabling power supply manufacturers to develop low cost products that comply with Energy Star, the European code of conduct and related energy-efficiency regulations. All CamSemi products are based on a proprietary portfolio of technologies and topologies including advanced control architectures, RDFC and PowerBrane.

The company’s venture capital investors included DFJ Esprit, Scottish Equity Partners and cleantech investors The Carbon Trust and NES Partners.

== Launched products ==
- C2470 mixed signal controllers and RDFC (Resonant Discontinuous Forward Converter) topology for switched-mode power supplies (SMPS)
- C2140, C2150, C2183 and C2283 primary side sensing (PSS) flyback controllers for SMPS
- C2160 and C2170 PSS flyback controller families targeting 5 star-rated mobile phone chargers with <30 mW no-load
- C5183 PSS flyback controller with active start-up for SMPS
- C3120, C3183 and C3682 LED drivers ICs for solid-state lighting

== Development milestones ==
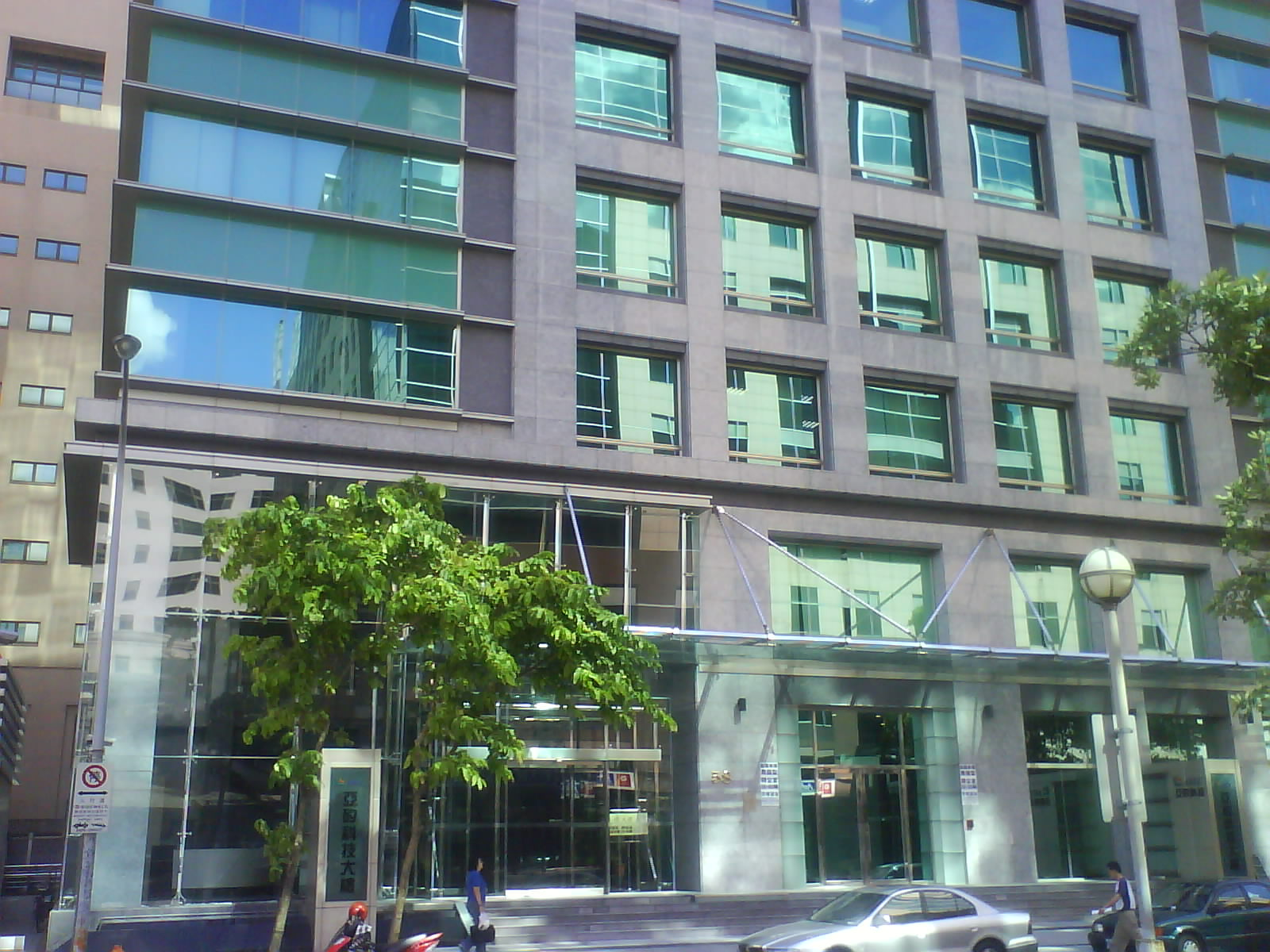
Sales and application design centre in Neihu district, Taipei.

- 2002 CamSemi secured series A funding led by 3i to raise $6.1 million.
- 2004 Announced PowerBrane, a new technology to integrate IGBTs and controllers onto the same die.
- 2007 Launched RDFC controller family Company announcement.
- Opened sales office and application design centre in Taiwan.
- 2008 Closed series C funding to raise $34 million; introduced first primary side sensing controllers and named ‘Start up of the year’ by National Microelectronics Institute Company announcement
- 2009 Named as ‘University Spin-out of the Year’ in New Energy Awards Company announcement
- Launched C2160 family of PSS controllers to help manufacturers develop power supplies with <30 mW no load power
- 2011 Awarded ‘Business Weekly’s East of England International Trade Award’ Company announcement
- 2012 Listed in 29th position in '2012 Sunday Times Hiscox Tech Track 100' report. Also Company announcement
- 2013 Awarded NMI 'Low Power Design Innovation' award for C2172 PSS controller with features to reduce no load power consumption. Also Company announcement
