= NC machine =

The term NC machine can refer to:

- Network computer
- Numerical control

== See also ==
- NC (disambiguation)
