= Energy efficient transformer =

In a typical power distribution grid, electric transformer power loss typically contributes to about 40–50% of the total transmission and distribution loss. Energy efficient transformers are therefore an important means to reduce transmission and distribution loss. With the improvement of electrical steel (silicon steel) properties, the losses of a transformer in 2010 can be half that of a similar transformer in the 1970s. With new magnetic materials, it is possible to achieve even higher efficiency. The amorphous metal transformer is a modern example.
