= Artificial cartilage =

Synthetic material

Artificial cartilage is a synthetic material made of hydrogels or polymers that aims to mimic the functional properties of natural cartilage in the human body. Tissue engineering principles are used in order to create a non-degradable and biocompatible material that can replace cartilage. While creating a useful synthetic cartilage material, certain challenges need to be overcome. First, cartilage is an avascular structure in the body and therefore does not repair itself. This creates issues in regeneration of the tissue. Synthetic cartilage also needs to be stably attached to its underlying surface i.e. the bone. Lastly, in the case of creating synthetic cartilage to be used in joint spaces, high mechanical strength under compression needs to be an intrinsic property of the material.

== Natural cartilage ==
There are three types of cartilage in the human body: fibrocartilage, hyaline cartilage and elastic cartilage. Each type of cartilage has varying concentrations of components such as proteoglycans, collagen and water which determine its functional properties and location in the body. Fibrocartilage is most often found in the intervertebral discs, elastic cartilage is found in the external ear and hyaline cartilage is found on many joint surfaces in the body. Replacement of hyaline cartilage (articular cartilage) is the most common application of synthetic cartilage.

=== Articular cartilage ===
Cartilage is an avascular, aneural and alymphatic tissue within the body. The extracellular matrix (ECM) of collagen is what gives it its high strength. The figure below shows the components of the ECM.

==== Components ====
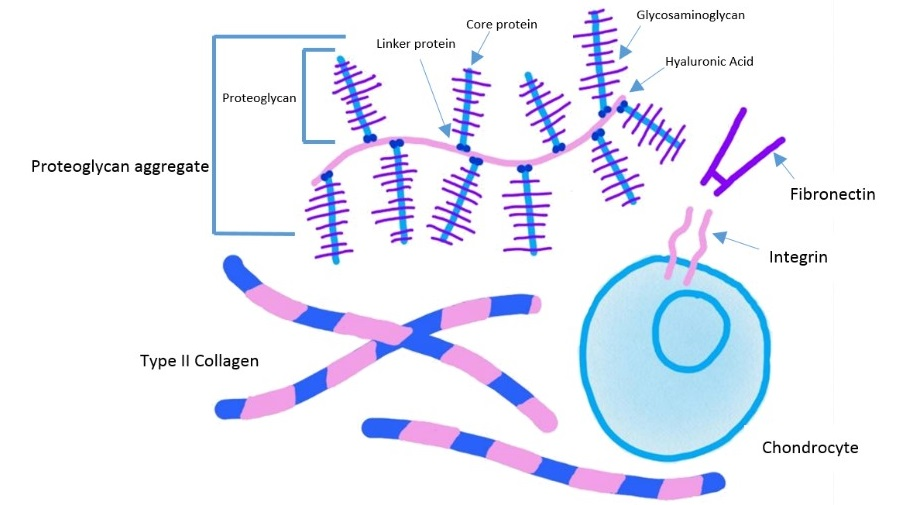
- Extracellular matrix components of cartilage including proteoglycan aggregates, collagen, integrins and fibronectin.
  Water: Water makes up around 80% of cartilage.
- Chondrocytes: Chondrocytes are the cells that produce and maintain the cartilaginous matrix. They are sparsely dispersed throughout cartilage and make up only about 2% of the total volume of cartilage. Chondrocytes vary in size, shape and concentration depending on their location in articular cartilage.
- Collagen: Collagen is a structural protein present in the extracellular matrix of cartilage. Collagen is composed of a triple helix structure of polypeptide chains and offers shear and tensile properties to the cartilage. Type II collagen is the most common type of collagen present in cartilage though types IX, X, XI, and XIV are also present. Overall, collagen is a stabilizing protein present in the ECM.
- Proteoglycans: Proteoglycans are the second most abundant macromolecule in the ECM of cartilage. Proteoglycans consist of a linker protein along with a core protein to which glycosaminoglycans (GAGs) attach. The most common GAGs are chondroitin sulfate and keratin sulfate. Proteoglycans attach to a central chain, usually hyaluronic acid, via a linker protein, to create larger proteoglycan aggregates. Proteoglycans are hydrophilic and therefore attract and restrain water molecules. This provides cartilage with its intrinsic ability to resist compression.
- Glycoproteins: Many other glycoproteins are present in cartilage ECM in small amounts that help maintain structure and organization. Specifically, lubricin helps to create a lubricating surface on the cartilage for easier joint mobility. Fibronectin and integrins other glycoproteins present that help in adhesion of chondrocytes to the ECM.

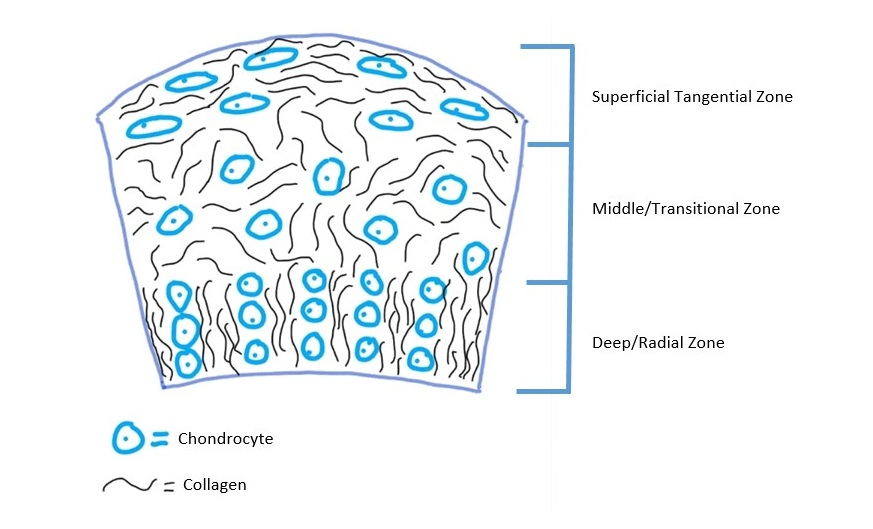
Structural zones in Cartilage including chondrocyte and collagen arrangement.

==== Structure ====
There are three structural zones in articular cartilage including a superficial tangential zone, a middle transitional zone and a deep zone. In the tangential zone, collagen fibers are aligned parallel to the surface and become gradually randomly aligned while moving into the deep zone. Collagen fibers in the superficial zone are aligned parallel to the surface in order to restrict shear stresses. Similarly, collagen fibers are aligned perpendicular to the surface in the deep zone in order to restrict compressive forces. Between bone and the deep zone lies calcified cartilage. Cell arrangement also varies between the zones, in deeper zones chondrocytes are stacked into columns while in the superficial zones they are arranged randomly. In the superficial regions the cells are also more elongated, while in deeper zones they are more spherical in nature.

== Artificial cartilage ==
Synthetic cartilage can be composed of many different materials that mimic its functional properties. Tissue engineering principles include the use of cells, growth factors, and synthetic scaffolds in order to do this.

=== Components ===
- Cells: Chondrocytes are an obvious choice to use in the regeneration of cartilage due to their ability to secrete collagen and other ECM components necessary for the functional properties of cartilage. Chondrocytes can be harvested from a non-weight bearing joint space of an individual and cultured. Unfortunately, chondrocytes harvested from individuals may dedifferentiate and lose their properties. Additionally, aging chondrocytes show less metabolic activity and may not produce functional proteins or not enough functional proteins to create a desired ECM. Mesenchymal stem cells can also be used to create chondrocytes and make cartilage regeneration possible.
- Growth factors: Growth factors can be used to induce differentiation of a cell or induce secretion of matrix proteins. Common growth factors for the application of synthetic cartilage include Insulin-growth factor 1 (IGF-1), Transforming Growth Factor β (TGF- β), Bone Morphogenic Proteins (BMP) and Growth and Differentiation Factor 5 (GDF-5).
- Human induced pluripotent stem cells (iPSCs) are an alternative cell source that have the potential to self-renew and provide an almost unlimited number of cells with pluripotent capabilities, or the ability to differentiate into many different cell types.
- Bioinks: these are the materials used to engineer artificial live tissue using 3D printing technology. Bioinks can be composed solely of cells, but are usually a combination of cells and a carrier material, often a biopolymer gel.

=== Structure ===
- Scaffolds are used in tissue engineering to create an environment with similar mechanical properties of the native tissue. Scaffolds must be biocompatible and have high compressive strength. Scaffolds can be created from hydrogels, polymers or other material. Hydrogels are lightly cross-linked polymer networks swollen with water. Degree of crosslinking, porosity, and polymer composition can be tuned to create a hydrogel with similar properties to native cartilage. Researchers have been exploring the use of hydrogels as a cartilage substitute since the 1970s.

== Function ==
Natural articular cartilage is an inhomogeneous, anisotropic, and viscoelastic tissue. The structure, described above 1.1.2. allows the cartilaginous tissue to have superior mechanical properties in order to perform the functions necessary. Synthetic cartilage will attempt to mimic the functional properties of natural cartilage, which can be broken down into two main aspects.

- Load bearing properties: One of the main functions of articular cartilage is that it has the capability to effectively transfer repeated cyclic loading to bone. This compressive load can be multiple times the body weight due to activities such as walking and running, however cartilage achieves this function by dissipating energy.
- Tribological properties: The second main function of articular cartilage is that it can have little to no wear over the course of the lifetime. It achieves this function by providing a lubricated surface with a coefficient of friction near zero. By creating a smooth surface, this lubrication prevents both cell and protein adhesion while also protecting the articular cartilage from damage.

These are important functions of cartilage because of its role as a cushion in bone articulation. When damage and degradation occurs to the articular cartilage, it can no longer withstand the large loads without pain and discomfort of the individual due to the decrease in mechanical properties.

After analyzing the load bearing and tribological properties of natural cartilage, these mechanical properties may be achieved depending on the structure and components of the hydrogel created, which will be discussed further in the Existing Methods section. These optimal properties can then be compared to the synthetic cartilage created. The properties of the hydrogels created can differ dramatically based on the components and the structure. Furthermore, it is extremely difficult to achieve all mechanical functions of natural cartilage, which is the end goal of synthetic cartilage.

When dealing with creating hydrogels, there are additional functions that must be considered. For example, the hydrogel must have the correct degradation properties in order to produce cell regeneration in the correct time frame that the hydrogel will take to degrade. Additionally, the hydrogel must not create toxic waste when degrading. These functions have been tested by comparing the stress, modulus and water content before and after implantation of different compositions of hydrogels.

== Existing methods ==
There are many existing methods concerning regenerative therapies of cartilage as well as developing new artificial cartilage. First, regenerative therapies for osteoarthritis will be discussed. There have been substantial advances in recent years in the development of these regenerative therapies. These include anti-degradation, anti-inflammation, and cell and scaffold based cartilage regeneration.

=== Anti-degradation ===
Many biological agents and chemical compounds have been used in order to prevent matrix-degrading enzymes that actively work to degrade cartilage. Monoclonal antibodies, most commonly studied being 12F4.1H7, work to specifically suppress ADAMTS-5-induced aggrecan release. This in turn helps to slow down cartilage degradation and osteophyte formation.

=== Anti-inflammation ===
Inhibiting inflammatory mediators could help prevent osteoarthritis progression. Cytokines and chemokines are both crucial in stimulating cartilage catabolism and blocking these inflammatory mediators. Studies have shown that treatment with NF-κB pathway inhibitor BAY11-7082 restores IL-1b-inhibited chondrogenesis of cartilage stem cells and in turn postpones progression of OA. Similarly, ample research shows that combined blockade of TNFa and IL-17 with bispecific antibodies reveals an inhibition of both cytokines for reduced cartilage degradation and proinflammatory responses.

=== Cell and scaffold-based cartilage regeneration ===
In order to restore joint cartilage after injury due to chondrocyte loss, cell therapy and chondrocyte replenishment has been shown to work in certain studies. Lying self-assembled MSCs (mesenchymal stem cells) on top of chondrocyte-laden hydrogel scaffolds has shown cell-mediated regeneration of hyaline-like cartilage. However, one drawback of this is that implantation of these scaffolds requires open-joint surgery to gather donor chondrocytes from non-weight-bearing joint cartilage areas. This makes it difficult to apply to the elderly.

Along with regenerative therapies there are also several studies that show ways to develop new artificial cartilage.

=== 3D woven fiber scaffold infiltrated with network hydrogels ===
One study discussed that the 3D woven fibers provide load bearing tribological properties of native cartilage where they are trying to achieve a near frictionless environment. Hydrogels are used as cell carriers because they can be readily seeded with cells. However, it is difficult to recreate both the biomechanical and chemical functions of natural tissue. Hydrogels of interpreting networks (IPN), are two different polymers mixed with one another on a molecular scale. This works to increase fracture toughness. They are ionically crosslinked networks with a special type of IPN that is capable of scattering mechanical energy while maintaining the shape of a hydrogel after deformation.

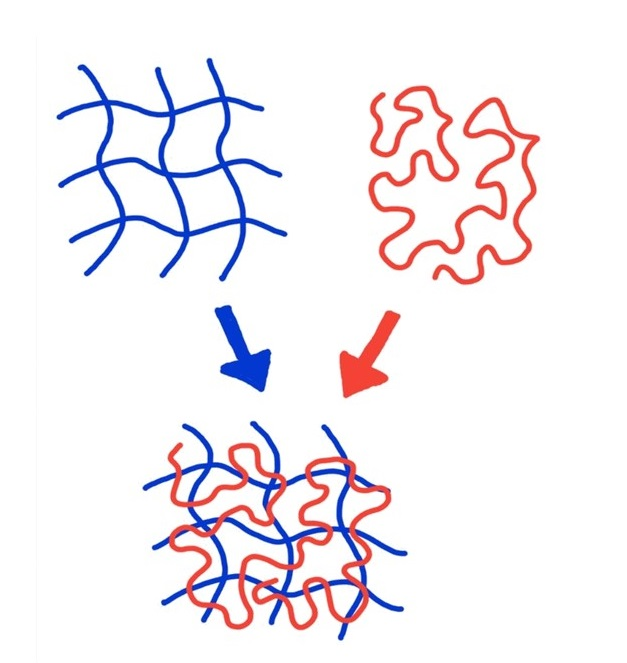
Structure of a double network hydrogel can be seen by combining the blue and red hydrogel shown.

=== Double network hydrogels ===
Similar to the previous study, double network hydrogels are used. They are composed of two kinds of hydrophilic polymers. At 6 weeks of implantation, the samples compared to those without treatment showed biodegradable properties. When using poly(2-acrylamide-2-methyl-propane sulfonic acid)/poly(N,N'-dimethyl acrylamide) or PAMPS/PDMAAm ultimate stress and tangent modulus increased. However, when using bacterial cellulose and gelatin, it showed a decrease of ultimate stress and it did not meet the requirements of artificial cartilage.

=== PVA/PAMPS hydrogel ===
In 2020, developers combined a bacterial cellulose nanofiber network with a poly(vinyl alcohol) (PVA) - poly(2-acrylamido-2-methyl-1-propanesulfonic acid sodium salt) (PAMPS) double network hydrogel. The artificial cartilage displayed the same strength and modulus as natural cartilage in terms of tension and compression, and was the first lab-created option to exhibit cartilage-equivalent tensile fatigue strength. The hydrogel needs to undergo further lab testing before researchers determine if it can be moved to clinical use. PVA hydrogels prepared by several freezing-thawing, without an externally added crosslinking agent, have also exhibited great promises in terms of biocompatibility, wear resistance, shock absorption, friction coefficient, flexibility, and lubrication (due to uptake/excretion of body fluid). A two-year implantation of the PVA gels as artificial meniscus in rabbits showed that they remain intact without degradation, fracture, or loss of properties.

=== PDMS hydrogel ===
This method uses a hydrogel that is contained within a porous, silicone-based polymer called polydimethylsiloxane (PDMS). The polymer allows the hydrogel to withstand 14-19 times more force than it could on its own.

== Clinical applications ==
Clinical application is extremely important to consider when looking at the efficacy of artificial cartilage. The recent clinical approaches for cartilage regeneration in Osteoarthritis treatment is described below.

=== MSC based therapy ===
In certain studies, matrix-induces mesenchymal stem cell implantation showed earlier clinical improvements when compared to simple implantation of chondrocytes. The MSCs promoted cartilage regeneration in knees that had osteoarthritis and also reduced pain and disability.

=== PVP/PVA hydrogels for articular cartilage replacement ===
Poly(vinyl alcohol) (PVA) hydrogels were used in this study. It was difficult to meet the mechanical properties of articular cartilage using this hydrogel. There was no inflammatory or degenerative changes in articular cartilage or synovial membrane surround this artificial PVA cartilage. PVP hydrogels were also studied. They exhibit high hydrophilicity, biocompatibility, and complexing ability. When used as a blend of PVA/PVP hydrogel, they produced similar internal 3D structure and water content as natural articular cartilage. The best mechanical properties and friction system were blended hydrogel with 1 wt. % PVP. Due to the greater inter-chain hydrogen bonding, adding PVP to the pure PVA proved a better option. They acted exactly with a characteristic viscoelastic behavior of articular cartilage.

=== Cartilage implants ===
In July 2016, the U.S. approved the use of a synthetic cartilage implant to treat arthritis in the joint of the big toe. The implant is made of saline and a bio-compatible polymer, and is inserted through an incision between the metatarsophalangeal (MTP) joint where natural cartilage has worn away. It is being researched for use in other joints. A separate orthopedic implant consisting of a hydrated, interpenetrating dual polymer network based on polyether urethane (PEU) was given breakthrough device designation from the U.S. Food and Drug Administration in July 2021.

In September 2021, researchers used nasal chondrocyte-based engineered cartilage to treat osteoarthritic joints in two patients.

=== Cartilage transplants ===
In 2021, researchers from Swansea University partnered with the Scar Free Foundation to bioprint 3D transplantable cartilage made of human stem cells and plant-based materials to give a 10-year-old girl an ear transplant. This method eliminated the need to retrieve cartilage from elsewhere on the patient's body.

== Future work ==
In terms of future work, there is still a lot to be done in this field. Artificial cartilage is a new research topic and much is still unknown. There are a lot of unknown factors involving ASCPs and more studies need to be conducted to make a more supported conclusion about the regenerative functions of ASCPs. Additionally, growth factors have been thoroughly evaluated; however, specific combinations still need to be studied further in order to more effectively generate a tissue that can mimic the properties of natural cartilage. In 2021, Marc C. Hochberg, head of the division of rheumatology and clinical immunology at the University of Maryland School of Medicine, said that the "holy grail" would be a compound that reduced cartilage degradation and/or restored normal cartilage while reducing pain.

=== 3D printing ===
In 2017, scientists from Chalmers University of Technology in Sweden demonstrated cartilage tissue engineering using 3D bioprinting. They used two different bioinks with nanofibrillated cellulose (NFC) to conduct the tests: NFC with alginate (NFC/A) and hyaluronic acid (NFC/HA). The bioinks were co-printed with irradiated human chondrocytes [8]. The team had success with NFC/A.

In September 2021, researchers created cartilage repair implants utilizing a process of three-dimensional weaving to combine artificial materials with stem cells. The bioartificial implants are designed to partly dissolve over time, leaving only natural tissues in the repaired joints. As of October 2021, scientists have seen success in treating dogs but further research is required before the technique could move to clinical trials for humans.

Also in September 2021, scientists from the Nakayama Lab at Saga University and Kyoto University in Japan fabricated 3D printed cartilage constructs from stem cells.
