= Pol Duwez =

Materials scientist

- Born: 11 December 1907
- Died: 31 December 1984 (aged 77)
- Citizenship: United States
- Education: University of Brussels
- Awards: James C. McGroddy Prize for New Materials (1980)
- Scientific career
- Fields: Materials Science
- Workplaces: California Institute of Technology
- Doctoral advisor: Émile Henriot
- Doctoral students: William Andrew Goddard III

Pol Duwez (11 December 1907 – 31 December 1984) was a Belgian-born materials scientist. While working at Caltech in 1960, he first introduced metallic glasses made through rapid liquid cooling using a technique known as splat quenching.
