= No-load loss =

No-load loss (also called "fixed loss") is a portion of the loss of electricity that does not depend on the power being distributed through an electric circuit, as opposed to the load loss. No-load loss typically depends on the operating voltage of a grid unit and can be attributed to:

- dielectric loss in cables;
- core loss in electric transformers;
- some types of losses in synchronous condensers (rotor surface losses, pulsating losses in stator teeth, and losses in the stator due to higher harmonics of the rotor field);
- loss in the electromechanical measuring devices (low, e. g. an "analog" electrical meter consumes less than 1.5 Watts of power);
- corona loss in high-voltage lines.

== See also ==
- No load power

== Sources ==
- Wu, Anguan; Ni, Baoshan (7 June 2016). Line Loss Analysis and Calculation of Electric Power Systems. John Wiley & Sons. ISBN 978-1-118-86709-9. OCLC 1062309002.
