= Bioresorbable metal =

Bioresorbable (also called biodegradable or bioabsorbable) metals are metals or their alloys that degrade safely within the body. The primary metals in this category are magnesium-based and iron-based alloys, although recently zinc has also been investigated. Currently, the primary uses of bioresorbable metals are as stents for blood vessels (for example bioresorbable stents) and other internal ducts.

== Background ==
Although bioabsorbable polymers and other materials have come into widespread use in recent years, degradable metals have just started being successfully implemented in the medical industry. Several magnesium based screws such as Syntellix AG's MAGNEZIX^{®}, U&I Corporation's K-MET, Bioretec's ReneOs Screw LAG Solid and scaffolds such as Biotronik's Magmaris and Freesolve have documented commercial distribution and clinical use. Multiple other devices are also currently under clinical trial.

=== Driving force for development ===
The driving force behind the development of bioresorbable metals is primarily due to their ability to provide metal-like mechanical properties while degrading safely in the body. This is especially relevant in orthopedic applications, such as fracture fixation where although many surgeries only require implants to provide temporary support (allowing the surrounding tissue to heal), the majority of current bio-metals are permanent (e.g. stainless steel, titanium). Moreover, permanent implants could lead to complications such as chronic inflammation, reduced bone regeneration or bone resorption due to stress shielding. Degradation of the implant means that intervention or secondary surgery will not be necessary to remove the material at the end of its functional life, providing significant savings in both cost and time for the patient and health care system. However, research is still focusing on the corrosion products of current bio-metals (which will still corrode in the body to some degree) as they can generally not be considered biocompatible.

== Potential applications ==
There are a number of applications for biodegradable metals, including cardiovascular implants (i.e. stents) and orthopedics. It is in this latter category where these materials offer the greatest potential. Bioresorbable metals are able to withstand loads that would surpass any currently available polymers, and offer much greater plasticity than bioceramics, which are brittle and prone to fracture. A well-designed implant could provide the exact mechanical support needed for different areas (through alloying and metal working), and transfer load to the surrounding tissue over time as the metal degrades, letting it heal and reducing the effects of stress shielding. A summary of the primary benefits and drawbacks of magnesium biomaterials has been provided by Kirkland.

== Considerations and issues facing bioresorbable metal development ==
=== Changing shape over time ===
It is the same advantage that bioresorbable metals possess over non-degradable current materials, their biodegradability, that poses the greatest challenges to their development and wider use. The degradable nature of any implant means that their shape and thus mechanical properties will change through its lifetime. This means that lifecycle analysis must be performed on any implant, especially one designed for orthopedic applications where failure could result in death.

=== Lack of standards ===
Current standards for corrosion of metals have been found to not apply well to bioresorbable metals during in vitro testing. This is a significant problem as the majority of tests performed in the research community are a mix of other standards from both the biomedical and the engineering (e.g. corrosion) communities, often making comparison between results difficult.

=== Corrosion Product Toxicity ===
Even though all elements in a bioresorbable metal may themselves be considered biocompatible, the morphology and elemental makeup (or combination of elements) of the degradation products may cause adverse reactions in the body. In addition, the rapid evolution of hydrogen gas that is concomitant with Mg-alloy degradation may cause addition problems in vivo. It is therefore crucial to intricately understand the corrosion of each implant and the products that are release, in light of their toxicity and the likelihood of inflammation. The majority of studies in the literature have focused on elements that are known to be biocompatible or abundant in the body, such as calcium and zinc.

== Potential bioresorbable metal candidates ==
Although all metals will degrade and eventually disappear inside the body through the processes of corrosion and wear, true bioresorbable metals must have an appreciable degradation rate to allow the implant to be absorbed in a practical amount of time in reference to their application. Also, any degradation product would have to be safely metabolized or excreted by the body to avoid toxicity and inflammation.

=== Magnesium ===
Perhaps the most widely investigated material in this category, magnesium was originally investigated as a potential biomaterial in 1878 when it was used by physician Edward C. Huse in wire form as a ligature to stop bleeding. Development continued into the 1920s, after which Mg-based biomaterials fell out of general investigation due to their poor performance (likely due to impurities in the alloys drastically increasing corrosion). It was not until the late 1990s that interest started to pick up again. Mg has a density close to that of bone and is absorbed by the body. Mg is of interest for orthopedic applications due to its relatively low cost, high specific strength, and near-bone elastic modulus, which avoids stress shielding and allows uniform distribution of tissue stress.

Currently, most research on Mg is focused on reducing and controlling the rate of degradation, with many alloys corroding too rapidly (in vitro) for any practical application.

One major concern for magnesium based implants is the high corrosion rate of Mg implants and the rapid production of H_{2} gas. The accumulation of this H_{2} gas can create gas pockets or cavity. Larger gas pockets may separate or swell tissue layers, inhibiting proper osseointegration.

=== Iron ===
The majority of iron-based alloy research has been focused on cardiovascular applications, such as stents. However this area receives much less interest in the research community than Mg-based alloys.

=== Zinc ===
To date comparatively little work has been published on the use of a primarily zinc-based biomaterial. Zn has a corrosion rate that lies between that of Mg and Fe, making it more compatible to the human body. Furthermore, it does not evolve H_{2} gas like Mg or produce toxic corrosion products like Fe, which makes it a very promising candidate for orthopedic implant applications.

However, pure Zn has poor mechanical behavior, with a tensile strength of around 100–150 MPa and an elongation of 0.3–2%, which is far from reaching the strength required as an orthopedic implant material (tensile strength is more than 300 MPa, elongation more than 15%). Alloy and composite fabrication have proven to be excellent ways to improve the mechanical performance of Zn.

While pure Zn might not be compatible in terms of mechanical performance, intensive research is being carried out on various Zn based alloys, with Mg, Cu, Al and Mn as the secondary alloying elements.

=== Biodegradable bulk metallic glasses ===
Although strictly speaking a side-category, a related, relatively new area of interest has been the investigation of bioabsorbable metallic glass, with a group at UNSW currently investigating these novel materials.
