= NC =

NC may refer to:

== People ==
- Naga Chaitanya, an Indian Telugu film actor; sometimes nicknamed by the initials of his first and middle name, NC
- Nathan Connolly, lead guitarist for Snow Patrol
- Nostalgia Critic, the alter ego of Internet comedian Doug Walker from That Guy with the Glasses

== Arts and media ==
- NC-17, an MPAA film rating system code indicating that children under 17 are not admitted
- Nehru Centre, Mumbai, India, a cultural centre
- Newtownards Chronicle, Northern Irish newspaper
- New Conglomerate (NC), a faction in the PlanetSide series
- N.C., "no chord" in guitar tablature
- The NonCommercial condition of Creative Commons licenses
- NCsoft, a producer of MMORPGs such as Lineage
- PernMUSH, an online game based on Anne McCaffrey's Pern novels

== Places ==
- New Caledonia, special collectivity of France (ISO 3166-1 country code NC)
- New Canaan, a town in Connecticut, U.S.
- North Carolina, a U.S. state by postal abbreviation
- Northern Cyprus, a self-declared state on the island of Cyprus

== Science, technology, and mathematics ==
=== Biology and medicine ===
- Nasal cannula, a device used to deliver supplemental oxygen
- Nasal chondrocytes, the cell type within the hyaline cartilage of the nasal septum
- Neural crest, a transient component of the ectoderm
- Effective number of codons, a measure to study the state of codon usage biases in genes

=== Mathematics, computing, electronics, and manufacturing ===
- nc (elliptic function), one of Jacobi's elliptic functions
- NC (complexity), the set of decision problems decidable in polylogarithmic time on a parallel computer with a polynomial number of processors
- Norton Commander, an orthodox file manager program
- Naming Context, in Microsoft Active Directory
- Netcat, a computer network utility
- Network Computer, a diskless desktop computer in the late 1990s
- Not connected, an open cable connection or unassigned connector or part pin
- Normally closed, an electrical switch where the default position is closed
- National Radio Company, American manufacturer of radio equipment from 1914 to 1991
- Numerical control, a method of automatic operation of machine tools
- National coarse, a Unified Thread Standard for screws, nuts, and bolts

=== Physics and chemistry ===
- Neutral current, a class of physics interaction where the mediating boson is neutral, especially for neutrino experiments
- Nanocoulomb, 1:1,000,000,000 of the SI unit of electric charge
- Nuclear chemistry, the subfield of chemistry dealing with radioactivity, nuclear processes and nuclear properties
- Nanocarbon, a short name for material based on carbon nanotubes
- (-NC) Isocyanide, an organic functional group

=== Other uses in science and technology ===
- Noise criteria, a single-value measurement of background noise derived from a graphic representation of the sound pressure audio spectrum (noise curves)

== Transport ==
- NC MX-5 Miata, the third generation of the Mazda MX-5
- Northern Air Cargo, an American cargo airline (IATA designator NC)
- National Jet Systems, an Australian charter airline (IATA designator NC)
- Curtiss NC, an American flying boat nicknamed the "Nancy boat"
- NC-4, the first aircraft to cross the atlantic (with multiple stops)
- NC, an international maritime distress signal

== Political organizations ==
- National Coalition for Syrian Revolutionary and Opposition Forces or National Coalition, a Syrian revolutionary organisation
- New Centre, a former political party in France now known as The Centrists
- Nepali Congress, a political party in Nepal
  - Nepali Congress (Democratic)
  - Nepali Congress (Rastrabadi)

== Education ==
- National Certificate, an educational award in various countries including Ireland and Scotland
- New Continent School (Colegio Nuevo Continente), a private school in Mexico

== Other uses ==
- Naming convention, a convention for naming things.
- No comment, in internet slang
- No contest (combat sports)
- Non Cognizable Offense, in law
- Nonconformity (quality), in Quality management
- Noun class, a grammatical category of nouns

== See also ==
- NCS (disambiguation)
