= NCS =

NCS may refer to:

== Organizations ==
- NASCAR Cup Series, American flagship stock car racing series
- NASCAR Canada Series, canadian stock car racing series
- National Care Service, proposed social care service in the United Kingdom
- National Career Service (India)
- National Cartoonists Society, US
- National Center for Simulation, US defense technologies association
- National Children's Study, US cohort study
- National Citizen Service, voluntary service for 16-17-year-olds in England
- National Clandestine Service, later Directorate of Operations, a component of the CIA
- National Crime Squad, a former British police organisation
- National Communications System, a former US agency
- National Convenience Stores, a US company
- Naval Canteen Service, the Royal Navy branch of the NAAFI
- NCS Group, formerly National Computer Systems, Singapore
- North Carolina Symphony, based in Raleigh, North Carolina
- North Coast Section, an athletic organization in California, US
- Northern Cities Shift, a series of sound changes in Inland Northern American English
- NoCopyrightSounds, a British record label
- Neurocritical Care Society, an international, multidisciplinary medical society

=== Schools and universities ===
- National Cathedral School, Washington, D.C.
- National Cryptologic School, of the U.S. National Security Agency
- Navy Children School, India
- Newark Charter School, Newark, Delaware, US
- Newham Collegiate Sixth Form Centre, London, England
- Northland Christian School, Houston, Texas, US
- North Cestrian School, Altrincham, Greater Manchester, England

== Science and technology ==
=== Biology and chemistry ===
- N-Chlorosuccinimide, an organic chemical
- Neotenic complex syndrome
- Nerve conduction study, a medical diagnostic test
- Neuronal calcium sensor, a family of proteins
- Thiocyanate, a compound in the cyanate family
  - Isothiocyanate, the functional group RNCS
- Natural Color System, a proprietary color model

=== Computing ===
- National CAD Standard, US
- Network Computing System, an implementation of the Network Computing Architecture at Apollo Computer
- Network-based Call Signaling, a protocol used with VoIP
- Networked control system, closing control loops with a communication network

== Transport ==
- Newark City Subway, New Jersey, US
- North Central Service, a rail line in Chicago, Illinois, US

== Other uses ==
- National Compensation Survey, US
- NATO Codification System, for items of supply
- Norwegian continental shelf, the continental shelf of Norway
- NCS: Manhunt, a British crime drama series from 2001-2002
- NoCopyrightSounds, a British royalty-free music record label

== See also ==
- NC (disambiguation)
