= Power Integrations, Inc. =

Silicon Valley semiconductor company

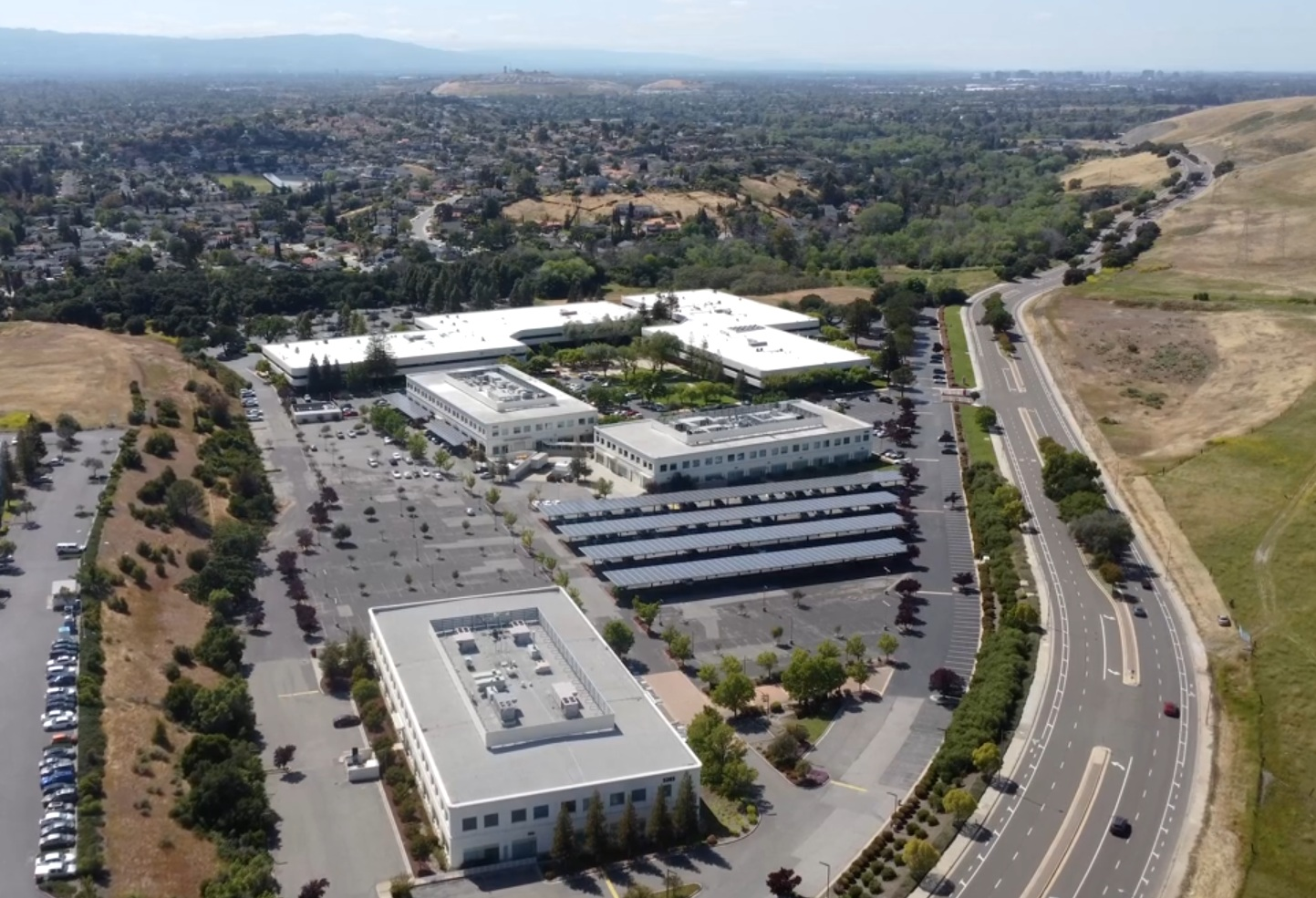
- Company type: Public
- Traded as: Nasdaq: POWI; S&P 600 component
- Industry: Semiconductors
- Founded: 1988
- Founder: Klas Eklund, Art Fury and Steve Sharp
- Headquarters: San Jose, California, United States
- Key people: Jennifer Lloyd (CEO); Balu Balakrishnan (former CEO)
- Products: High-voltage integrated circuits for power conversion
- Website: www.power.com

Power Integrations, Inc. is a publicly traded semiconductor company (NASDAQ: POWI) headquartered in San Jose, California. Founded in 1988, the company specializes in high-voltage integrated circuits used in power conversion for applications ranging from consumer electronics and renewable energy to industrial equipment and automotive power systems.

== History ==
In the late 1990s, Power Integrations introduced EcoSmart and TinySwitch chips, which reduce standby power consumption in electronic devices. These technologies help manufacturers cut energy leakage by up to 95%, contributing to an estimated 11.5 TWh of annual electricity savings. The company estimates its components have been used in over 20 billion devices and saved approximately $10 billion in electricity costs.

The company has also advocated for regulatory standards for efficient power supplies. In 2001, then-CEO Balu Balakrishnan demonstrated its technology to President George W. Bush, influencing adoption of the one-watt standby standard for Energy Star certification and prompting an executive order on energy-efficient federal purchases.

In 2006, the chairman and CFO resigned amid an internal investigation into stock option accounting, which led to potential earnings restatements and Nasdaq scrutiny.

In 2011, Power Integrations acquired Qspeed Semiconductor, a supplier of high-voltage diodes, for approximately US$7 million in cash. In May 2012, it acquired CT‑Concept Technologie AG (CONCEPT), a Swiss developer of integrated IGBT drivers, in a cash deal valued at about US$115 million. On 1 January 2015, it acquired Cambridge Semiconductor Limited (CamSemi), a UK‑based fabless power‑management IC vendor, for roughly US$23 million.

CEO Balu Balakrishnan retired in 2025 after more than 20 years. He was succeeded by Jennifer Lloyd, a former Analog Devices executive.

== Gallium Nitride (GaN) technology ==
Power Integrations is active in gallium nitride (GaN) semiconductor development and holds several patents in the GaN-on-sapphire domain. It has contributed to GaN's monolithic integration in power electronics.

According to research firm Omdia, Power Integrations was the top supplier of GaN power semiconductors in 2022, with nearly 17% market share. In 2024, the company introduced a 1700 V GaN transistor integrated into its InnoMux converter ICs for industrial use.

In 2025, Power Integrations incorporated high-voltage GaN technology into its collaboration with NVIDIA on the development of an 800 VDC ecosystem for AI data centers.

== Financial performance ==
In 2001, the Wall Street Journal reported on Power Integrations’ efforts to reduce the influence of short‑term “momentum investors,” who had driven significant volatility in its share price following its 1997 IPO. During the technology‑sector boom, the company’s rapid growth attracted investors focused on quarter‑to‑quarter earnings acceleration, contributing to a sharp rise in the stock price and an equally steep decline when results failed to meet expectations during 2000.

Power Integrations faced a downturn in 2018 and 2019, with quarterly earnings falling by up to 39% due to factors such as slowing demand and trade-related headwinds, before growth in fast-charging technology and appliance markets drove a recovery in late 2019. That year, the company secured supply contracts with major cell phone manufacturers.

In 2022, Power Integrations faced challenges from weak Chinese smartphone demand but continued investing in automotive and GaN technologies.

== See also ==
- Semiconductor industry
- Renewable energy commercialization
