= Copper loss =

Energy loss due to wiring resistance

Copper loss is the term often given to heat produced by electrical currents in the conductors of transformer windings, or other electrical devices. Copper losses are an undesirable transfer of energy, as are core losses, which result from induced currents in adjacent components. The term is applied regardless of whether the windings are made of copper or another conductor, such as aluminium. Hence the term winding loss is often preferred. The term load loss is used in electricity delivery to describe the portion of the electricity lost between the generator and the consumer that is related to the load power (is proportional to the square thereof), as opposed to the no-load loss.

== Calculations ==
Copper losses result from Joule heating and so are also referred to as "I squared R losses", in reference to Joule's First Law. This states that the energy lost each second, or power, increases as the square of the current through the windings and in proportion to the electrical resistance of the conductors.

$$\mbox{Copper Loss} \propto I^2 \cdot R$$

where I is the current flowing in the conductor and R is the resistance of the conductor. With I in amperes and R in ohms, the calculated power loss is given in watts.

Joule heating has a coefficient of performance of 1.0, meaning that every 1 watt of electrical power is converted to 1 Joule of heat. Therefore, the energy lost due to copper loss is:

$$\mbox{Copper Loss} = I^2 \cdot R \cdot t$$

where t is the time in seconds the current is maintained.

== Effect of frequency ==
For low-frequency applications, the power loss can be minimized by employing conductors with a large cross-sectional area, made from low-resistivity metals.

With high-frequency currents, the proximity effect and skin effect cause the current to be unevenly distributed across the conductor, increasing its effective resistance, and making loss calculations more difficult.

Litz wire is a type of wire constructed to force the current to be distributed uniformly, thereby reducing Joule heating.

== Reducing copper loss ==
Among other measures, the electrical energy efficiency of a typical industrial induction motor can be improved by reducing the electrical losses in the stator windings (e.g., by increasing the cross-sectional area of the conductor, improving the winding technique, and using materials with higher electrical conductivity, such as copper). In power transmission, voltage is stepped up to reduce current thereby reducing power loss.

== Sources ==
- Wu, Anguan; Ni, Baoshan (7 June 2016). Line Loss Analysis and Calculation of Electric Power Systems. John Wiley & Sons. ISBN 978-1-118-86709-9. OCLC 1062309002.
