= Bioresorbable stent =

Medical stent that dissolves or is absorbed by the body

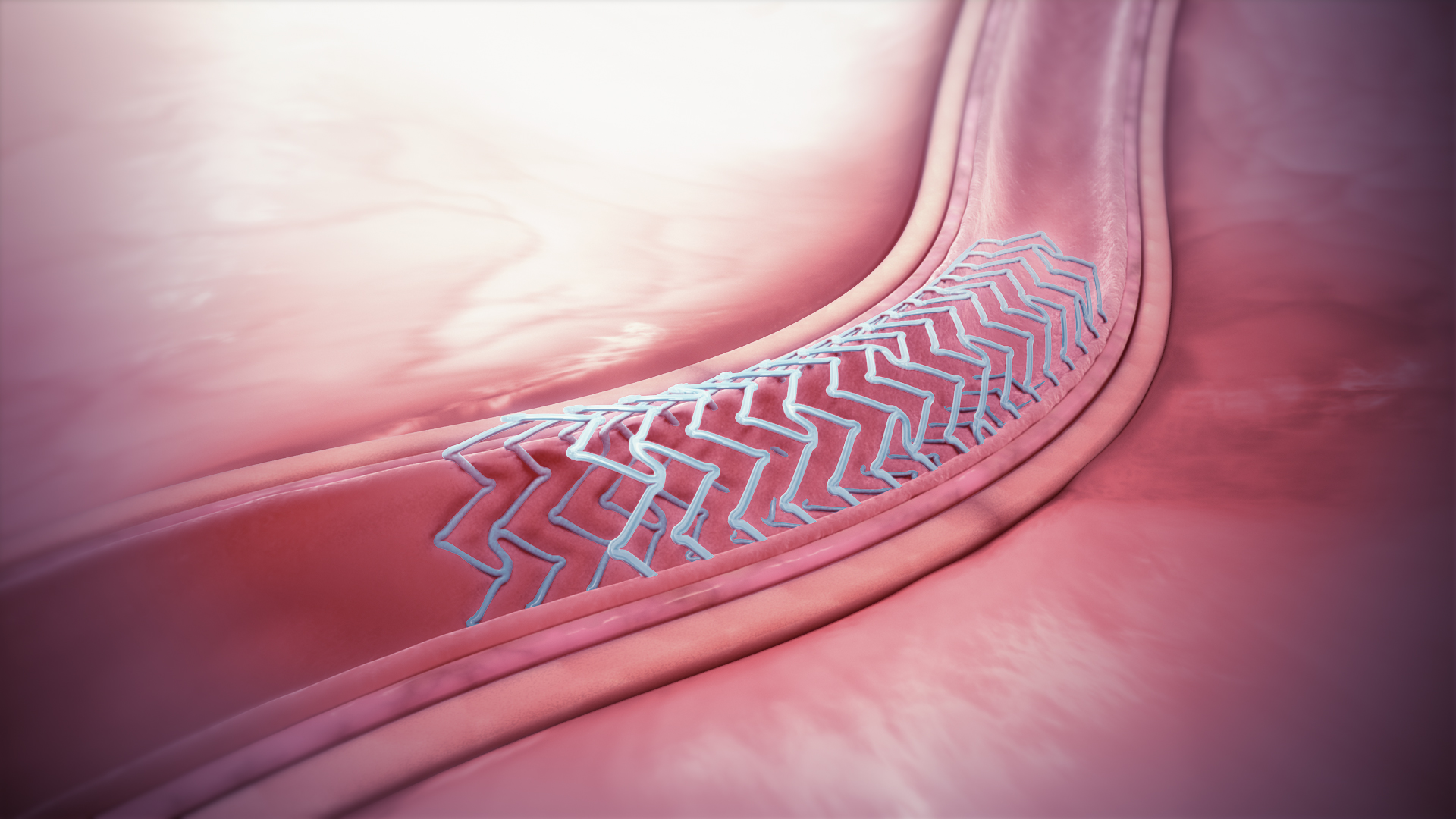
- A bioresorbable stent implanted in the blood vessel.
- Other names: Bioresorbable scaffold, biodegradable stent or naturally-dissolving stent
- Specialty: Vascular system

A bioresorbable stent is a tube-like device (stent) that is used to open and widen clogged heart arteries and then dissolves or is absorbed by the body. It is made from a material that can release a drug to prevent scar tissue growth. It can also restore normal vessel function and avoid long-term complications of metal stents.

In medicine, a stent is any device which is inserted into a blood vessel or other anatomical internal duct to expand it to prevent or alleviate a blockage. Traditionally, such devices are fabricated from metal mesh and remain in the body permanently or until removed through further surgical intervention. A bioresorbable stent (also called bioresorbable scaffold, biodegradable stent or naturally-dissolving stent) serves the same purpose, but is manufactured from a material that may dissolve or be absorbed in the body.

== Background ==
The use of metal drug-eluting stents presents some potential drawbacks. These include a predisposition to late stent thrombosis, prevention of late vessel adaptive or expansive remodeling, hindrance of surgical revascularization, and impairment of imaging with multislice CT.

To overcome some of these potential drawbacks, several companies are pursuing the development of bioresorbable scaffolds or bioabsorbable stents. Like metal stents, placement of a bioresorbable stent will restore blood flow and support the vessel through the healing process. However, in the case of a bioresorbable stent, the stent will gradually resorb and be benignly cleared from the body, enabling a natural reconstruction of the arterial wall and restoration of vascular function.

Studies have shown that the most critical period of vessel healing is largely complete by approximately three to nine months. Therefore, the goal of a bioresorbable or "temporary" stent is to fully support the vessel during this critical period, and then resorb from the body when it is no longer needed.

== Base materials ==
Bioabsorbable scaffolds, or naturally dissolving stents, that have been investigated include base materials that are either metals or polymers. While polymer-based scaffolds had a strong presence at first, they have meanwhile lost some appeal due to safety concerns and focus is now moved towards metallic magnesium-based scaffolds.

=== Metal based ===
Metal stent candidates are magnesium, iron, zinc and their alloys.

Magnesium-based scaffolds have been approved for use in several countries around the world. The only commercially available magnesium-based scaffold consists of a magnesium alloy, approximately 95% of which resorbs within one year of implantation. Thousands of commercially available magnesium-based scaffolds have been implanted. Clinical results suggest that magnesium-based scaffolds may be a viable option in avoiding the drawbacks of permanent stents. While degrading harmlessly, it has been shown to possess a functional degradation time of about 30 days in vivo. This is much short of the three-to-six month window desired for bioabsorbable stents. Thus, much attention has been given to drastically reducing the rate of magnesium corrosion by alloying, coating, etc. Many novel methods have surfaced to minimize the penetration rate and hydrogen evolution rate (or, in layman's terms, the corrosion rate). One of the most successful has involved the creation of bioabsorbable metallic glasses via rapid solidification. Other, alternative solutions have included the development of magnesium–rare-earth (Mg-RE) alloys, which benefit from the low cytotoxicity of RE elements. Coatings and sophisticated materials processing routes are currently being developed to further decrease the corrosion rate. Phase-field simulations have shown that localized pitting corrosion, rather than uniform degradation, can severely compromise the structural integrity of magnesium scaffolds under mechanical loading. However, a number of issues remain limiting the further development of Mg biomaterials in general.

Iron stents were shown using an in vivo evaluation method based on the murine abdominal aorta to generate an iron oxide-filled cavity in the vascular wall that is unlikely to be metabolized safely.

Zinc shows desirable physiological corrosion behavior, meeting a benchmark penetration rate of 20 micrometers per year. However, Zn has poor mechanical behavior, with a tensile strength of around 100–150 MPa and an elongation of 0.3–2%, which is far from reaching the strength required as an orthopedic implant or stent material.

=== Polymer-based ===
Polymer-based stents have been approved for use in some countries around the world. These are based on poly(L-lactide) (PLLA), chosen because it is able to maintain a radially strong scaffold that breaks down over time into lactic acid, a naturally occurring molecule that the body can use for metabolism. Other polymers in development include tyrosine poly carbonate and salicylic acid.

An example of a naturally dissolving stent is the 'Absorb' stent 'produced by Abbott that has several design components and features: base scaffold: a poly(L-lactide) polymer similar to that in dissolvable stitches is shaped into a tube made up of zigzag hoops linked together by bridges; drug-eluting layer': a mixture of poly-D, L-lactide (PDLLA) and everolimus; 'markers': a pair of radio-opaque platinum markers at the ends that allow the device to be visualized during angiography; 'delivery system': a balloon delivery system.

Recently however, Polymer-based scaffolds, in particular Poly-L-Lactide Acid (PLLA) scaffolds, have raised serious concerns on the scaffold performance particularly in terms of safety which led to the commercial discontinuation of the main representative Absorb.

== Clinical research ==
Clinical research has shown that resorbable scaffolds, or naturally dissolving stents, offer comparable efficacy and safety profile to drug-eluting stents. Specifically, the Magmaris resorbable magnesium scaffold has reported a favorable safety profile with low target lesion failure and scaffold thrombosis rates. These clinical results are comparable to thin-strutted drug-eluting stents in similar patient populations.

The Absorb naturally dissolving stent has also been investigated in single-arm trials and in randomized trials comparing it to a drug-eluting stent. Early and late major adverse cardiac events, revascularizations, and scaffold thromboses have been uncommon and similar to the Xience DES, a market leader in the drug eluting stent category. Studies in real-world patients are ongoing.

Imaging studies show that the Absorb naturally dissolving stent begins to dissolve from six to 12 months and is fully dissolved between two and three years after it is placed in the artery. Two small platinum markers remain to mark the location of the original PCI. The artery is able to dilate and contract, called vasomotion, similar to a healthy blood vessel at two years.

== History ==
In the US, the first fully absorbable stent was approved by FDA in 2016.

== See also ==
- drug-eluting stent – Medical implant to treat narrowed arteries
- coronary stent – Medical stent implanted into coronary arteries
