= Richard N.W. Wohns =

American neurosurgeon (born 1953)

- Born: Richard N.W. Wohns
- Education: Harvard College; Yale School of Medicine; National Hospital, Queen Square; UW Dept of Neurological Surgery; UW School of Business; Seattle University School of Law
- Scientific career
- Fields: Neurosurgery
- Workplaces: NeoSpine, LLC; Good Samaritan Hospital; St Francis Hospital; Swedish Medical Center

Richard N.W. Wohns is a neurosurgeon who is the founder of NeoSpine, LLC (a spine surgery and interventional pain management center). He has been listed one of the 50 Spine Surgeons and Specialists to Know by Becker's ASC Review. He currently practices and teaches medicine in the Puget Sound Region of Washington, United States.

== Career ==
Wohns is a board certified neurosurgeon affiliated with St Francis Hospital, He is the founder of NeoSpine which has offices in Gig Harbor and Puyallup, Washington. Wohns is a pioneer of outpatient spine surgery and founded the company, NeoSpine, which developed outpatient spine centers nationally. NeoSpine was acquired by Symbion, Inc., in 2008, then Symbion was acquired by Surgery Partners. Wohns was special consultant to Surgery Partners for outpatient spine surgery. He was also a co-founder of U.S. Radiosurgery which was acquired by Alliance Oncology, Inc., in 2011. Wohns was director on the Board of Aqueduct Critical Care, Inc., and was Chief Medical Officer for angelMD, and is consultant and scientific advisor to a number of spinal device companies, and principal of Wohns Consulting Group.

From 1995 to 2024, Wohns was an associate clinical professor of Neurological Surgery at the University of Washington.

Wohns has been the physician for a number of mountain climbing expeditions including early in his career when he served as medical director for the Ultima Thule Everest Expedition in which high altitude brain research was performed. On a K2 expedition he performed an appendectomy on a Balti porter who perforated his appendix.

During the summer of 2013, Dr. Wohns returned to Nepal to teach minimally invasive spine surgery techniques to the staff at Tribhuvan University Teaching Hospital. During this trip he also performed pro bono surgeries using donated implants and instruments. He returns annually to lecture and lead spine surgery workshops in Kathmandu, where he is now visiting professor of Neurological Surgery. Dr. Wohns has established the Nepal Spine Foundation, a non-profit 501(c)3 organization, to promote neurosurgery education and care for patients in Nepal. Dr. Wohns has also lectured and operated in the Maldives where he has performed several "first" surgeries including cervical disc replacement, lumbar disc replacement, anterior lumbar interbody fusion and sacroiliac joint fusion.

Wohns has performed over 5000 outpatient cervical and lumbar surgeries and his expertise includes outpatient and minimally invasive spine surgery, complex spine surgery including robotically assisted surgeries, cervical and lumbar disc arthroplasty (artificial discs). He lectures both nationally and internationally and hosts yearly summits on the latest advancements in spine surgery techniques.

== Current positions ==
- South Sound Neurosurgery Research & Education Institute, Director
- Past-President, Western Neurosurgical Society,
- Nepal Spine Foundation, Founder and chairman of the Board

== Awards and recognitions ==
In March 2014, Wohns was named in an article published on Becker's Hospital Review entitled 40 of the Smartest People in Healthcare. He was recognized in September 2013 in Becker's Spine Review as one of the 92 Spinal Surgeon Device Inventors and Innovators to Know. He was listed in 50 Spine Surgeons and Specialists to know by Becker's ASC Review in February 2010., He was recognized in 2009 as one of the top three Outstanding Health Care Executives – Metropolitan Region by the Seattle Business Journal.
