= Nasal chondrocytes =

Nasal chondrocytes (NC) are present in the hyaline cartilage of the nasal septum and in fact are the only cell type within the tissue. Similar to chondrocytes present in articular cartilage, NC express extracellular matrix proteins such as glycosaminoglycans and collagen.

== In their natural environment ==
At birth the nasal septum, except for the vomer anlage is completely cartilaginous. In the second half of the first year of life, the septum progressively ossifies in posterior-anterior direction by a process of endochondral ossification. The remaining cartilaginous part (characterized as hyaline cartilage) of the human nasal septum has a specific three-dimensional organization with regards to local differences in cell size and the amounts of extracellular matrix. In the outer region of the cartilage, NC are numerous, small, flat and oriented parallel to the surface. In the intermediate and central regions, NC are spheroid in shape, less dense, and are aligned perpendicular to the cartilage surface. The cartilage matrix is mainly composed of type II collagen (90-95%), although small amounts of type IX and XI collagen are also found. Nasal cartilage is tightly connected to perichondrium, consisting of several layers of connective tissue fibers (mainly based on type I collagen) running parallel to the cartilage.

== Tissue engineering applications ==
Articular chondrocytes have typically been the cell type used for cartilage tissue engineering strategies for articular cartilage repair. Since NC can also express hyaline cartilage-specific extracellular matrix proteins such as glycosaminoglycans and collagen, NC have recently also been used for the in vitro engineering of cartilage tissues due to its specific cellular regulation.

=== Cell isolation ===
Harvesting of nasal cartilage is minimally invasive, can be performed in an outpatient procedure under local anesthesia and is associated with minimal morbidity. NC can be isolated from nasal septal cartilage biopsies by enzymatic digestion using collagenase type I, II or IV (at different combination and concentration – varying from 0.15% to 0.6% –) alone or after an initial short pre-incubation phase with pronase (0.2% - 1%). Cell yield after enzymatic digestion of the nasal cartilage was estimated to be 2,100 - 3,700 cells/mg of tissue. Alternatively, NC can be isolated by outgrowth culture of nasal cartilage fragments.

=== Cell expansion ===
After isolation from septal cartilage biopsies, NC can be extensively expanded in numbers by conventional in vitro cell culture methods (monolayer culture in flasks or Petri dishes). The proliferation rate of NC was reported to be increased in the presence of specific growth factors such as TGF-beta and FGF-2 or culture supplements like Insulin-Transferrin-Selenium. NC cultured in medium containing autologous serum exhibit similar proliferation rates to NC cultured with medium supplemented with fetal bovine serum. Although articular chondrocytes derived from older individuals have been shown to have a lower proliferation capacity than from younger donors, NC have been shown to have significantly less age-dependence.

=== Differentiation ===
Similar to other chondrocytes from hyaline cartilage tissues in other locations in the human body, NC undergo a process of cell de-differentiation during monolayer culture. NC de-differentiation can be characterized by a gradual acquisition of a fibroblastic morphology, the expression of proteins associated with an undifferentiated mesenchymal cell phenotype (e.g., type I collagen and versican), and decreased expression of hyaline cartilage proteins (e.g., type II collagen and aggrecan). However, NC can re-differentiate when transferred back into a more physiological three-dimensional environment. Abundant production of cartilage specific matrix has been reported by expanded NC when induced to re-differentiate in micromass pellets, alginate beads, hydrogels, or into porous scaffolds based on polyglycolic acid, polyethylene glycol terephthalate/polybuthylene terephalate, collagen, or hyaluronic acid. Supplementation with specific growth factors (e.g., TGF-beta, IGF-1, and GDF-5) during re-differentiation has been shown to enhance the accumulation of glycosaminoglycans (GAG) and type II collagen as well as the biomechanical properties of the generated constructs.

Autologous serum has also been used during NC re-differentiation in place of fetal bovine serum with similar efficacy. Studies that directly compared the re-differentiation of articular chondrocytes to NC have shown that the cartilage forming capacity of NC was higher and more reproducible than that of articular chondrocytes with lower donor-related dependency. Additionally NC have been recently shown to exhibit features of self-renewal capability, being able to form cartilage tissue following serial cloning possibly due to their neuro-ectodermal origin.

=== Animal studies ===
Pre-clinical investigations have been undertaken using various animal models to provide proof-of-principle of the clinical potential of NC-based tissue engineered constructs for cartilage reconstruction. The maturation of human NC engineered grafts has often been assessed in the subcutaneous pocket of nude mice, i.e., an environment highly vascularized and permissive to, but not inductive of, chondrogenesis. The extent of cartilage matrix production and the mechanical properties of NC-based constructs have been reported to increase in such ectopic in vivo models. An ectopic mouse model was also used in order to test the effects of different production methods for generating large clinically relevant-sized NC-based tissue grafts.

Although these models can yield insightful results, nude mice are not capable of eliciting a significant immune response, and therefore these studies cannot predict the prognosis of implanted engineered septal cartilage in an immunocompetent host. As an alternative, an orthotopic rat model has been established to study nasal septum repair. In this model, septal cartilage was first perforated to create a defect, and subsequently, an engineered cartilage graft implanted into the defect during the same surgical procedure. In addition, NCs are being actively investigated to improve the outcomes of reconstructive surgery on trachea hyaline cartilage and ear elastic cartilage in rabbits.

Using an orthotopic large animal model to study repair of articular cartilage defects, engineered NC-based cartilage grafts were implanted into the condyle of goats. In this study, it was determined that NC directly contributed to the repair of the articular cartilage defects and resulted in a superior outcome as compared to engineered articular chondrocyte-based grafts.

=== Clinical applications ===
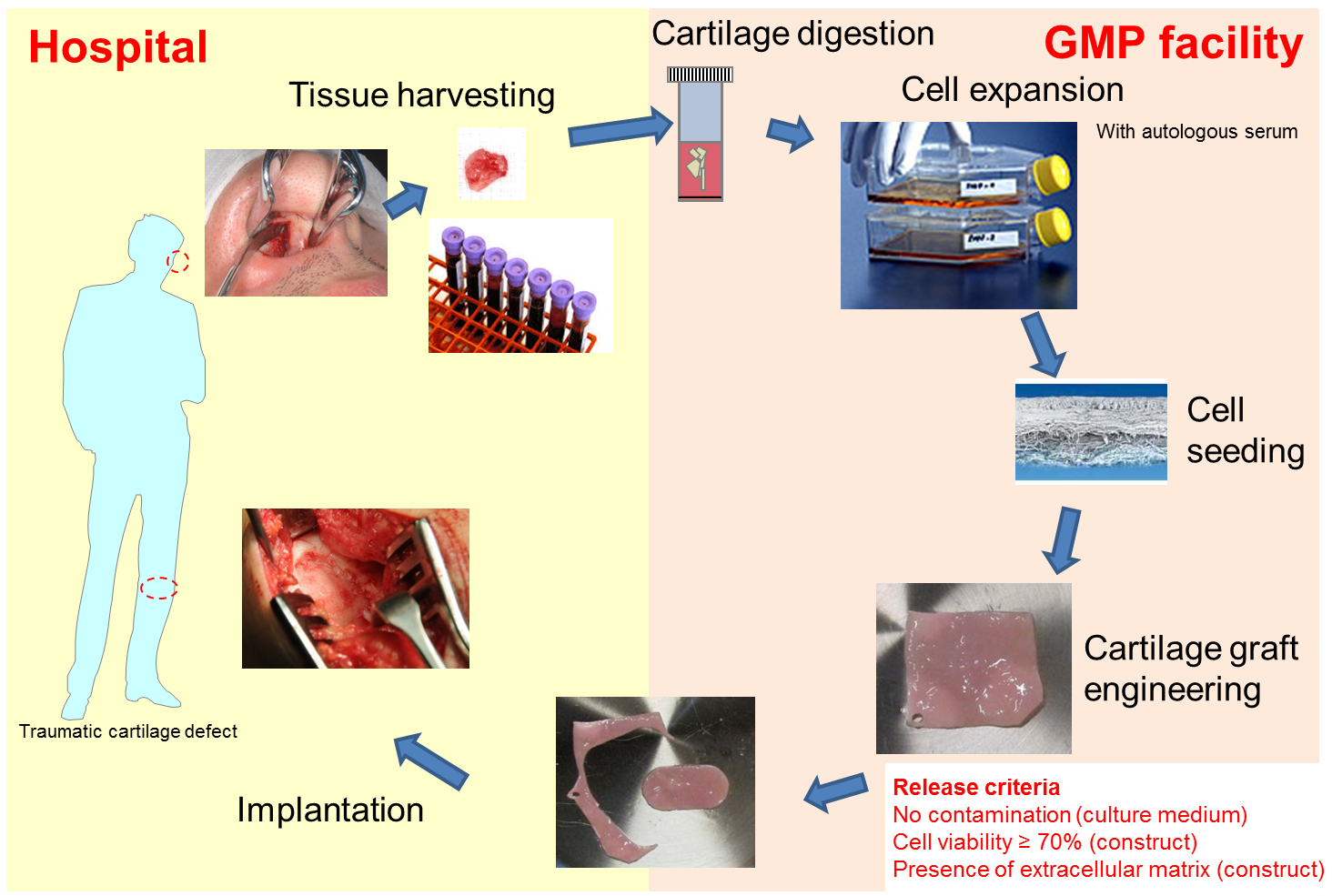
Clinical application of autologous NC-based cartilage tissues

Engineered cartilage tissue, based on autologous NC, has recently been used by plastic surgeons for the reconstruction of nasal cartilage defects. Tissue engineered cartilage grafts based on NC as autologous grafts for the reconstruction of the alar lobule of the nose after skin tumor resection in a first-in-man clinical trial (ClinicalTrials.gov, number NCT01242618) (see figure on the right). Their results demonstrated that the engineered grafts could lead to complete structural, functional and aesthetic satisfaction. Moreover, since harvesting of the nasal cartilage biopsy was minimally invasive, it could be performed in an outpatient procedure under local anesthesia, and was therefore associated with minimal morbidity.

Several studies have demonstrated that NC are compatible with the environmental features typical of the injured knee (e.g., in terms of response to inflammatory molecules, mechanical loading and genetic molecular signature). Thus nasal chondrocytes have been proposed as an alternative cell source for the repair of articular cartilage defects. A phase I clinical trial (ClinicalTrials.gov, number NCT 01605201) was conducted to test the safety and feasibility of implanting a tissue engineered cartilage graft based on autologous nasal chondrocytes for the regeneration of knee cartilage defects. The clinical observations of the first 10 patients of this study indicated not only safety and feasibility of the procedure, but together with Magnetic Resonance Imaging (MRI) and delayed gadolinium-enhanced magnetic resonance imaging of cartilage (dGEMRIC) data, also showed promising results for efficacy of the treatment as indicated by significant improvement in clinical scores and regeneration of hyaline repair tissue after 24 months. Based on this study, a multi-center phase II clinical trial was initiated and is currently ongoing to assess the efficacy of the NC-based cartilage grafts for the repair of traumatic knee cartilage defects (BIO-CHIP; funded by the European Union through the Horizon 2020 program, grant number 681103).
