= No load power =

No load power consumption is the electric power consumed by a battery charger when it is plugged into a wall socket but without the mobile phone or other battery device being connected. Contrary to standby power, which is a low power mode of devices such as TVs to maintain system functions such as responding to remote control, true no-load energy does nothing of use.

== Estimates of no-load power consumption ==
The no-load power contribution to a country’s household energy demands is thought to be considerable. The average number of handsets per capita is frequently more than one in many countries, the proportion of chargers left accidentally or deliberately plugged in is thought to be significant and with current designs over 60% of a mobile phone’s energy use is wasted as no-load.

As a result, mobile phone manufacturers have become increasingly focused on reducing the no-load consumption of their power chargers. For example, in 2002, a typical design might use about 3 watts on average and in 2007 less than 0.5 watts.

For the purposes of estimating consumption, no-load and standby power are often lumped together, and it is difficult to distinguish them in statistics. Estimates of the magnitude are discussed with numerical detail in the article on standby power. Before energy-wastage initiatives were implemented, it was estimated that power used by devices plugged in but not in active use was about 10% of domestic electric energy power consumption, the small magnitude of the power drawn being offset by 24-hour drain.

== Policies to reduce no load power ==
Energy Star, the EU code of conduct on standby and other mandatory and regulatory standards are encouraging manufacturers to make further reductions in no-load energy demands.

For example: under the Energy Star V2.0 (level V) voluntary standard introduced in November 2008, the no-load consumption of a typical 4.25 W charger has to be less than 0.3 W. The EU code of conduct version 4, introduced in January 2009, has a limit of 0.25 W for mobile handheld battery-driven applications, reducing to 0.15 W in January 2011.

== Rating system ==
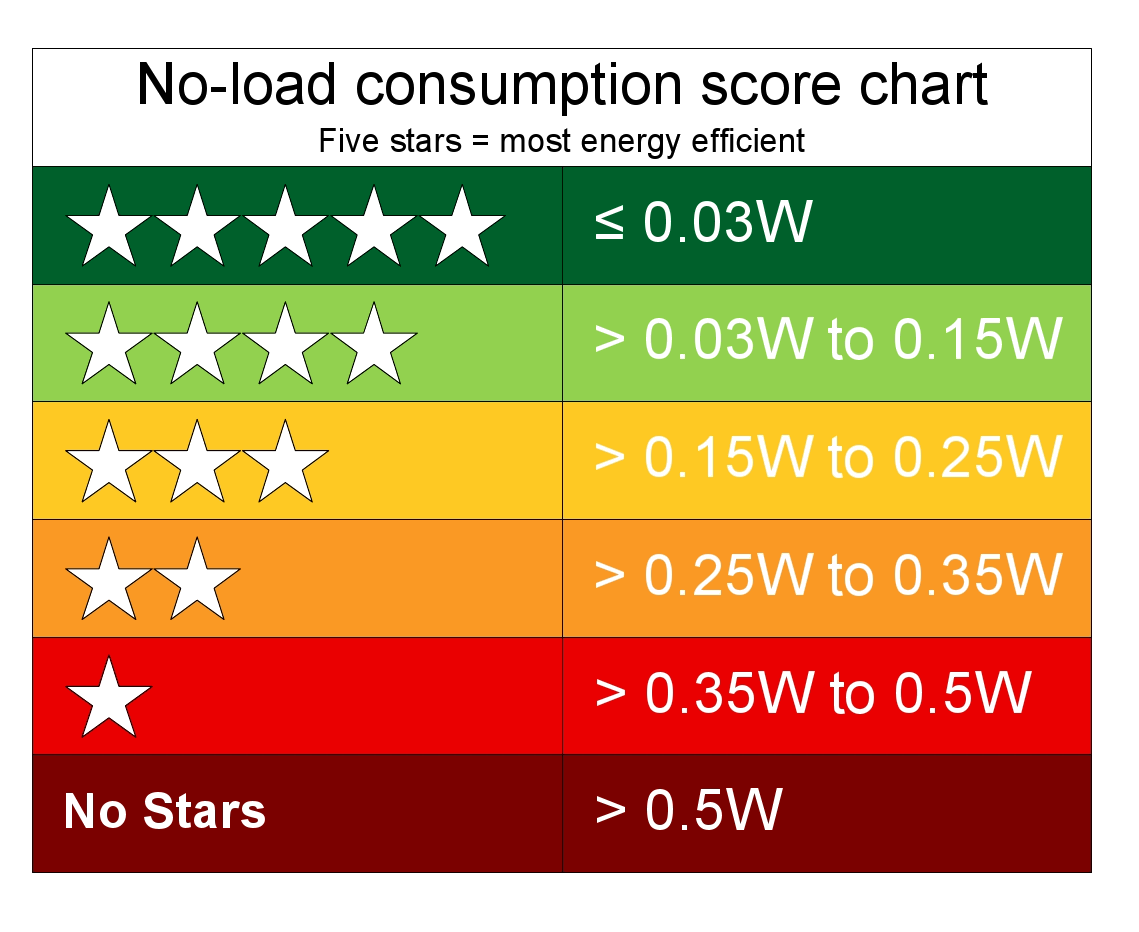
The world's five largest handset makers introduced a new rating system in November 2008 to help consumers more easily identify the most energy-efficient chargers

In November 2008, the world’s five largest mobile phone makers—Nokia, Samsung, LG Electronics, Motorola and Sony Ericsson—announced their own five star energy rating system to help consumers more easily identify the most energy-efficient chargers. Chargers are being labeled with no stars for no-load consumptions exceeding 0.5 W, up to five stars for consumption of not more than 0.03 W.
