= Splat quenching =

Technique of injecting molten metals between water-cooled copper rollers

Splat quenching is a metallurgical, metal morphing technique used for forming metals with a particular crystal structure by means of extremely rapid quenching, or cooling.

A typical technique for splat quenching involves casting molten metal by pouring it between two massive, cooled copper rollers that are constantly chilled by the circulation of water. These provide a near-instant quench because of the large surface area in close contact with the melt. The thin sheet formed has a low ratio of volume relative to the area used for cooling.

Products that are formed through this process have a crystal structure that is near-amorphous, or non-crystalline. They are commonly used for their valuable magnetic properties, specifically high magnetic permeability. This makes them useful for magnetic shielding and for low-loss transformer cores in electrical grids.

== Procedure ==
The process of splat quenching involves rapid quenching or cooling of molten metal. A typical procedure for splat quenching involves pouring the molten metal between two cooled copper rollers that are circulated with water to transfer the heat away from the metal, causing it to almost instantaneously solidify.

A more efficient splat quenching technique is Duwez's and Willen's gun technique. Their technique produces higher rates of cooling of the droplet of metal because the sample is propelled at high velocities and hits a quencher plate causing its surface area to increase which immediately solidifies the metal. This allows for a wider range of metals that can be quenched and be given amorphous-like features instead of the general iron alloy.

Another technique involves the consecutive spraying of the molten metal onto a chemical vapor deposition surface. However, the layers do not fuse together as desired and this causes oxides to be contained in the structure and pores to form around the structure. Manufacturing companies take an interest in the resultant products because of their near-net shaping capabilities.

== Varying factors ==
Some varying factors in splat quenching are the drop size and velocity of the metal in ensuring the complete solidification of the metal. In cases where the volume of the drop is too large or the velocity is too slow, the metal will not solidify past equilibrium causing it to remelt. Therefore, experiments are carried out to determine the precise volume and velocity of the droplet that will ensure complete solidification of a certain metal. Intrinsic and extrinsic factors influencing the glass-forming ability of metallic alloys were analyzed and classified.

== Product ==
=== Structure ===
The near-instantaneous quenching of the metal causes the metal to have a near-amorphous crystalline structure, which is very uncharacteristic of a typical crystal. This structure is very similar to liquids, and the only difference between liquids and amorphous solids is the high viscosity of the solid. Solids in general have a crystalline structure instead of an amorphous structure because the crystalline structure has a stronger binding energy. The way a solid can have the irregular spacing between its atoms is when a liquid is cooled below its melting temperature. The reason for this is the molecules do not have enough time to rearrange themselves in a crystalline structure, and therefore stay in the liquid-like structure.

=== Magnetic property ===
Amorphous solids in general have a unique magnetic property because of their atomic disorder as explained above. They are rather soft metals and each has its own specific magnetic property depending on the means of production. In the splat quenching process, the metals are very soft and have superparamagnetic properties or shifting polarity behavior caused by the rapid and intense heat transfer.

== See also ==
- Melt spinning
