= Frank J. Sprague =

American inventor and pioneer in electrical engineering (1857–1934)

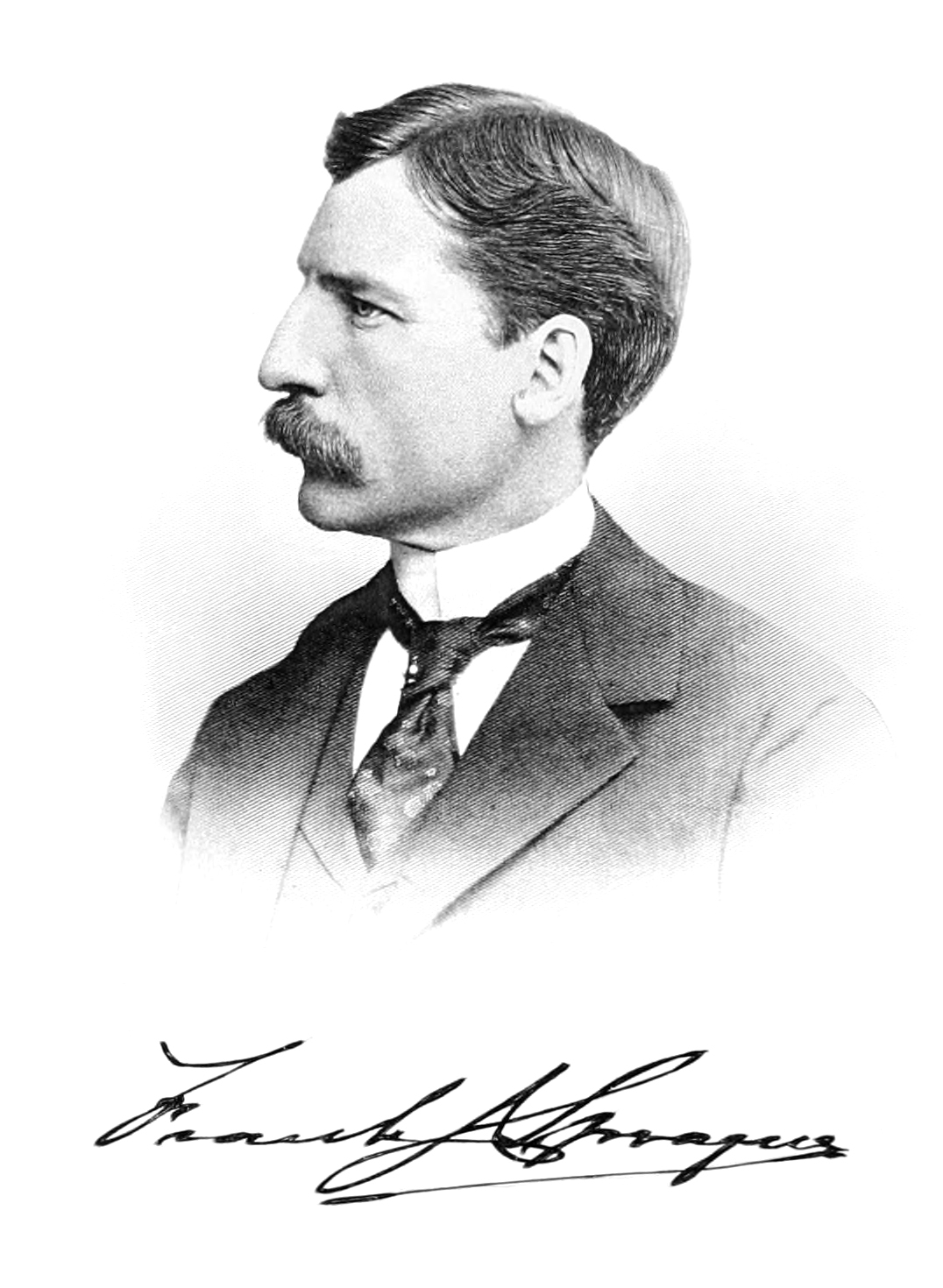
- Frank J. Sprague, "father of electric traction"
- Born: July 25, 1857; Milford, Connecticut, US
- Died: October 25, 1934 (aged 77)
- Education: United States Naval Academy
- Known for: Electrical Engineering
- Awards: Elliott Cresson Medal (1903); IEEE Edison Medal (1910); Franklin Medal (1921); John Fritz Medal (Posthumous, 1935)
- Scientific career
- Fields: Electrical engineering

Frank Julian Sprague (July 25, 1857 – October 25, 1934) was an American inventor who contributed to the development of the electric motor, electric railways, and electric elevators. His contributions were especially important in promoting urban development by increasing the size cities could reasonably attain (through better transportation) and by allowing greater concentration of business in commercial sections (through the use of electric elevators in skyscrapers). He became known as the "father of electric traction". Demonstrating an aptitude for science and mathematics, Sprague secured an appointment to the U.S. Naval Academy in 1874 and, after graduation in 1878 and two years at sea, resigned to pursue his career in electrical engineering.

== Early life and education ==
Sprague was born in Milford, Connecticut, in 1857 to David Cummings Sprague and Frances Julia King Sprague, a school teacher. His mother died when he was ten, and he was sent by his father to live with an aunt in New York. He attended Drury High School in North Adams, Massachusetts, and excelled in mathematics. After graduating high school, Sprague went to Springfield, Massachusetts, to take an entrance exam for West Point, but somehow unexpectedly was taking the four-day entrance exam for the United States Naval Academy in Annapolis, Maryland. He got the highest score (twelve others took the exam), and to go to the school, he needed to borrow money. A local contractor and a bank loaned him four thousand dollars, and he travelled to Maryland. There, he graduated seventh (out of thirty-six) in the class of 1878.

== Career ==
=== United States Navy, inventor ===
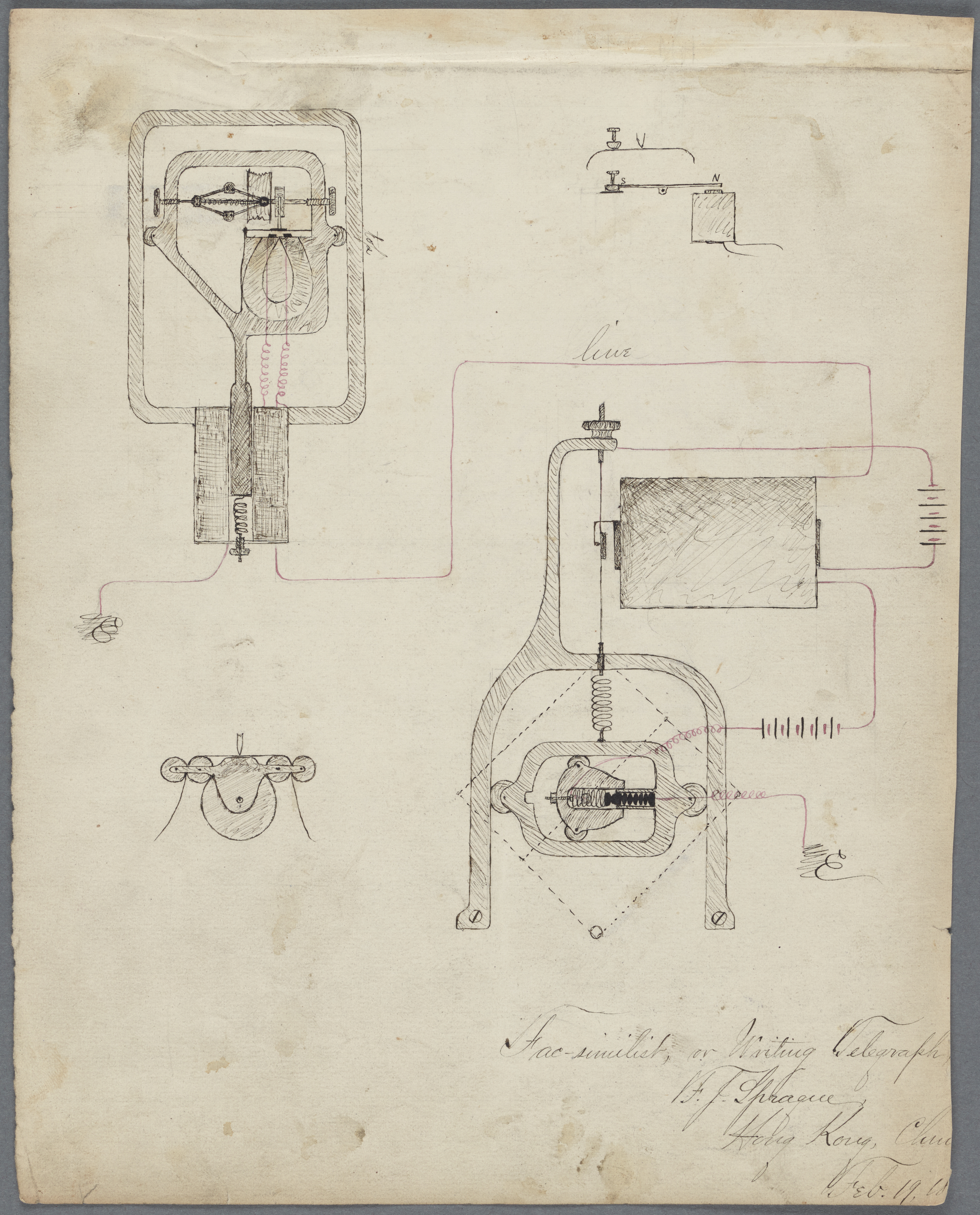
Notes on seamanship, with drawings of sailboat parts, and electrical equipment, by Frank J. Sprague, 1878-1880

He was commissioned as an ensign in the United States Navy. During his ensuing naval service, he first served on the USS Richmond, then the USS Minnesota. While in Asia, Sprague wrote stories he filed for the Boston Herald. While his ship was in Newport, Rhode Island, in 1881, Sprague invented the inverted type of dynamo. After he was transferred to the USS Lancaster, the flagship of the European Squadron, he installed the first electric call-bell system on a United States Navy ship. Sprague took leave to attend the International Exposition of Electricity of 1881 in Paris and the Crystal Palace Exhibition in Sydenham, England, in 1882, where he was on the jury of awards for gas engines, dynamos, and lamps.

=== Engineer for Edison ===
In 1883, Edward H. Johnson, a business associate of Thomas Edison, persuaded Sprague to resign his naval commission to work for Edison. Sprague, who began at a salary of $2,500, was neither happy with his salary nor his assignments. Sprague wanted to focus on motors, while motors bored Edison, who was consumed by making his incandescent lighting work. Edison sent Sprague to run the construction departments where Edison had built central power stations for his lighting systems in Sunbury, Pennsylvania, and Brockton, Massachusetts.

Sprague did important work for Edison, including correcting Edison's system of mains and feeders for central station distribution.

In 1884, he decided his interests in the exploitation of electricity lay elsewhere, and he left Edison to found the Sprague Electric Railway & Motor Company.

=== Electrical pioneer ===
By 1886, Sprague's company had introduced two important inventions: a constant-speed, non-sparking motor with fixed brushes, and regenerative braking, a method of braking that uses the drive motor to return power to the main supply system. His motor was the first to maintain constant speed under varying load. It was immediately popular and was endorsed by Edison as the only practical electric motor available. His regenerative braking system was important in the development of the electric train and the electric elevator.

=== Electric streetcars ===
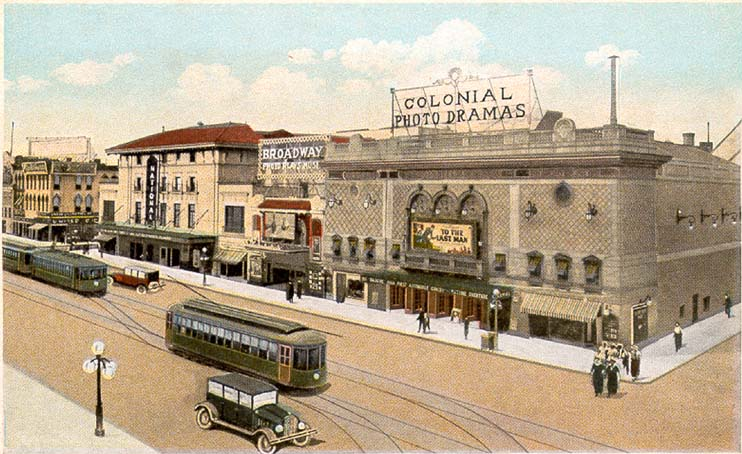
Postcard of electric trolley-powered streetcars of the Richmond Union Passenger Railway in Richmond, Virginia, in 1923, two generations after Frank J. Sprague successfully demonstrated his new system on the hills in 1888. The intersection shown is at 8th & Broad Streets.

Sprague's inventions included several improvements to designs for systems of electric streetcars collecting electricity from overhead lines. He improved designs for a spring-loaded trolley pole that had been developed in 1885 by Charles Van Depoele, devised a greatly improved mounting for streetcar motors and better gear designs, and proved that regenerative braking was practical. After testing his trolley system in late 1887 and early 1888, Sprague installed the first successful large electric street railway system – the Richmond Union Passenger Railway in Richmond, Virginia, which began passenger operation on February 2, 1888. Long a transportation obstacle, the hills of Richmond included grades of over 10%, and were an excellent proving ground for acceptance of his new technology in other cities, in contrast to the cable cars, which climbed the steepest grades of Nob Hill in San Francisco at the time.

By the summer of 1888, Henry M. Whitney of the West End Street Railway in Boston had witnessed the simultaneous startup of multiple streetcars on a single power source and had signed up for conversion. By January 1889, Boston had its first electric streetcars – which would be the first in the Americas to go underground, some eight years later, as the Tremont Street Subway – and which had become so popular and noteworthy that poet Oliver Wendell Holmes composed a verse about the new trolley pole technology, and the sparking contact shoe at its apex:

Since then on many a car you'll see
A broomstick as plain as plain can be;
On every stick there's a witch astride—
The string you see to her leg is tied.

Within a year, electric power had started to replace more costly horsecars in many cities. By 1889, 110 electric railways incorporating Sprague's equipment had been begun or planned on several continents. In 1890, Edison, who manufactured most of Sprague's equipment, bought him out, and Sprague turned his attention to electric elevators. However, he continued to be interested in the use of electricity for urban transportation and proposed a major expansion of London's Underground in 1901.

Sprague's system of electric supply was a great advantage in relation to the first bipolar U-tube overhead lines, in everyday use since 1883 on the Mödling and Hinterbrühl Tram.

=== Electric elevators ===
While electrifying the streetcars of Richmond, the increased passenger capacity and speed gave Sprague the notion that similar results could be achieved in vertical transportation — electric elevators. He saw that increasing the capacity of elevator shafts would not only save passengers' time but would also increase the earnings of tall buildings, with height limited by the total floor space taken up in the shaftways by slow hydraulic-powered elevators.

In 1892, Sprague founded the Sprague Electric Elevator Company. Working with Charles R. Pratt he developed the Sprague-Pratt Electric Elevator, the first of which was installed in the Postal Telegraph Building in 1894. The company developed floor control, automatic elevators, acceleration control of car safeties, and several freight elevators. The Sprague-Pratt elevator ran faster and with larger loads than hydraulic or steam elevators, and 584 elevators had been installed worldwide. Sprague sold his company to the Otis Elevator Company in 1895.

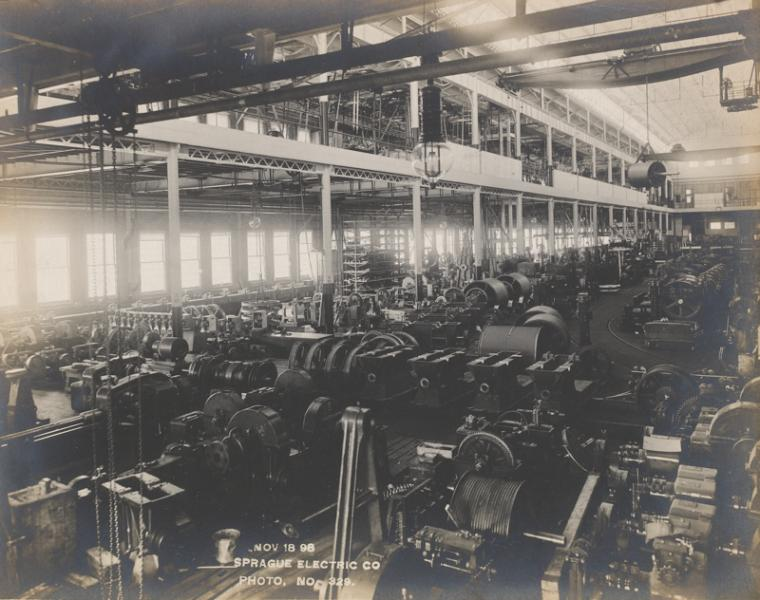
Sprague Electric Company, 1898

=== Multiple unit train controls ===
Sprague's experience with electric elevators led him to devise a multiple-unit system of electric railway operation, which accelerated the development of electric traction. In the multiple-unit system, each car of the train carries electric traction motors. By means of relays energized by train-line wires, the engineer (or motorman) commands all of the traction motors in the train to act together. For lighter trains, there is no need for locomotives, so every car in the train can generate revenue. Where locomotives are used, one person can control all of them.

Sprague's first multiple-unit order was from the South Side Elevated Railroad (the first of several elevated railways locally known as the "L") in Chicago, Illinois. This success was quickly followed by substantial multiple-unit contracts in Brooklyn, New York, and Boston, Massachusetts.

=== New York: Grand Central, elevators in skyscrapers ===
From 1896 to 1900 Sprague served on the Commission for Terminal Electrification of the New York Central Railroad, including the Grand Central Station in New York City, where he designed a system of automatic train control to ensure compliance with trackside signals. He founded the Sprague Safety Control & Signal Corporation to develop and build this system. Along with William J. Wilgus, he designed the Wilgus-Sprague bottom contact third rail system used by the railroads leading into Grand Central Terminal.

During World War I, Sprague served on the Naval Consulting Board. Then, in the 1920s, he devised a method for safely running two independent elevators, local and express, in a single shaft, to conserve floor space. He sold this system, along with systems for activating elevator car safety systems when acceleration or speed became too great, to the Westinghouse Company.

== Legacy ==
Sprague's developments in electric traction let cities grow larger, while his development of the elevator permitted greater concentration in their commercial sections and increased the profitability of commercial buildings. Sprague's inventions made modern light rail and rapid transit systems possible, which today still function on the same principles.

The iconic Sprague-Thomson rolling stock of the Paris Métro, in service from 1908 to 1983, are still referred to as les rames Sprague ("Sprague trainsets") today.

Sprague's engines were used as far afield as Sydney Harbour in Australia. A five-horsepower Lundell electric motor used at the Cockatoo Island Dockyard between 1900 and 1980 is now in the collection of the National Museum of Australia in Canberra.

== Awards and recognition ==
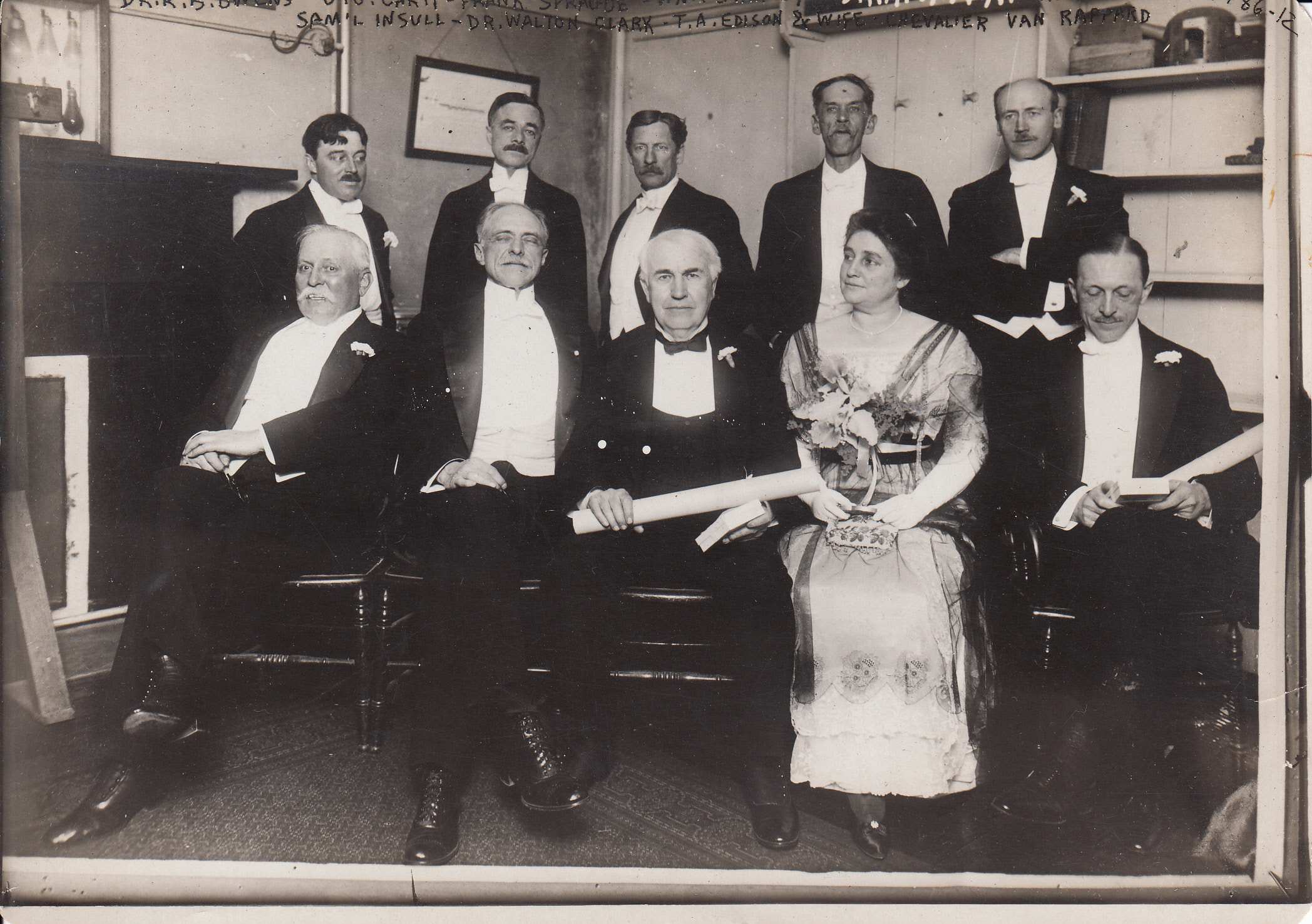
Presentation of the first Franklin Medal in Philadelphia in 1915; Sprague stands immediately behind Thomas Edison

Sprague was awarded the gold medal In Paris at the International Exposition of Electricity in 1889, the grand prize at the Louisiana Purchase Exposition in 1904, the Elliott Cresson Medal in 1904, and the Edison Medal of the American Institute of Electrical Engineers (now Institute of Electrical and Electronics Engineers), for "meritorious achievement in electrical science, engineering and arts as exemplified in his contributions thereto" in 1910.

In addition, he received the Franklin Medal in 1921 and was posthumously awarded the John Fritz Gold Medal in 1935.

== Personal life ==
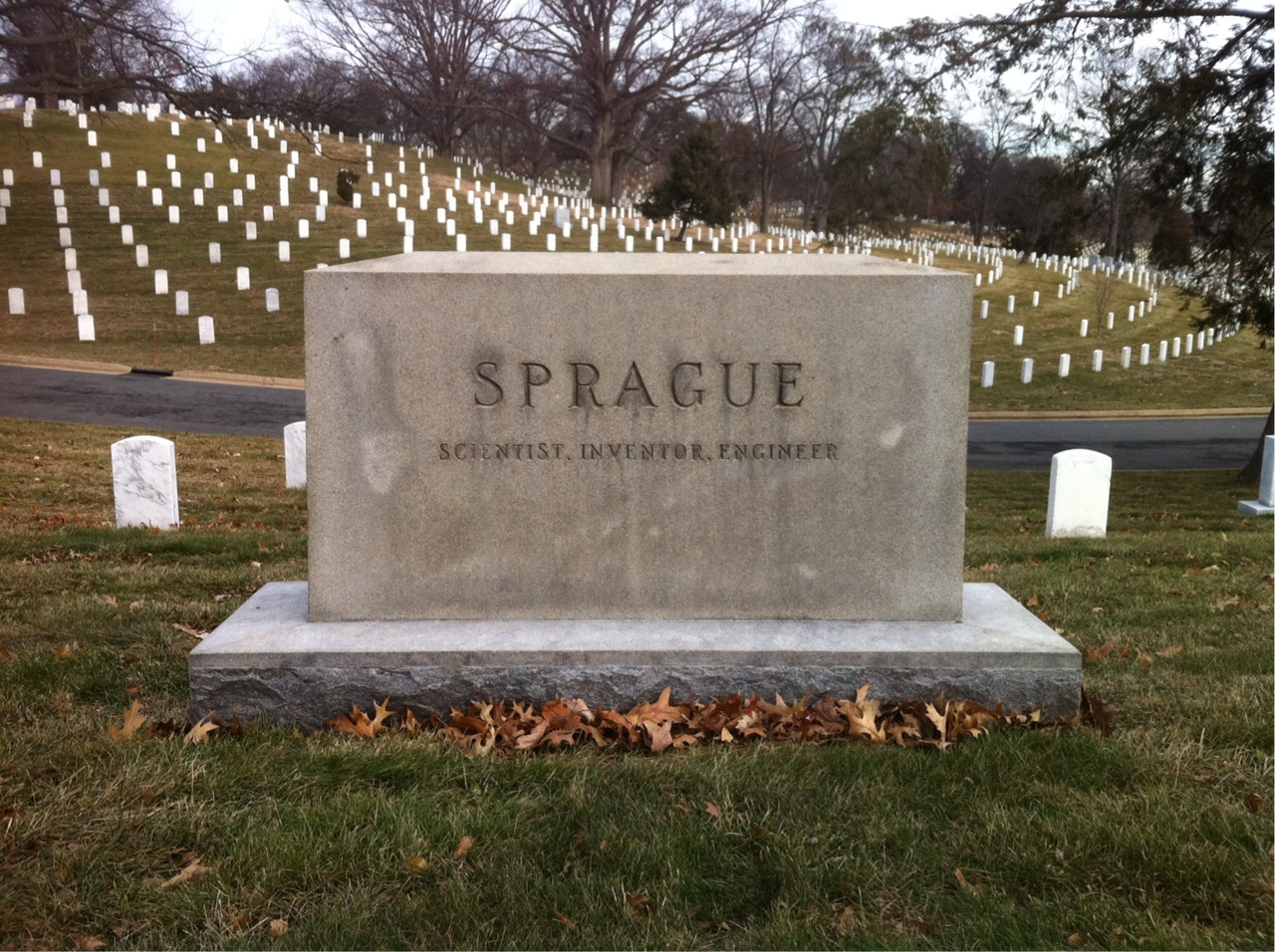
Grave at Arlington National Cemetery

Sprague was twice married, first to a Mary Keatinge, and thereafter to Harriet Chapman Jones. Frank and Mary had one son, Frank Desmond. Frank and Harriet had two sons and a daughter: Robert C. Sprague (also an inventor), Julian K. and Frances A. Remembering his father, Robert wrote in 1935:

All through his life and up to his last day, Frank Sprague had a prodigious capacity for work ... And once having made up his mind on a new invention or a new line of work, he was tireless and always striving for improvement. He had a brilliantly alert mind and was impatient of any half-way compromise. His interest in his work never ceased; only a few hours before the end, he asked to have a newly designed model of his latest invention brought to his bedside.

Sprague died on October 25, 1934. He was buried with full U.S. Navy honors at Arlington National Cemetery in Virginia. His wife Harriet was interred with him after her death in 1969. After Sprague's death, Harriet turned over a substantial amount of material from his collection to the New York Public Library, where it remains today accessible to the public via the rare books division. Other papers, including six volumes of congratulatory letters and photographs presented to Sprague on the occasion of his 75th birthday, are held at the Chapin Library, Williams College.

In 1959, Harriet Sprague donated funds for the Sprague Building at the Shore Line Trolley Museum at East Haven, Connecticut, not far from Sprague's boyhood home in Milford. The museum is the oldest operating trolley museum in the United States and has one of the largest collections of trolley artifacts in the United States.

Frank's son Robert C. Sprague would go on to found and lead the Sprague Electric Company as its president (1926–1953) and CEO (1953–1987). At its peak, Sprague Electric employed 12,000 people worldwide with plants in Scotland, France, Italy, and Japan, in addition to multiple locations in the United States, to become a leading manufacturer of capacitors and other electronic components. Sprague Electric was eventually acquired by General Cable in 1979 and then Vishay Intertechnology in 1992.

Frank and Harriet's grandson Peter Sprague, an entrepreneur, would become CEO of National Semiconductor (1965–1995).

== Tributes ==
In 1999, grandsons, John L. Sprague and Peter Sprague cut the ribbon and started an 1884 Sprague motor at a new exhibit at the Shore Line Trolley Museum, where a permanent exhibit, "Frank J. Sprague: Inventor, Scientist, Engineer", tells the story of the role of the "father of electric traction" and the role of electricity in the growth of cities.

In 2012, the Pennsylvania Trolley Museum adopted a stray cat, naming it after Sprague: Frank the Trolley Cat.

== In popular culture ==
In 2017, Sprague was the subject of an episode on season 29 of American Experience, a documentary series that was broadcast on PBS television stations. Titled The Race Underground, it partly chronicled the beginnings of the Boston-area MBTA's streetcar network, and described Sprague as "The Forgotten Hero of the American Subway".
