= Alfred P. Slaner =

American businessman

- Born: April 10, 1918; Hobart, Oklahoma
- Died: March 14, 1996 (aged 77)
- Known for: President of Kayser-Roth Corporation
- Spouse: Luella B. Slaner
- Family: Felix Zandman (cousin)

Alfred P. Slaner (April 10, 1918 – March 14, 1996) was an American businessman and one-time president of the Kayser-Roth Corporation.

== Biography ==
Slaner was born to a Jewish family in Hobart, Oklahoma. His father was an immigrant from Lithuania who moved to Oklahoma during the Land Rush of 1889 and opened the largest store in Hobart. Slaner graduated from the University of Oklahoma, and then went to work for his uncle, at the Chester H. Roth Hosiery Company eventually becoming president and negotiating its 1958 merger with Julius Kayser & Co to become Kayser-Roth. He remained as president until Kayser-Roth was sold to Gulf and Western in 1975. He developed Supp-Hose uplifting hosiery. His paternal cousin was Felix Zandman who founded Vishay Intertechnology Company with capital from Slaner.

Slaner later made money in electronics and became a major benefactor of the United Jewish Appeal. Among other achievements, he made the master list of Nixon political opponents.
