= Felix Zandman =

Polish-born American entrepreneur (1928–2011)

- Born: May 7, 1927
- Died: June 4, 2011 (age 84)
- Known for: Founder of Vishay Intertechnology
- Spouse: Ruta Zandman
- Children: 3
- Family: Alfred P. Slaner (cousin)

Felix Zandman (Polish: Feliks Zandman; May 7, 1927 – June 4, 2011) was a Polish-born American entrepreneur and founder of Vishay Intertechnology – one of the world's largest manufacturers of electronic components. From 1946 to 1949 he studied physics and engineering in France at the University of Nancy. In parallel, he was enrolled in a Grande école of engineering Ensem (École nationale supérieure d'électricité et de mécanique). He received a Ph.D. at the Sorbonne as a physicist on a subject of photoelasticity. He was awarded the Edward Longstreth Medal from the Franklin Institute in 1962.

== Childhood ==
Felix Zandman was born to a Jewish family in Grodno in the Second Polish Republic (now Belarus) and lived in Kresy until the Nazi-Soviet invasion of Poland. Following German Operation Barbarossa, in October 1941, at the age of 14 he arrived at the Grodno Ghetto (liquidated by the Nazis at the end of 1942) with parents, sisters, grandparents and many other relatives. He survived the Holocaust thanks to a family of Polish Righteous Jan and Anna Puchalski who hid him and his uncle for 17 months. Their main hiding place was a dugout 170 cm long, 150 cm wide and 120 cm tall.

Felix Zandman shared this hideaway with three other Jewish refugees. One of them, his uncle Sender Freydowicz, taught him trigonometry and advanced mathematics in the long hours of darkness. The advancing Soviet Army liberated them in July 1944. He stayed with other survivors in Poland until he was able to emigrate legally to France in the summer of 1946.

== Professional life as an employee ==
Zandman worked initially for two years as a lecturer at the École de l'air, the French Academy of Aeronautics. He then worked as an engineer in his specialty field of voltage measurement for a publicly owned company, which manufactured aircraft engines.

In 1956, Zandman presented his methods and self-developed instruments for the first time in the U.S.. He was able to establish important contacts with leading professors and well-known users of its specific field. He was eventually employed by the company Tatnall Measuring Systems in Philadelphia as director of basic research. Initially, he concentrated on measuring the development of his case, voltages of optical coatings. Then he developed a temperature-resistant electrical resistance. His employer, however, had no interest in the marketing of this invention.

== Professional life as an entrepreneur ==
In 1960 Felix Zandman and Sidney J. Stein presented a development of resistor film (an electrical component of very high temperature stability) and put the potential of this invention to develop, based on inventions made by previous researchers established in the industry. This component was called a metal foil resistor. In spite of the problems encountered, and working with many collaborators, it was possible to develop this resistor which had high precision and, above all, stability in the presence of extreme temperature changes such as those found in the aeronautical and space industry. In essence the metal foil resistor is a component formed by a ceramic base to which is attached a metal with a small thickness. Zandman's idea was as follows: Assuming that the component is at room temperature and the temperature then increases, the electrical resistance of the metal due to the increase in temperature also increases. As the temperature increases the metal tends to increase its length when it expands. However, being stuck to a ceramic structure with a much greater thickness, the metal can not expand lengthwise and its thickness increases instead, with a reduction in electrical resistance. The effect is that the increased resistance is compensated and hardly changes.

To this end he founded the company Vishay Intertechnology, Inc in 1962. His relative, Alfred P. Slaner, provided financial support for the initial funding. The company has developed into a Fortune 1000 company with many subsidiaries and over 22,000 employees worldwide. Vishay Intertechnology (NYSE: VSH) is a publicly traded company with a market capitalization of over a billion dollars. He received the Lazan Award from the Society for Experimental Mechanics in 1970 and subsequently named Fellow (1976) and Honorary Member (1996) of the society. The Society for Experimental Mechanics introduced the F. Zandman Award named after him in 1990.

== Personal story ==
In April 2008, Felix Zandman attended the March of the Living, where he shared the story of how he was rescued by Catholic Polish Righteous Among the Nations, Jan and Anna Puchalski, who hid him and his uncle for 17 months. His hiding place was a dugout 170 cm long, 150 cm wide and 120 cm tall that Felix Zandman shared with three other Jewish escapees. Felix Zandman told his story to thousands of young students from around the world who had gathered in Auschwitz-Birkenau to observe Holocaust Remembrance Day (Yom HaShoah) He was survived by his wife, Ruta Zandman and three children: Dr. Gisele Zandman Goddard, Ariele Zandman Klausner, and Marc Zandman.

== Book and documentary ==
His autobiography "Never the last journey" co-written with David Chanoff was published in 1995.

Zandman's life was the subject of the 2015 documentary "The Last Victory - the Story of Felix Zandman" which was directed by Haim Hecht and produced by Roy Mandel.
