= Jan and Anna Puchalski =

Jan and Anna Puchalski were a Polish husband and wife who lived in the village of Łosośna in north-eastern Poland on the outskirts of Grodno (now 20 km into Belarus) during the Nazi German occupation of Poland. Together, they rescued Polish Jews from the Holocaust, including escapees from the ghetto in Grodno before its brutal liquidation. The Puchalskis were posthumously bestowed the titles of Righteous Among the Nations by Yad Vashem in June 1986. Their medals of honor were presented to their surviving children at a ceremony in Jerusalem on June 14, 1987, during which Irena Puchalska-Bagińska, Zdzisław, son of Sabina Puchalska-Kazimierczyk, Władysław Puchalski and Krystyna Puchalska-Maciejewska planted a tree in the Garden of the Righteous at Yad Vashem.

The Puchalski family at Yad Vashem saying a prayer, June 1987. Kneeling from the left to right: Zdzisław Kazimierczyk, Wanda Puchalska-Neubert, Władysław Puchalski, Irena Puchalska-Bagińska, and Krystyna Puchalska-Maciejewska

At the onset of World War II, Jan Puchalski worked at a tobacco company, where he earned a small salary. The Puchalskis resided as innkeepers in a summer cottage, in the Łosośna forest. The cottage was owned by an entrepreneurial Zandman family who leased similar cottages to city tourists before the war, with Grodno’s reputation as a retreat, confirmed by its century-old summer palace of the Polish kings. The Puchalskis were very poor, having to support five children: 15-, 16-, and 17-year-old daughters and two toddlers (Władysław and Wanda) age 1 and 2. On the evening of the Nazi German murderous raid on Grodno Ghetto which took place on February 13, 1943, six Jews who escaped, showed up at Puchalskis door. Among them, much-loved Felix Zandman of the Zandman family (age 15) who used to play with their children before the war, Sender Freydowicz (his uncle) who lost his wife and two children to the Nazis, Mottel Bass and his wife Goldie, and two more Jewish fugitives. They stayed with the Puchalskis for 17 months. Meanwhile, the ghetto in Grodno was razed by the Germans with all of its 29,000 Jews deported in Holocaust trains, and exterminated in gas chambers of Auschwitz and Treblinka.

== Dugout under the bedroom floor ==
At first, the six Jews hid outside the house in a cellar, which was not safe enough, with the Nazi threat of the death penalty looming over everyone, including the Puchalski children. Subsequently, with the help of the family, a dugout was built under one of their two bedrooms, occupied by three elder sisters (Sabina, Irena and Krystyna) who kept watch. The dugout was very small. The entrance was through a narrow opening beneath the bed and covered with a wooden trap. An air duct was made leading out to the garden with an opening covered under the bushes. For added security, Jan Puchalski moved the dog kennel to that place. Sabina used to bring food down for the runaway fugitives and take their waste away. The Jews soon realized that the hide-out was too small to contain six people. The insufficient air supply prompted two of the hiders to leave and seek help elsewhere. Mottel Bass, a lawyer by profession, had some money, which helped the Puchalskis with their new expenses.

When German soldiers retreating before the advancing Russian front settled in the house, four Jews slipped out at night and wandered for several days. They caught-up with the Soviets and were liberated on July 24. Felix Zandman and Sender Freydowicz soon emigrated to France, where Felix obtained an engineering degree and earned a doctorate in physics at the Sorbonne. He became an entrepreneur in aeronautics. In 1986 Zandman submitted his testimony to Yad Vashem with other survivors. As a result, in June 1986 the Puchalskis were posthumously awarded the title of Righteous Among the Nations. A year later, on June 14, 1987, their surviving children visited Jerusalem and planted a tree in the Garden of the Righteous at Yad Vashem. Felix Zandman who was at the ceremony remarked: "The Puchalskis never lost courage, never. We lost courage. They built our morale up." Also, Jan and Anna Puchalski were awarded the Anti-Defamation League's Courage to Care Award in the form of a bronze plaque by artist Arbit Blatas, presented to their children by the ADL's National Director, Abraham Foxman.

== See also ==
- Rescue of Jews by Poles during the Holocaust
