= Julius Kayser =

American businessman

- Born: 1838; New York City
- Died: 1920 (age 82); New York City
- Known for: Founder of The Julius Kayser Company
- Spouse: Henrietta Kayser
- Children: 1

Julius Kayser (1838–1920) was an American businessman and founder of The Julius Kayser Company (now Kayser-Roth).

== Biography ==
Slaner was born to a Jewish family in New York City, the son of immigrants from Germany. His family moved to Hornell, New York where they manufactured silk gloves. Kayser developed and patented a unique glove with reinforced fingertips that set him apart from the competition. In the 1880s, he opened a factory in Brooklyn. In 1911, he expanded into silk underwear, veils, and lingerie.

Recognising the power of the new media (as large circulation fashion magazines such as Vogue and Cosmopolitan were exploding in popularity), Kayser devoted a great deal of time and energy into domestic and even international advertising - a move that brought immediate returns and rapid expansion.

By 1913, he had over 2,500 employees and by 1916, he had 14 mills employing over 7,500. In addition to his large mill in Brooklyn, most of the mills were in New York state (Hornell, Walton, Sidney, Owego, Schenectady, Binghamton, Amsterdam, Syracuse, Buffalo, Monticello and Rockville Center).

In 1958, his company was merged into the Chester H. Roth Hosiery Company in 1958 to become Kayser-Roth with Alfred P. Slaner as president. In 1975, Kayser-Roth was sold to Gulf and Western and in 1993, it was sold to Mexican hosiery manufacturer Grupo Synkro for US$230,000,000.

== Personal life and philanthropy ==
He was a prominent donor to Jewish causes, including the Hebrew Orphan Asylum and the Hebrew Hospital. He was married to Henrietta Kayser; they had one daughter, who remained unmarried. He died in 1920.
