= Prysmian Group =

Italian multinational corporation

Prysmian S.p.A.

- The Prysmian Group headquarters in Milan
- Type: Public (Società per azioni)
- Traded as: BIT: PRY; FTSE MIB component
- Industry: Electrical cable; manufacturing; engineering; Technology
- Predecessors: Pirelli Cavi e Sistemi
- Founded: 1879; 147 years ago as Pirelli Cavi e Sistemi
- Headquarters: Milan, Italy
- Area served: Worldwide
- Key people: Francesco Gori (Chairman); Massimo Battaini (CEO)
- Products: Submarine communications cable; Telecommunications cable; Electrical cable; Fiber-optic cable
- Revenue: ▲€20.13 billion (2025)
- Operating income: ▲€1.92 billion (2025)
- Net income: ▲€1.27 billion (2025)
- Total assets: ▲€20.19 billion (2025)
- Total equity: ▲€6.68 billion (2025)
- Number of employees: 33,161 (2024)
- Website: www.prysmian.com

Prysmian S.p.A. is a multinational company with headquarters in Bicocca, Milan, Italy, specializing in the production, installation and maintenance of electrical cables and optical cables for digital connections. Prysmian is present all over the world with 109 plants, 29 in North America, 13 in LATAM, 50 in EMEA.

Prysmian was formerly part of Pirelli. It was spun off in 2005 as a stand-alone company, and listed in 2007.

It is the world's largest cable manufacturer and a global leader in the energy and telecommunications cable industry. The company is listed on the Borsa Italiana in the FTSE MIB index, with a market capitalisation of approximately €42 billion as of May 2026.

On 4 December 2017, it took over 100% of the General Cable group in the US, to then complete the merger by incorporation the following year.

== History ==
=== The beginning ===
The company originated in 1879 as Pirelli Cavi e Sistemi. In 1881, it secured a contract to produce submarine telegraph cables for military engineering.

In 1886, it opened a submarine cable production plant in La Spezia. It later helped to lay the entire Italian telegraph network on behalf of the Italian state-owned company Telegrafi dello Stato, and to install the electrical grid for domestic use in Milan. It also laid telegraph cables in the colonies of Italian East Africa.

In 1925, it produced 5,150 km of submarine telegraph cabling for Italcable for communications between Italy and South America. Its collaboration with the Italian government continued with the laying of cables for the Italian interurban telephone network.

=== Prysmian ===
In 2005, Prysmian S.r.l. was created by Goldman Sachs after acquiring Pirelli & C. S.p.A's Cables and Systems business. After restructuring the organisation of the group's internal activities, the company decided to sell down its investment in the cable market. The figure negotiated was EUR 1.3 billion: Goldman Sachs gave Pirelli 225 million and the rest (more than one billion) was a debt that would be paid off the back of the new business. The company, led by Valerio Battista from 2005, was then a public company.

Since 3 May 2007, it has been listed on the Milan Stock Exchange and on 24 September 2007 it joined the S&P MIB index of the biggest Italian companies.

At the end of 2009, Goldman Sachs decided to sell down its stake, which was completed in March 2010.

In February 2011, Prysmian successfully made a takeover bid of EUR 840 million for Dutch company Draka, with headquarters in Eindhoven, which at the time was fourth in the world in the cable and optical fibre sector.

In December 2017, it bought the American (and rival) company General Cable based in Kentucky. A transaction of almost three billion dollars, consisting of equity (1.5 billion) and financial debt. This merged the leading cable-making company in the world in terms of revenue (Prysmian) and the fourth (General Cable), creating a group with a revenue of EUR 10 billion, EBIDTA (earnings before interest, taxes, depreciation and amortisation) of EUR 840 million and over 28,000 employees.

=== Acquisition of General Cable ===
The General Cable group was valued at 3 billion dollars with a price premium of approximately 81% to General Cable's share value on the last day of trading.

The acquisition was unanimously approved by the two Boards of Directors and would create a company in 50 countries with 31,000 employees, which could generate revenue of 11 billion dollars a year, based on estimates from the 2017 financial statements. The integration was expected to cost 220 million dollars. The price per share paid to General Cable was 30 dollars, versus a Prysmian dividend that was halved in 2011 after the acquisition of Draka, and stable at 43 cents per share. The General Cable group has one billion dollars of debt.

Already the leading cable company in the world, with such "pro-forma" earnings, it would become twice as large as its second main competitor. Prysmian declared that it expects to increase its capital by more than 500 million in light of further acquisitions.

The transaction was subject to approval by the antitrust authorities of the two countries.

Its completion would create a market concentration in a strategic sector for public safety and economic development, which was already established by no more than ten competitors across Italy, the US and China. Other oligopolies exist in the fixed and mobile telephony sectors in various countries, partly due to the existence of natural monopolies.

=== Activity ===
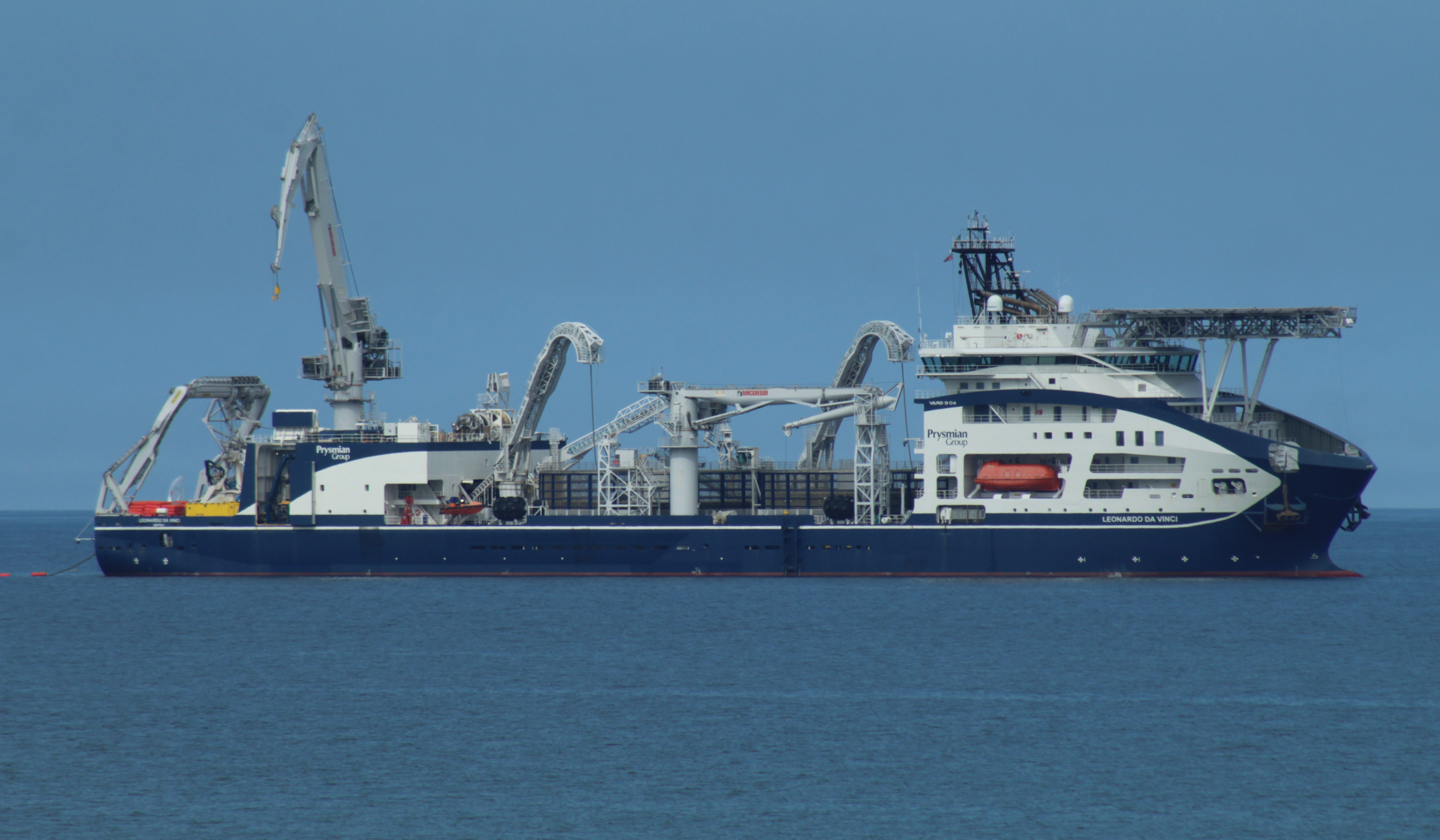
Prysmian Group's cable-laying ship Leonardo Da Vinci moored off Saltburn

The company is the global leader in the cable systems sector. Specifically, Prysmian produces and lays underground and submarine cables for the transmission and distribution of electricity, as well as specialised cables for use in various industrial contexts, and medium- and low-voltage cables for construction and infrastructure. For telecoms, the Group produces copper cables, optical cables and optical fibre cables for the transmission of data, video and sound.

On the customer's request, Prysmian also designs and produces key systems and takes care of post-installation maintenance.

Every year, Prysmian invests more than EUR 100 million in research and development. This has allowed the Group to develop innovations like BendBrightXS 180μm, the narrowest bend-insensitive optical fibre, and FlexRibbon, which, with 6,912 fibres, is the optical cable with the highest number of fibres in the sector.

The company also developed the P-Laser technology for cabling systems, which combines greater transmission capacity and eco-sustainability, using 100% recyclable materials and cutting carbon emissions by 40%.

By 2022, Prysmian has planned to invest around EUR 450 million to net-zero the Group's CO_{2} emissions and improve the sustainability of its supply chain. An ambitious commitment, aligned with the objectives of the Paris Agreement, which would be executed with support from the non-profit organisation Carbon Trust.

For 2021, Prysmian confirmed the launch of the new Leonardo da Vinci cable-laying vessel, which will be the longest in the world at 171 metres.

In Italy, Prysmian is active in Merlino, Giovinazzo, Pignataro Maggiore, Quattordio, Livorno, Pozzuoli and Battipaglia.

Since the acquisition of General Cable, it is in more than 50 countries with 104 facilities and over 28,000 employees.

== Finances ==
	2016	2017	2018	2019	2020	2021	2022	2023	2024	2025
Total revenue (€ bn)	7.6	8.0	10.3	11.5	10.0	12.7	16.1	15.3	17.0	19.7
Net profit (€ bn)	0.2	0.2	0.1	0.3	0.2	0.3	0.5	0.5	0.7	1.3
Total assets (€ bn)	6.3	6.7	10.1	10.5	9.9	12.0	12.8	13.3	18.2	20.2
Total equity (€ bn)	1.7	1.7	2.5	2.6	2.4	3.1	3.8	4.0	5.3	6.7
Employees	20,493	21,050	29,159	28,714	28,321	29,763	30,185	30,088	33,161	34,368

== Shareholders ==
As of 31 December 2023, the largest shareholders of Prysmian were:

- BlackRock, Inc. – 6.8%
- T. Rowe Price Group, Inc. – 4.0%
- Crédit Agricole S.A. – 3.8%
- Sun Life Financial, Inc. – 3.4%
- Own shares – 3.0%
- Fidelity Investments – 3.0%
- The Vanguard Group, Inc. – 2.9%
- UBS AG – 2.9%
- Baillie Gifford & Co – 2.6%
- Norges Bank – 2.0%
- Valerio Battista – 1.45%
- Intesa Sanpaolo Eurizon – 0.4%
- Others – 63.7%
