= Sprague Electric =

American electrotechnical company

Coordinates: 42°42′5″N 73°6′59″W

- Logo used from 1962 to 1985

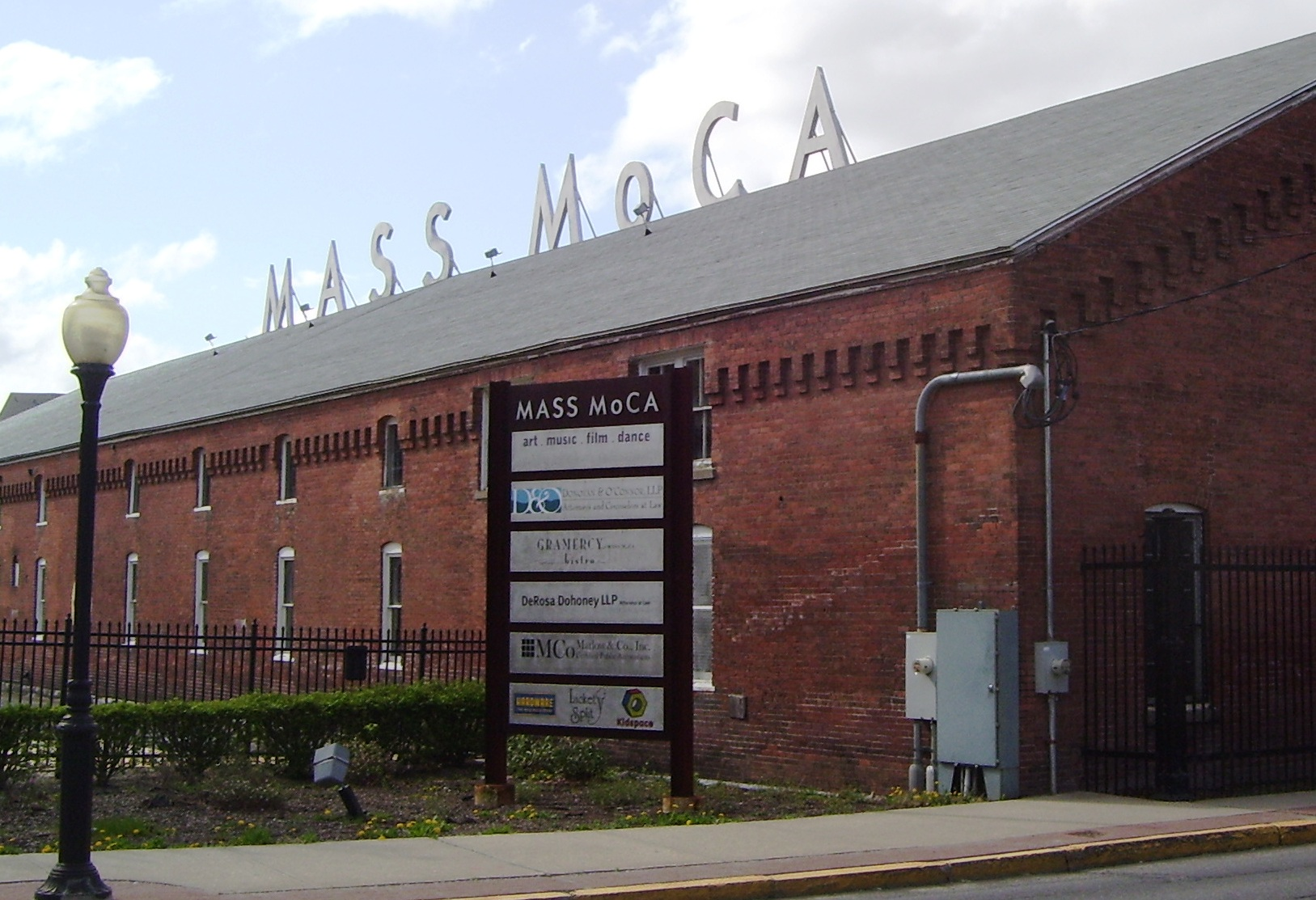
- The site of Sprague Electric headquarters in North Adams, Massachusetts, now owned by MASS MoCA
- Formerly: Sprague Specialties Company (1926 to 1942)
- Type: Subsidiary of Vishay
- Industry: Electronic components
- Founded: 1926; 100 years ago
- Founders: Robert C. Sprague
- Fate: Acquired by General Cable in 1978, acquired by Penn Central in 1982, sold off in early 1990s
- Headquarters: North Adams, Massachusetts
- Products: Capacitors

Sprague Electric Company was an electronic component maker founded by Robert C. Sprague in 1926. It was best known for making a large line of capacitors used in a wide variety of electrical and electronic in commercial, industrial and military/space applications. Other products include resistive components, magnetic components (transformers and coils), filter assemblies, semiconductors and integrated circuits.

== History overview ==
In 1926, Sprague used $25,000 of his savings to open Sprague Specialties Company at his home in Quincy, MA. One of his first products was the mini condenser, an old name for capacitor. Mini condensers were commonly used in radio applications for noise filtering, signal coupling and tone controls. Early capacitors were two pieces of metal foil wrapped between wax paper or any other type of suitable insulation material. The type of insulating material determined the capacitor's capacitance and maximum voltage. Capacitors are also useful in high power applications like motors, and soon Sprague turned his attention those areas as well.

Sprague found a sustainable product line in capacitors. The increase in the types of radios using AC created demand for many different types of capacitors. By 1929, Sprague Specialties Company needed a bigger facility, and in 1930 Sprague purchased a plant on Beaver Street in North Adams, MA, in Berkshire County. When local residents heard the company was expanding, Sprague received all kinds of incentives from the banks and other businesses to relocate there. Sprague chose the area because he wanted to open a shop where his father Frank had grown up.

By the mid-1930s Sprague had become a recommended source for capacitors by radio manufacturers, radio repair and many electrical applications. As the size of the company grew, there was a desire from the manufacturing workers to form an organized labor union. The Wagner Act of 1935 prohibited company unions. In 1937, the company agreed with the workers to form an independent union, the Independent Condenser Workers Union.

From 1936–1944, the Sprague Specialties Company sales increased seven-fold. Expansion put a damper to profits. For many years the company sustained losses. Robert felt strongly connected to his company and to the people of North Adams, and always tried to consider the company's effects as the largest employer in town.

Sprague purchased the Arnold Print Works plant in North Adams, Massachusetts, which became the permanent headquarters and principal manufacturing site for Sprague Specialties Company.

By 1942 the Sprague Specialties Company had relocated to the abandoned Arnold Print Works Facility on Marshall St. This became the main facility, and eventually consisted of 26 buildings that were interconnected by tunnels and bridges. Former employees remember the complex layout and interesting ways to get from one department to another. Previous to the Sprague Specialties Company, the Arnold Print Works had been the largest employer in North Adams, operating in the area from 1860–1942.

In 1942, the company's name was changed from Sprague Specialty Products to Sprague Electric. The Sprague Electric name remained until its last owner Penn Central started to sell off pieces of its Sprague division in the early 1990s.

== The Sprague Log (1938–1985) ==
Beginning in 1938, as CEO, Sprague tried to bridge the gap between the employees and the business, with the publication of the Sprague Log. Sprague used this newsletter to bring management and workers closer, and to maintain morale after forcing workers to take a 10% pay cut that same year. The publication was divided into two sections. Part 1 discussed the company accomplishments, achievements and the loyalty of Sprague employees, often spotlighting individuals. Part 2 contained employee announcements: births and weddings, social activities, and other family events.

== Sprague Electric: Early years (1942–1960) ==
After the Japanese attack on Pearl Harbor on December 7, 1941 and the declaration of war that followed, US manufacturing stopped commercial production and switched to wartime activities. Sprague Electric's participation in the US war effort improved its reputation, future contracts, and sales, and propelled the Sprague name to the forefront of the growing American electronic business.

One of Sprague Electric's biggest contributions to the war effort was in the manufacturing of the variable timing proximity fuse. The proximity fuse was a small transmitter, and in some cases a receiver, built on a bomb or artillery shell that would detonate the bomb or shell before impact, causing greater destruction. Sprague Electric continued to make capacitor and resistive components to meet military requirements of quality and reliability. Robert C. Sprague was also a member of War Production Board for the Advisory Committee on Capacitors (1942-1945).

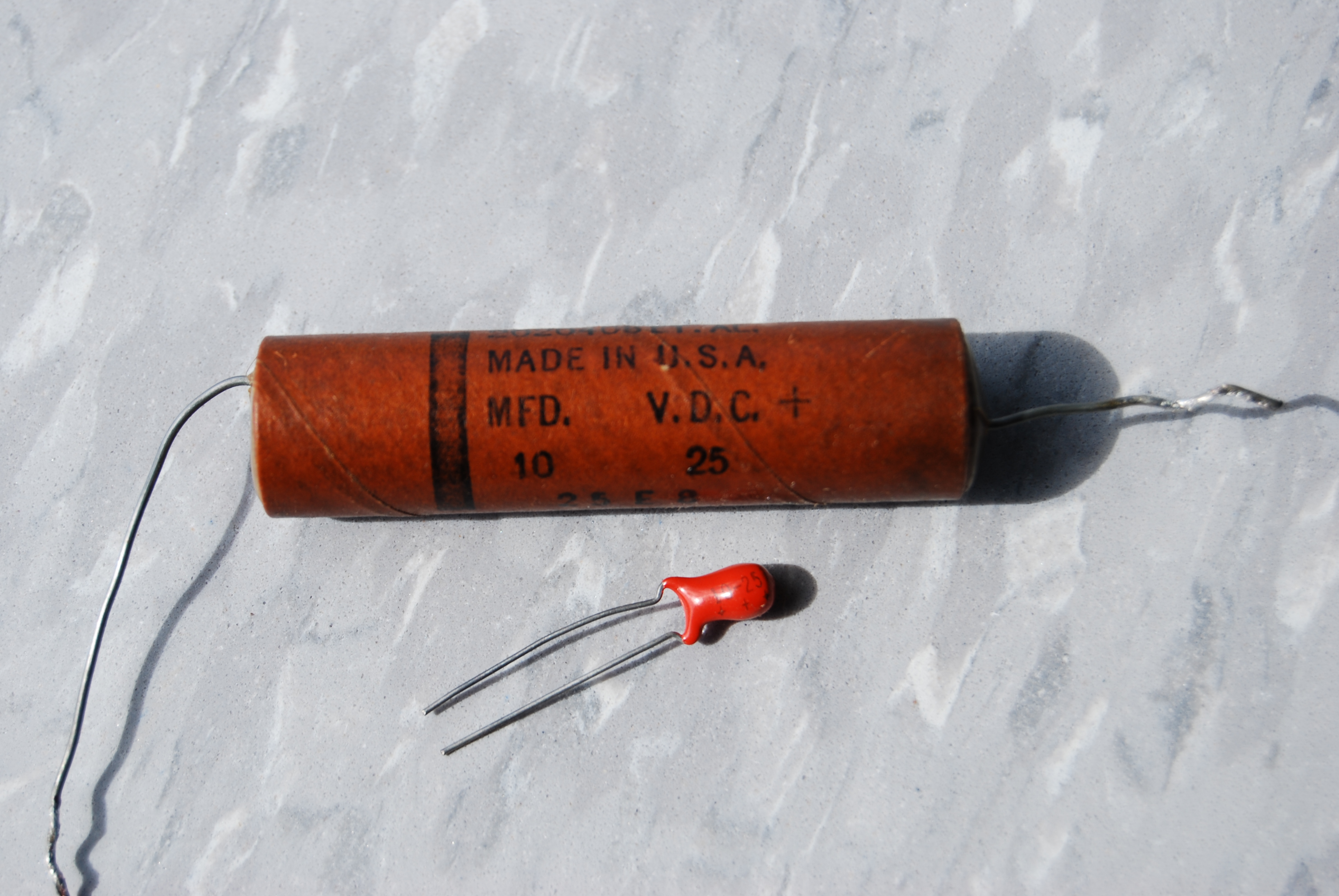
Tantalum vs aluminum oxide electrolytic capacitors. A size comparison of two equal value capacitors. The larger is from around 1946 and the smaller is a Sprague tantalum capacitor from the 1980s

During the Second World War, Sprague invented the tantalum capacitor. The use of tantalum allows capacitors to achieve high values of electron storage or capacitance along with higher operating voltages, shrinking the capacitor to a fraction of the size of a more conventional design. Vishay Intertechnology, which currently owns the Sprague capacitor brand, calls their tantalum capacitors the Sprague tantalum.

=== Post World War II ===
After the Second World War, Sprague Electric retooled for the commercial and industrial products market. Eventually Sprague capacitors and resistive products became a widely-known brand name. Radio and television manufacturers like RCA, Zenith and Philco continued to use Sprague Electric products. Sprague Electric products were also found in stores selling electronic parts, and the electronics servicing business. In 1946 Howard W. Sams (SAMS Publishing) introduced their Photofact Servicing manuals, which were a valuable resource for the service of consumer electronics. Sprague Electric capacitors were listed as a recommended replacement part.

Sprague Electric flourished during the Cold War and the Space Race because of their reputation and experience in the building of military components. By 1954. most of Sprague Electric's sales and profits were from the TV and radio markets; military products sales were second. Sales reached almost $50 million. Also in 1954, the company built new capacitor plants in North Carolina and in the US territory of Puerto Rico. It was the beginning of Robert C. Sprague's dream to make Sprague Electric into a major corporation. This expansion continued into the late 1960s.

Sales of Sprague Electric products remained steady from 1954-1958 at just below $50 million. The company continued to expand its product base by opening a semiconductor plant in New Hampshire in 1957 and a magnetics plant in California. As the company grew, union membership (Independent Condenser Workers Union #2) grew as well. By November 1956, straight hourly workers wages were tied to the Bureau of Labor Statistics Consumer Price Index. Workers received better benefits. The Sprague Log recorded in this in a "Special Negotiations Supplement."

== Sprague Electric: Expansion, growth and difficulties (1960–1971) ==
In 1959, Sprague Electric achieved $50 million in sales. Robert C. Sprague continued as Chairman of the Board and his brother Julian as President. With advances in the integrated circuit and thin film technologies, Sprague saw a need to move to support and design products around these new technologies. Thin film products and integrated circuits lead to more compact circuit designs and smaller products. Sprague understood this as the future trend in electronics. He opened more plants in the United States and developed a worldwide network of sales offices.

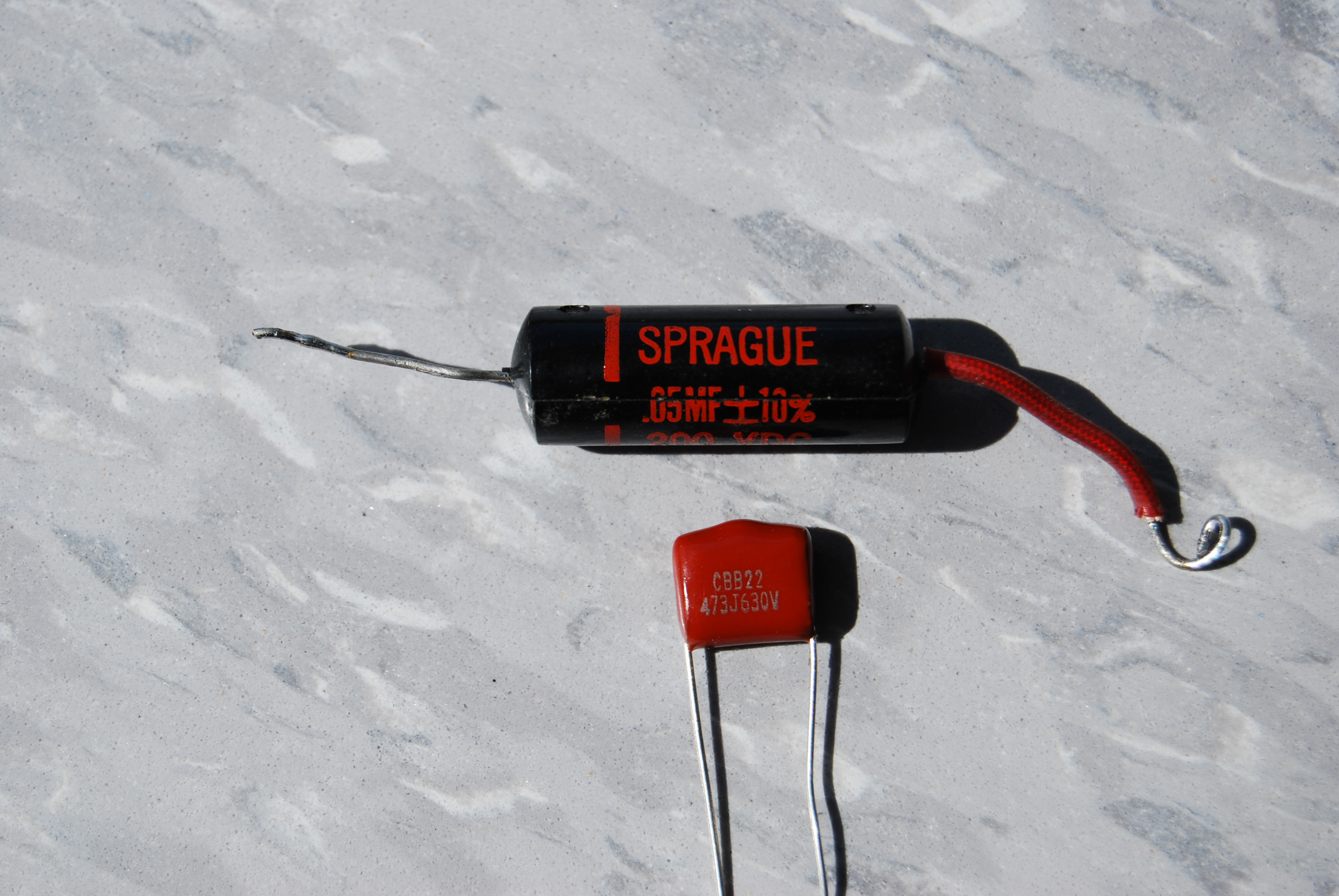
A comparison of non-film and film capacitors. The larger is a 1950s Sprague Black Beauty. The smaller is polyethylene film from the 2000s. Both have identical capacitance but the film has 3 times the voltage rating.

By 1960, Sprague Electric had manufacturing plants in North Carolina, New Hampshire, Vermont, Wisconsin, Virginia, Maryland and California. Many were involved in making capacitors that used thin film technology. This proved to be a very important product for Sprague Electric. These plants also produced magnetic products such as transformers and inductors. With advances in transistor and integrated circuit technology, later computer chips, resistance to noise interference became a factor. Magnetics played a role in reducing noise interference.

Sprague got into the semiconductor business in the late 1950s, somewhat later than the already established semiconductor firms. Fairchild Camera, directed by Robert Noyce, marketed the first commercial integrated circuit as early as 1963. Sprague wanted to be an early participant into this young product. They set up a group at the New Hampshire facility where thin film capacitors were made. In 1965, Sprague Electric acquired Micro Tech (Sunnyvale, CA), a manufacturer of semiconductor equipment for fabrication.

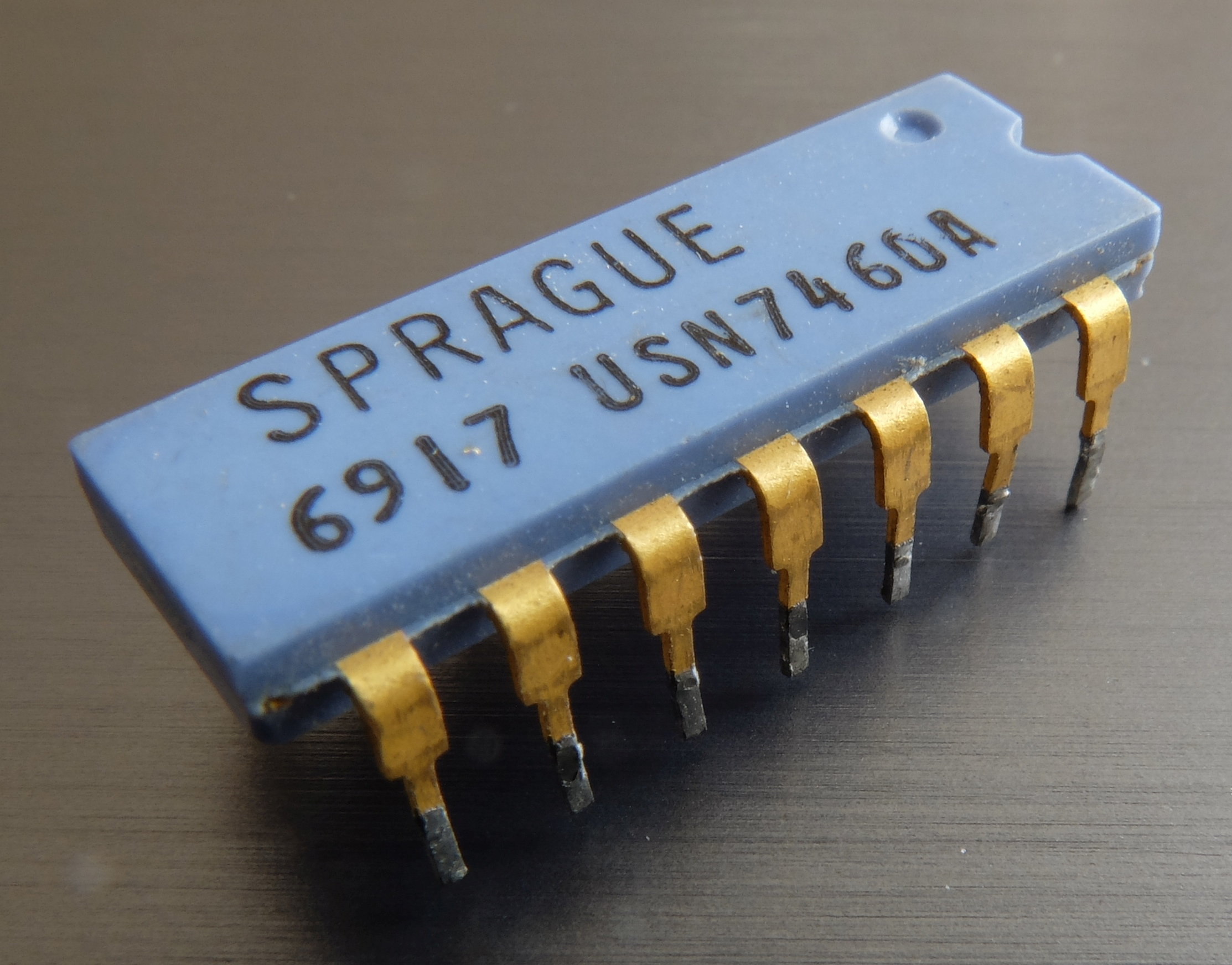
A Sprague 7400-series integrated circuit USN7460A

By 1966 Sprague opened a brand new facility in Worcester, MA dedicated to semiconductor and integrated circuit fabrication. The new factory was headed by Dr. John L. Sprague, the youngest son of Robert C. Sprague. John Sprague was a graduate of Stanford University, and specialized in semiconductor development. Eventually the Micro Tech was moved to the same area. However Sprague's plans for Micro Tech never blossomed, and they wound up making capacitors. Robert C. Sprague's heavy investment in the semiconductor business reduced income for the company.

Sales of Sprague Electric products were $100 million by 1966 and the workforce increased to over 12,000. As the company grew, management was reorganized, and more expansion occurred, in the form of external partnerships. This rapid expansion served to keep profits down. Expansion did not have much impact on wages, benefits and working conditions.

As one local historian put it, Robert Sprague's view of his employees was "paternalistic". In March 1970, a major labor strike started and affected all areas of the company. The strike lasted 10 weeks and was ultimately settled by a federal mediator. While Robert C. Sprague and the Union representatives shook hands after the settlement, the results had a negative effect on future of the company, its management and employees.

== Sprague Electric: Later years (1970–1978) ==
With the end of the 1970 strike, Robert C. Sprague retired as chief executive and was succeeded by Neal W. Welch. Although the workers got some of what they demanded, the strike and the new contract devastated the company. Sprague Electric made cuts to minimize costs, including reducing the labor force and shuttering some of its North Adams operations.

Employee morale plummeted, which was reflected in the rapid decline of the company's newsletter, the Sprague Log during this period. The paper was only published twice a year, then not all until 1978. In 1978, the company was sold to General Cable, which later was taken over by Penn Central in 1981.

=== Closing of the North Adams facility and its future ===
In the 1980s, Sprague Electric was a division of Penn Central. In 1981, John L. Sprague, the younger son of Robert C. Sprague, was named chief executive. John Sprague tried to bring the employees and management closer together. The Sprague Log increased its frequency of publication, and again emphasized the need to work together. During his leadership, sales of Sprague Electric products still grew steadily but not the company's profits. Capacitor products from overseas as well as other electrical and electronic components were cutting into sales from US manufacturers.

By the 1980s, many electronic assembly plants were overseas, and there was more inclination to buy local or from areas closer to assembly. This was an area in which Sprague Electric could not compete. Even though sales of Sprague products reached $500 million in the mid-1980s, the Sprague division continued to reorganize. In 1985, it was announced that the Sprague division headquarters would move to Lexington, Massachusetts, and the North Adams plant would close down.

As a company, Penn Central focused on profits. It viewed Sprague Electric performance as unsatisfactory, and gradually closed or sold off operations. Sprague was spun off from Penn Central in 1987 under the holding company Sprague Technologies. In 1990, Sprague sold its semiconductor unit to Sanken Electric of Japan. Many of the capacitor products were sold in 1993 to Vishay, a leading manufacturer of components used in electronics for industrial and military/space applications.

After Sprague Electric's permanent closing in North Adams, the population of North Adams dropped by 4,000 and the unemployment climbed to 14%. The biggest employer was gone and the site was rusting and decaying. Removal and cleanup of the industrial waste, including carcinogenic polychlorinated biphenyls (PCBs) were lingering problems. In 1996, 17 homes were demolished on Alton Place, Avon and West Main Streets in the Braytonville area due to the vaporizing of a toxic trichloroethylene (TCE) plume of groundwater seeping west from the Brown Street site.

=== Massachusetts Museum of Contemporary Art ===
In 1986, Thomas Krens, director of Williams College Museum of Art, was looking for an exhibit space for large-scale contemporary art works. The mayor of North Adams, John Barrett III, suggested the abandoned Sprague Electric facility.

In 1999, after years of demolition, cleanup, restoration, and construction, the Massachusetts Museum of Contemporary Art (MASS MoCA) opened. Twenty-five of the 26 original buildings were restored, including many of the interconnecting bridges and tunnels. The Marshall Street site was listed in the National Historic Register. MASS MoCA is the largest contemporary art museum in the United States. Its location is a multiuse site, with the museum, offices, businesses, and recreation and special activity areas.

== Legacy of Sprague Capacitors ==
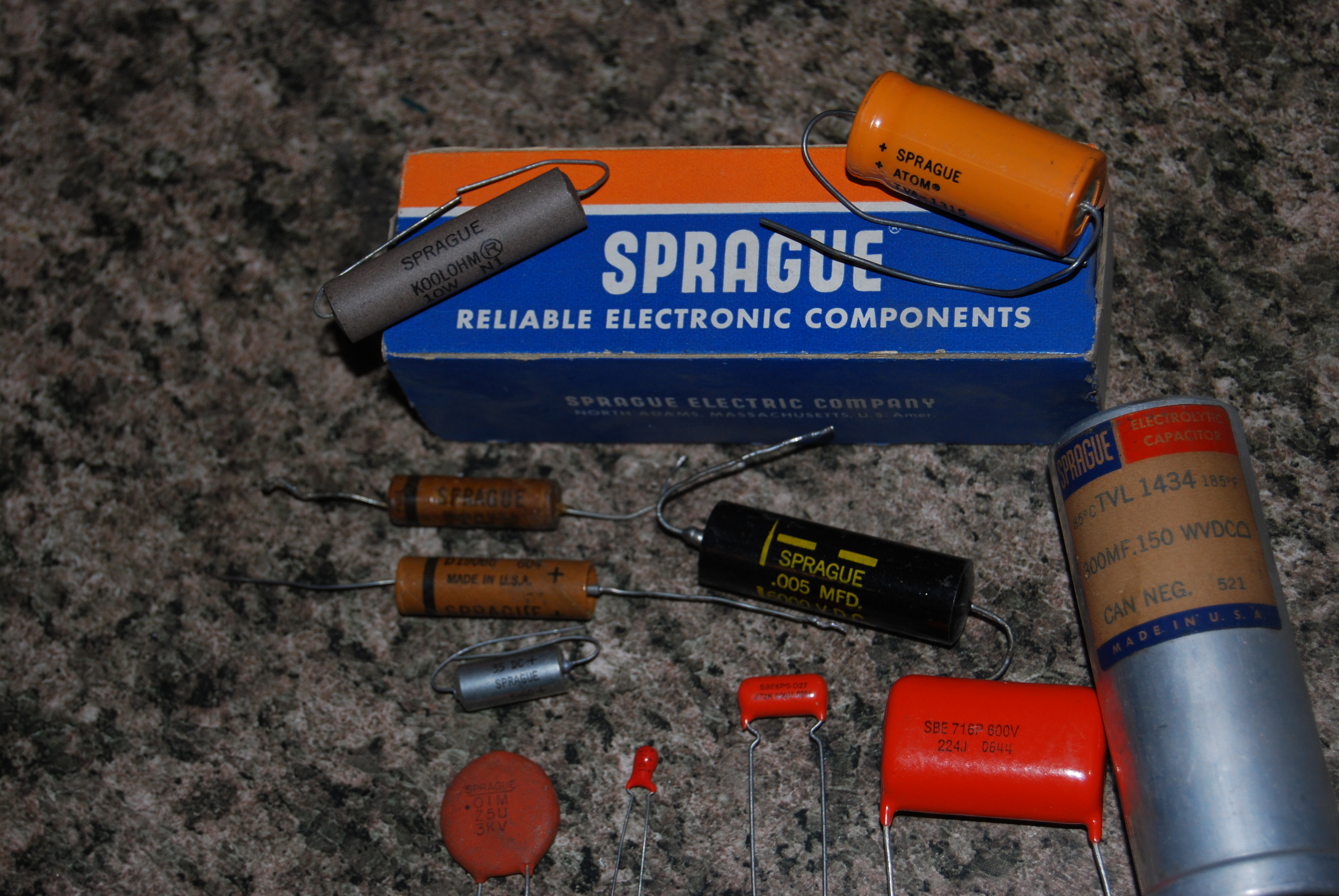
A sample of Sprague capacitors and resistive Components over 60 years

Starting in the early 1950s, Sprague produced its "Black Beauty" line of capacitors. These paper capacitors were similar to Robert Sprague's original patent. Instead of using wax coating on the outer body to keep moisture out (moisture renders capacitors useless), Sprague applied a plastic resin material to encapsulate the device and provide better and longer-lasting resistance to moisture.

In the late 1960s, capacitors developed quickly as better materials, such as mylar, were used in their production. Capacitors became more reliable, smaller, and able to withstand higher voltages. Sprague Electric's "Orange Drop" capacitors were well received by manufacturers and designers. They set the standard for "modern" capacitors in appearance and performance.

The revival of interest in vacuum tube amplifiers brought the mystique of having the right electronic components for top performance. Sprague Electric components had a long history of name recognition, quality, and brand loyalty. The Sprague "Bumble Bee" capacitors that were found in the original Gibson Les Pauls are commonly sought after by guitarists today in search of that original Les Paul tone.

As of 2013, some designers and restorers use only Sprague/Vishay Orange Drops or other Sprague capacitors. After the breakup of Sprague Electric, the Orange Drop Capacitor line was continued by SBE Inc until 2012, when the Orange Drop product line was sold to Cornell Dubilier.

Sprague capacitors were used in a prototype Apple-1 computer.

== See also ==
- Apollo 11 goodwill messages
