= Commonwealth Shoe and Leather Co. =

- U.S. National Register of Historic Places
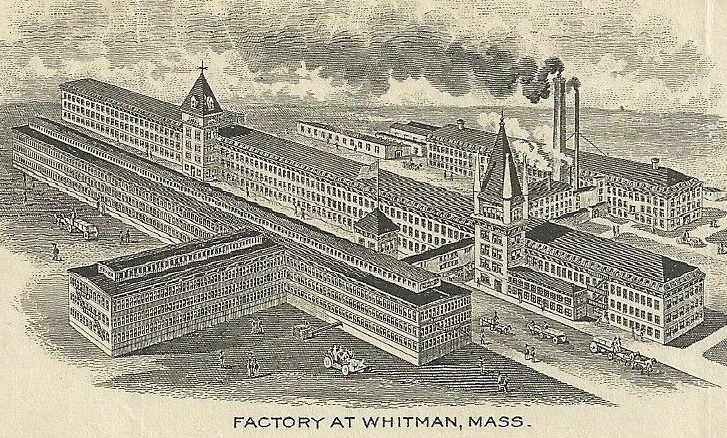
- 1911 engraved depiction of the Whitman factory complex

- Location within Massachusetts Location within the United States
- Location: 7 Marble Street, Whitman, Massachusetts
- Coordinates: 42.080619°N 70.932468°W
- Built: 1870
- NRHP reference No.: 14000271
- Added to NRHP: May 13, 2014

The Commonwealth Shoe and Leather Company is a historic factory complex at 7 Marble Street in Whitman, Massachusetts. The Commonwealth Shoe Company was formed in 1885 by the merger of Charles H. Jones & Co. and Bay State Shoe & Leather Co. The company produced the hugely popular Bostonian shoe, known for its high quality and comfort. The Whitman factory complex was its original site. In 1968, Commonwealth Shoe and Leather merged with Kayser-Roth, which later sold the Bostonian shoe brand to British shoemaker Clarks in 1979. Clarks still produces shoes under the Bostonian brand.

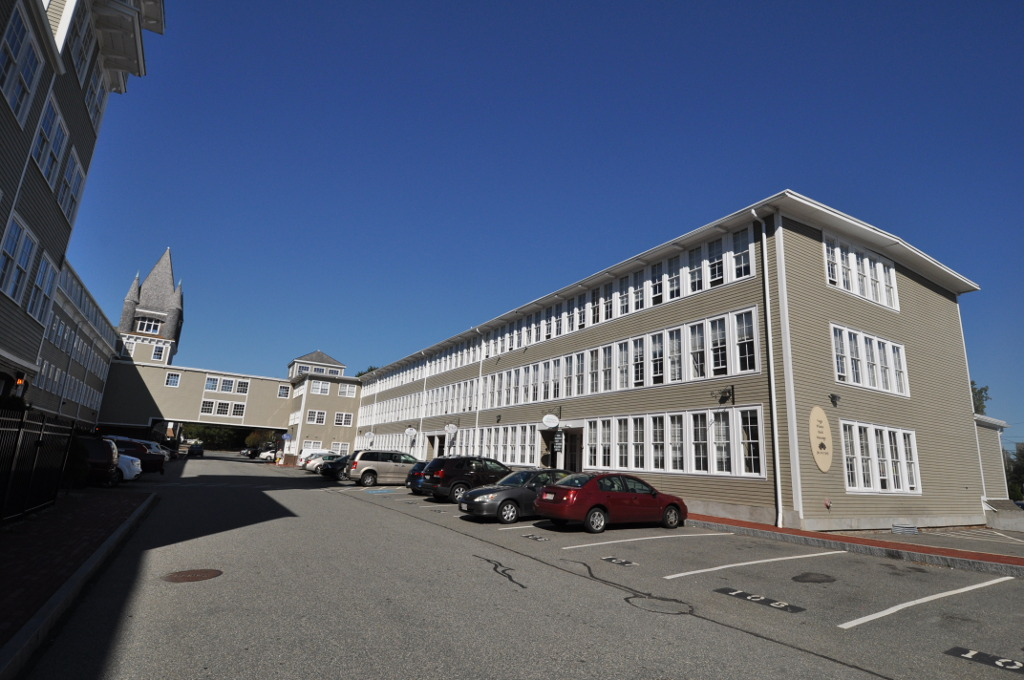
Buildings in 2016

The factory complex was listed on the National Register of Historic Places in 2014.

== See also ==
- National Register of Historic Places listings in Plymouth County, Massachusetts
