= Kayser-Roth =

American underwear manufacturer

Kayser-Roth Corporation
- Type: Subsidiary
- Industry: Legwear, Sleepwear and Leggings
- Predecessor: Julius Kayser & Co. and Chester H. Roth Company
- Founded: 1958; 68 years ago
- Founder: Chester H. Roth; Julius Kayser
- Headquarters: Greensboro, North Carolina, United States
- Area served: North America
- Key people: Gianni Orsini (CEO) and Julia Townsend (President)
- Products: Legwear, Sleepwear and Leggings
- Parent: Golden Lady Company S.p.A.
- Divisions: No Nonsense; Hue; Burlington
- Website: https://www.kayser-roth.com/

Kayser-Roth Corporation (a subsidiary of Golden Lady Company) is an underwear and hosiery manufacturer based in Greensboro, North Carolina. The company currently markets three owned brands in North America: No Nonsense, Hue, and Burlington.

== History ==
Julius Kayser & Co., the predecessor to the modern Kayser-Roth Corporation, was founded in the early 20th century by Julius Kayser and was a manufacturer of hosiery, lingerie and gloves. In 1958, the company purchased the Chester H. Roth Company, forming Kayser-Roth. Alfred P. Slaner, the first head of the merged company, developed Supp-Hose hosiery.

In 1962, Kayser-Roth acquired Interwoven hosiery company, continuing to use the Interwoven brand, until it was merged with Esquire brand in 1971 to Interwoven-Esquire.

In 1968, a merger with Penn Central Transportation Company was explored, however terms could not be agreed on. Kayser-Roth merged with the Commonwealth Shoe and Leather Co. that same year, acquiring the Bostonian shoe brand.

In 1973, in order to compete with the L'eggs brand (currently owned by HanesBrands), Kayser-Roth launched No Nonsense, which was one of the first brands of hosiery to be sold in supermarkets, drugstores and discount department stores. In 1975, Kayser-Roth was purchased by conglomerate Gulf+Western Industries.

In the years under Gulf+Western's ownership, improvements were made to Canadian manufacturing plants, most notably in Ontario and Quebec. Forays into diverse markets such as the automotive industry were carried out. During the late-1970s and early-1980s almost every GM automobile produced had Kayser-Roth components on board.

In 1984, Kayser-Roth acquired the women's underwear division of Calvin Klein Industries and the use of the designer's name for that business.

In 1985, Gulf+Western began divesting all of its non-entertainment enterprises, with Kayser-Roth being sold to the Wickes Companies. In 1993, the Mexican hosiery manufacturer Grupo Synkro purchased the company for approximately $230 million.

In 1999, Italian Golden Lady, the largest hosiery manufacturer in Europe, acquired Kayser-Roth Corporation from Grupo Synkro and reorganized the company. During the 2000s, the No Nonsense brand expanded to include bras, panties, sleepwear, socks for women and men, and foot comfort products.

In April 2011, Kayser-Roth partnered to become an exclusive distributor of socks and hosiery for Jockey International.
