= Massimo Battaini =

Italian business executive

- Battaini in 2026
- Born: August 1, 1961 (age 65); Varese, Italy
- Occupations: CEO, Prysmian

Massimo Battaini (born August 1, 1961) is an Italian business executive and the chief executive officer of Prysmian, an Italian multinational manufacturer in the energy and telecom cables and systems industry. Since his appointment in April 2024, he has overseen the Group's strategic expansion in North America, including the acquisition of Encore Wire. He previously served as the company's chief operating officer and CEO of its North American division.

== Early life and education ==
Born in Varese, Italy, Massimo Battaini graduated in Mechanical Engineering from the Polytechnic University of Milan in 1986. His research in robotics was recognized from the SIRI (Società Italiana di Robotica e Automazione), the Italian Association of Robotics and Automation, in 1987. He later earned an MBA from the SDA Bocconi School of Management in 1989, graduating with honors (cum laude).

== Career ==
=== Academic research and early career ===
Massimo Battaini began his career in 1986 at the Robotics Department of the Polytechnic University of Milan, focusing on robotics control algorithms and technical documentation for dynamic robotics control.

=== Management roles at Pirelli ===
In 1987, he joined Pirelli, initially working on prototype testing for Pirelli Pneumatici. Between 1990 and 1994, he served as Director of the Mould Department and Director of Process Development. In 1994, he relocated to the United States as Plant Manager for Pirelli Armstrong Tyre Co. in California. Returning to strategic roles in 1996, he was appointed Director of Investment and Development for Pirelli Pneumatici and later Business Development Director for Pirelli & C. From 2002 to 2005, as Operations Director for Pirelli Cavi Sistemi Energia and Telecom, he managed global industrial activities across 72 manufacturing plants and a workforce of approximately 11,800 employees.

=== Executive leadership at Prysmian ===
Following the spin-off of Pirelli's cable division in 2005, Massimo Battaini was appointed CEO of Prysmian UK. He returned to Milan in 2011 as Group Chief Operating Officer and joined the Board of Directors in 2014 as Senior Vice President for Energy Projects Manager. From 2018 to 2021, he served as CEO of Prysmian North America, overseeing the region's industrial integration before returning to the role of Group Chief Operating Officer. On 18 April 2024, the Shareholders' Meeting elected him Group Chief Executive Officer.

=== North American expansion and M&A ===
Upon his appointment as CEO, he executed a series of multi-billion-dollar acquisitions focused on the North American market and digital infrastructure. Early transactions under his direction included the acquisition of Warren & Brown, an Australian telecommunication network connectivity products manufacturer serving the FTTA, FTTH, and data center sectors. The company was founded in 1921 and is based in Melbourne, operating two production sites in Australia (Melbourne) and one in the Philippines (Manila). Through this acquisition, Massimo Battaini integrated Warren & Brown's product line into Prysmian's Asia-Pacific telecommunications operations.

In 2024, he led the $4.2 billion acquisition of Encore Wire, a Texas-based manufacturer, to expand the group's presence in the U.S. electrical construction sector. His oversight of the group's expansion also led to the awarding of the €0.5 billion Peninsula-Baleares 2 project in late 2024, reflecting his strategy of prioritizing large-scale infrastructure to support the energy transition. This was followed in 2025 by the acquisition of Channell Commercial Corporation, a California-based connectivity provider, for a total consideration exceeding $1.1 billion. The transaction marked the group's entry into specialized hardware for data centers and 5G networks.

The following year, he led the acquisition of ACSM, a Spanish subsea cable installation company specializing in surveying, route planning, and seabed preparation.

Later in 2026, he oversaw the acquisition of U.S. infrastructure manufacturer Atkore for approximately $3.8 billion, expanding the Prysmian's product line into cable-adjacent systems for electrification and artificial intelligence-driven infrastructure. During same year, he signed a long-term data center optical cable agreement with Molex valued at up to €5.5 billion and initiated a program to double its fiber manufacturing capacity in the United States.

=== Industrial integration ===
In January 2025, he presented a "local-for-local" manufacturing strategy to produce cables and components within regional markets to mitigate tariff exposure and secure supply chains for critical infrastructure. Under his direction, Prysmian's development focused on linking energy and telecommunications infrastructure, including hollow-core fiber for data transmission, and subsea cables equipped with monitoring sensors for offshore energy systems. He also focused on cross-continental infrastructure, leading to the Elmed Project, a submarine interconnection between Italy and Tunisia. The initiative utilizes the Prysmian Monna Lisa vessel for installations at 800-meter depths to strengthen energy security between Europe and Africa. He also oversaw the group's selection as preferred bidder for the Eastern Green Link 4 in September 2025. The contract, linking Scotland and England, extended his strategy of developing the Eastern Green Link corridor and modernizing United Kingdom's energy infrastructure through large-scale subsea interconnections. Furthermore, in early 2026, he partnered with Fincantieri to acquire Xtera, a specialist in optical repeaters, to integrate submarine transmission technologies serving the infrastructure demands of artificial intelligence networks.

== Awards ==
- At the GEO Awards 2024, Massimo Battaini was recognized by the Global Equity Organization for the "Best Use of Employee Share Plans" regarding the "BE IN" initiative. The award followed his implementation of a governance model aimed at reaching 50% employee share ownership by 2027.
- Under Massimo Battaini's mandate, Prysmian was presented with the "2025 Transatlantic Award" by the American Chamber of Commerce in Italy (AmCham Italy). The award was granted in recognition of a €245 million investment to expand production capacity at the Encore Wire facility in Texas.
- In February 2025, he was included in the "100% Business People in Italy" list by Business People. The recognition cited his role in implementing Prysmian's new organizational structure and overseeing the group's industrial consolidation in the North American market.
- Technological fleet modernization under his direction resulted in the vessel Prysmian Monna Lisa earning the "Ship of the Year 2025" award for its 3,000-meter deep-water installation capacity.

== See also ==
- Prysmian
- Electrical cable
- Submarine communications cable
- Energy transition
