= Vishay Intertechnology =

American semiconductor manufacturer

Vishay Intertechnology, Inc.
- Type: Public
- Traded as: NYSE: VSH; S&P 600 component
- Industry: electronics
- Founded: 1962; 64 years ago
- Founder: Felix Zandman
- Headquarters: Malvern, Pennsylvania, U.S.
- Key people: Marc Zandman, Executive Chairman, Chief Business Development Officer, Joel Smejkal, President and CEO
- Products: rectifiers, diodes, MOSFETs, optoelectronics, selected integrated circuits, resistors, capacitors, inductors
- Revenue: ▼US$2.94 billion (2024)
- Operating income: ▼US$5.63 million (2024)
- Net income: ▼US$−31 million (2024)
- Total assets: ▼US$4.11 billion (2024)
- Total equity: ▼US$2.03 billion (2024)
- Number of employees: 22,700 (2024)
- Website: vishay.com

Vishay Intertechnology, Inc. is an American manufacturer of discrete semiconductors and passive electronic components founded by Polish-born businessman Felix Zandman. Vishay has manufacturing plants in Israel, Asia, Europe, and the Americas where it produces rectifiers, diodes, MOSFETs, optoelectronics, selected integrated circuits, resistors, capacitors, and inductors. Vishay Intertechnology revenues for 2024 were $2.9 billion. At the end of 2024, Vishay had approximately 22,700 full-time employees.

Vishay is one of the world's foremost manufacturers of power MOSFETs. They have a wide range of power electronic applications, including portable information appliances, internet communications infrastructure, power integrated circuits, cell phones, and notebook computers.

== History ==
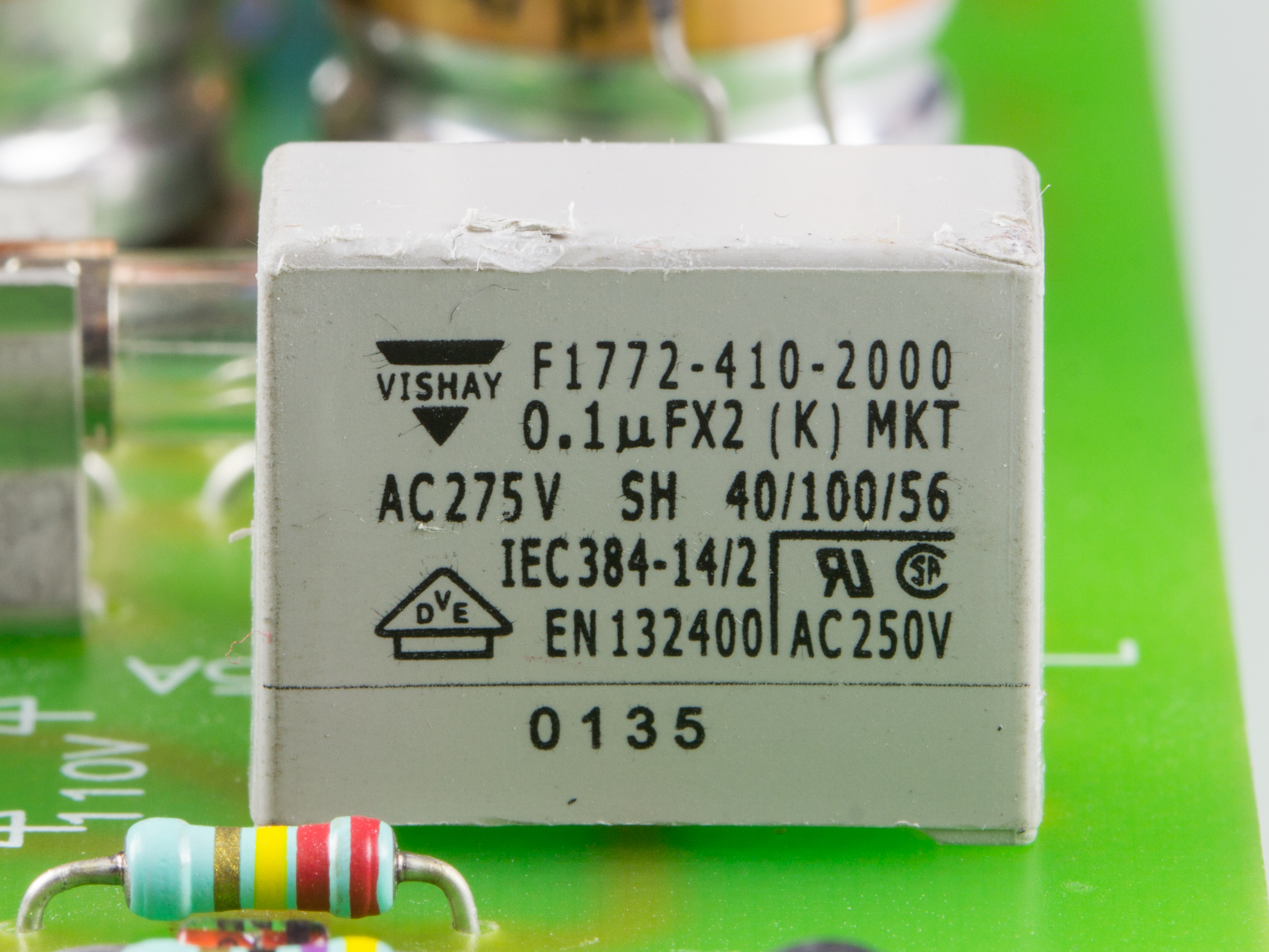
Film capacitor by Vishay

Vishay Intertechnology was founded in 1962 by Polish-born Holocaust survivor Felix Zandman. The company was named after Veisiejai, Zandman's ancestral village in present-day Lithuania. It began operations with a patented technology that had two product lines: foil resistors and foil resistance strain gauges. In 1985, having grown from a start-up into the world's leading manufacturer of these original products, the company began an ongoing series of acquisitions to become a broadline manufacturer of electronics components.

Having expanded into so many product lines, Vishay announced in October 2009 that it would be creating a spin-off company which focuses on its high-precision technologies in Foil Technology. Vishay Precision Group represents approximately 9% of Vishay's annual revenue, and included its product lines in Bulk Metal Foil Resistors, micro-measurements, load cells, process weighing, and on-board weighing. In July 2010, Vishay Intertechnology completed the spin-off of Vishay Precision Group (VPG).

Since 1985, Vishay has pursued a business strategy that principally consists of the following elements: expanding within the electronic components industry, primarily through the acquisition of other manufacturers of electronic components; reducing expenses; transferring manufacturing operations to countries with lower labor costs and government-sponsored incentives; maintaining significant production facilities in regions where Vishay markets the bulk of its products; continually rolling out new products; and strengthening relationships with customers and strategic partners. As a result of this strategy, Vishay has grown from a small manufacturer of precision resistors and resistance strain gauges to one of the world's largest manufacturers and suppliers of a broad line of electronic components.

The former Spectrol Reliance factory in Swindon, England, (UK arm of Spectrol Electronics that was acquired by Vishay in 2000, originally known as Reliance Controls) was the last design by Team 4 (Su Brumwell, Wendy Cheesman, Richard Rogers, and Norman Foster), and is considered the first example of High-tech architecture in the United Kingdom. It opened in 1967 and was demolished in 1991, Spectrol Reliance moving to a different part of Swindon.

== Acquisitions ==
Manufacturers that Vishay has acquired include:

- in 1985: Dale Electronics;
- in 1987: Draloric Electronic;
- in 1988: Sfernice;
- in 1992: Sprague Electric;
- in 1993: Roederstein;
- in 1994: Vitramon;
- in 1998: Siliconix and Telefunken;
- in 2000: Electro-Films, Cera-Mite, and Spectrol;
- in 2001: the infrared components business of Infineon, General Semiconductor, Tansitor, and North American Capacitor Company (Mallory);
- in 2002: BCcomponents (Beyschlag Centralab components, previously part of Philips Electronics Components);
- in 2007: the Power Control Systems business of International Rectifier;
- in 2008: the wet tantalum capacitor business of KEMET;
- in 2011: the resistor businesses of Huntington Electric; and
- in 2012: HiRel Systems.

Vishay agreed to purchase the Inmos microprocessor factory from Nexperia for $177 million in November 2023. In March 2024, the UK government approved the acquisition, as announced by Secretary of State Oliver Dowden.

== See also ==
- Robert C. Sprague 1900-1991 - founder of Sprague Electric company
