= Chester H. Roth =

American businessman

- Born: April 13, 1902; New York City
- Died: July 26, 1977 (aged 75); Manhattan, New York City
- Known for: Founder of Chester H. Roth Company (later Kayser-Roth)
- Spouse(s): Janet Roth (predeceased); Yvonne Roth

Chester H. Roth (April 13, 1902 – July 26, 1977) was an American businessman who founded the Chester H. Roth Company and served as president and CEO of its successor Kayser-Roth Corporation.

== Biography ==
Roth was raised in a Jewish family in New York City where he attended the New York Textile School. As a youth, he worked at the General Merchandise Exchange, a clothing distributor, where In 1925, he started The Chester H. Roth Company, a hosiery manufacturer. In 1958, he merged his company with the Julius Kayser Company which began as a manufacturer of silk gloves and later expanded into lingerie, swimwear and hosiery. The new entity, the Kayser-Roth Corporation had sales of $56 million and by the time that Roth sold the company to Gulf & Western in 1975, sales had grown to $505 million. After the purchase, Roth remained on as chairman and CEO of Kayser-Roth and served as a director at Gulf & Western. In 1993, Kayser-Roth was sold to Mexican hosiery manufacturer Grupo Synkro for US$230,000,000.

He served on the Board of Overseers of the Albert Einstein College of Medicine, as chairman of the executive committee of the New York Anti-Defamation League Appeal, as a director of the North Carolina Textile Foundation, and as an honorary member of the New York Academy of Science.

Roth was married to Janet Falk Roth (preceded him in death); they had three children, David J. Roth, Andrea Roth, and Lynn Roth Cott. He married again to Yvonne Russell-Farrow. Roth died at the Hotel Pierre in Manhattan; services were held at Temple Emanu-El in Manhattan.
