= Robert C. Sprague =

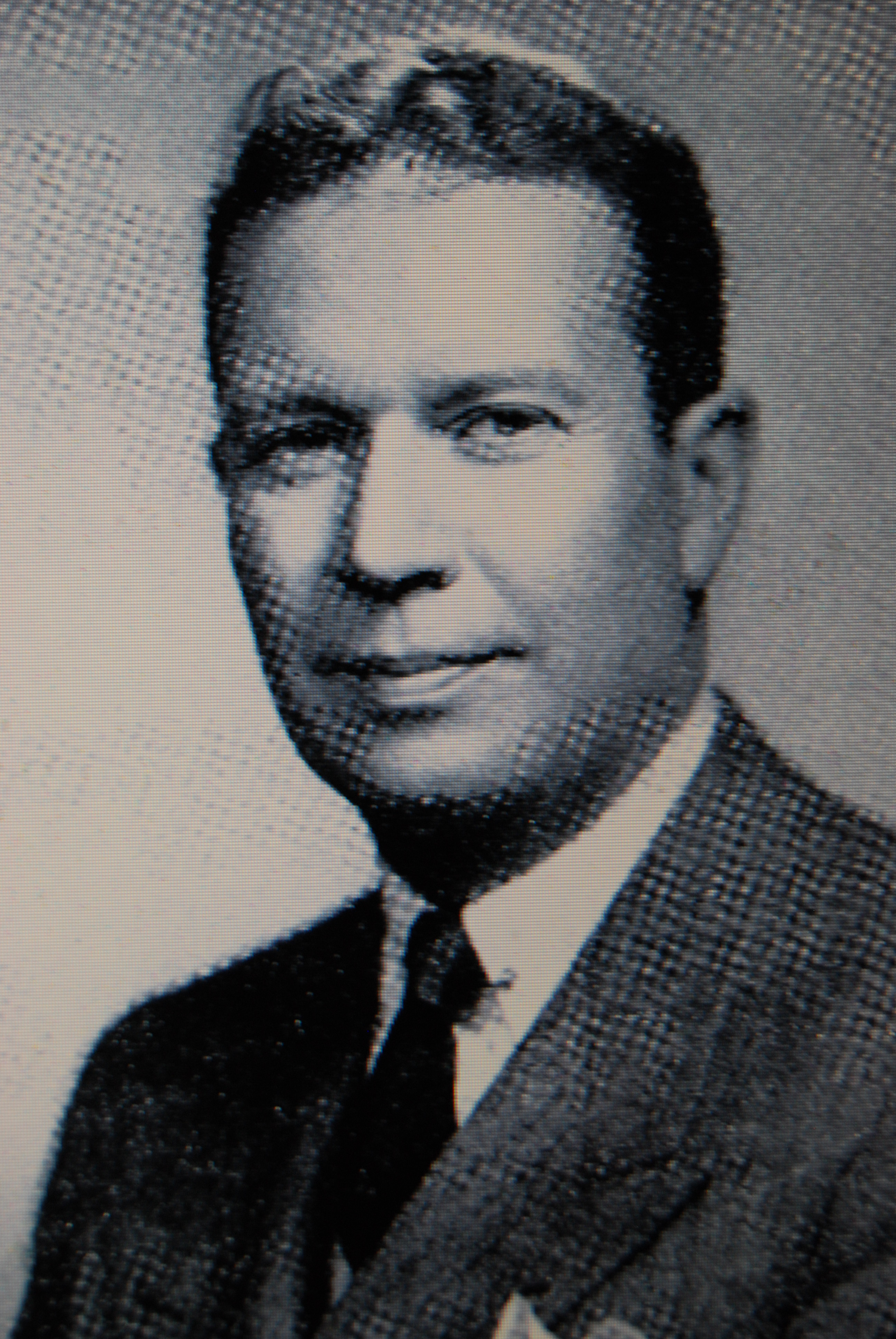
- Sprague in 1952
- Born: August 2, 1900; New York City, New York
- Died: September 27, 1991 (aged 91); Williamstown, Massachusetts
- Occupations: Engineer and businessman
- Known for: Founder of Sprague Electric, manufacturer of capacitors

Robert C. Sprague (August 2, 1900 – September 27, 1991) was an inventor and business executive. He founded Sprague Electric, originally Sprague Specialties Company, Quincy, Massachusetts in 1926, and served as president from 1926-1953 and chief executive from 1953-1971. He invented the tone control for radio and the paper capacitor that launched his business.

Sprague was appointed by President Dwight D. Eisenhower to serve as Undersecretary to the Air Force in 1953. He first accepted, then declined the position, due to financial difficulties.

== Education and early career ==
Sprague was the son of Frank J. Sprague and Harriet Sprague.

After graduating from The Hotchkiss School in 1918, Robert Sprague went to the United States Naval Academy in Annapolis like his father Frank, who was a business associate to Thomas Alva Edison. He later attended the Naval Postgraduate School and completed his graduate program at the Massachusetts Institute of Technology (MIT).

While a naval officer, he invented the tone control for amplifiers and radio sets. In 1921 he married Florence Antoinette van Zelm. They were married until her death in 1987. Sprague patented the paper condenser (capacitor) and tone control in 1926, and this provided the capital to start a business.

== Sprague Electric ==
Sprague founded Sprague Specialties Company in 1926 in Quincy, Massachusetts. In 1930, it moved to North Adams. Sprague was an electronic component maker best known for making a large line of capacitors used in a wide variety of electrical and electronic in commercial, industrial and military/space applications. Other products include resistive components, magnetic components (transformers and coils), filter assemblies, semiconductors and integrated circuits. The company was renamed Sprague Electric in 1942.

Sprague had two brothers, Frank Desmond, and Julian Sprague, who assisted in company operations.

== Family and philanthropy ==
During his business life, Robert Sprague served on the board for the following organizations and businesses:

- Massachusetts Institute of Technology
- MITRE Corporation
- First National Bank of Boston
- Charles Stark Draper Laboratory
- Associated Industries of Massachusetts
- Massachusetts Science and Technology Foundation
- Federal Reserve Bank of Boston

Other Notable Awards, Memberships and Appointments

- Member Institute of Electrical and Electronics Engineers (IEEE)
- American Academy of Arts and Sciences
- War Production Board for the Advisory Committee on Capacitors (1942-1945)
- Appointed by President Eisenhower as Undersecretary to the Air Force in 1953
- Appointed by President Eisenhower to the Security Resources Board- Office of Defense Mobilization in 1957
- Elected to the National Academy of Engineering 1985
- Holder of 19 patents

Robert C. Sprague was the driving force behind the annual Williamstown Theatre Festival. Aside from business and family, theater arts was his greatest love. In the 1940s he (as Sprague Electric) sponsored a symphony orchestra which later became the Berkshire Symphony Orchestra at Williams College.

His favorite sport was skiing. He was the author of two books ("Sprague Electric" of North Adams: a pioneer in electronics in New England, Newcomen Publishing (1958) and Parallel Skiing for Weekend Skiers, self-published (1970). Robert and his wife Florence Antoinette van Zelm had two children, Robert C. Sprague Jr and (Dr.) John L. Sprague. John L. Sprague was head of Sprague Electric from 1981 until its closing in 1993. Robert C. Sprague died at home in Williamstown, Mass on September 27, 1991.
