= General Cable =

US manufacturing company

General Cable Corporation
- Company type: Private
- Industry: Electrical cable; manufacturing; engineering
- Founded: Incorporated 1927
- Headquarters: Highland Heights, Kentucky
- Key people: Michael T. McDonnell (CEO); John E. Welsh, III (Nonexecutive Chairman)
- Products: Power; telecommunications; fiber optics; electronics; datacom cables
- Revenue: $6 billion (2014)
- Number of employees: 8,500 (2017)
- Parent: Prysmian Group
- Website: www.generalcable.com

General Cable was an American multinational cable manufacturing company based in Highland Heights, Kentucky, with sales offices and manufacturing facilities in several countries. General Cable manufactured and distributed copper, aluminum, and optical fiber cables. In December 2017, Italian group Prysmian acquired General Cable for a $3 billion deal finalized on June 6, 2018.

== History ==
General Cable was founded in New Jersey in 1927, merging several older companies founded in the 19th century, including Phillips Wire and Safety Cable Company, Rome Wire Company, and Standard Underground Cable. General Cable was owned by Penn Central from 1981 to 1992.

== Products ==
General Cable manufactures copper and aluminum wire, optical fiber, and electrical cable products. Low-voltage, medium-voltage, and high-voltage power distribution and power transmission devices are among the company's power cables. Several brands are used by General Cable to market its products.

== Corporate information ==
=== Logo ===
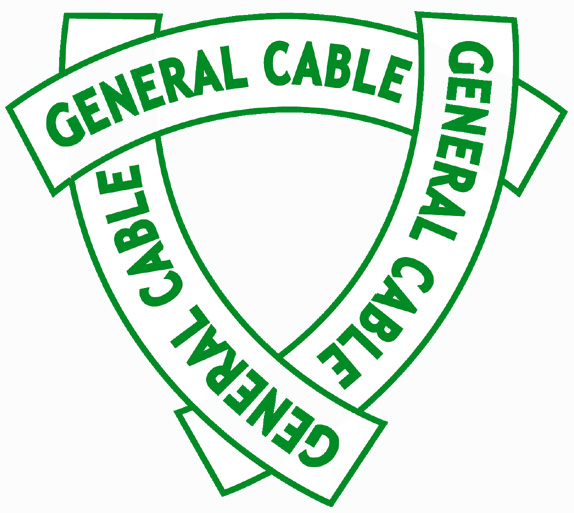
General Cable's 1927 logo, representing three lengths of cable overlaid on one another

When General Cable officially formed in 1927, the company introduced its first trademark logo.

Since the original 1927 version, the company's logo has been modified five times. Today, the trademarked logo consists of the "General Cable" stylized black text with a green "Reuleaux triangle" on the left, which is a modernized version of the 1927 symbol.

=== Locations ===
General Cable's global headquarters, located in Highland Heights, Kentucky

General Cable's global headquarters is located in Highland Heights, Kentucky. This facility, which also serves as the North American headquarters and employs approximately 400 associates, has been operating since 1992.

General Cable operates internationally, with regional business operations in North America, Latin America, and Europe. The company has a network of manufacturing facilities in core markets, with sales representation and distribution worldwide.

=== Employees ===
In 2016, General Cable employed 11,000 associates working in manufacturing plants, distribution centers, technology centers, sales offices, and corporate headquarters for the development, design, manufacture, marketing, and distribution of its products.

In June 2013, General Cable placed 17th among the 40 top midsized (150 to 499 employees) companies in the Greater Cincinnati and Northern Kentucky region.

== Foreign bribery ==
In 2016, the company was ordered to pay over $75 million to resolve both SEC and Department of Justice investigations into violations of the Foreign Corrupt Practices Act (FCPA) for making illicit payments to government officials in Africa and Asia.
