= Grodno Ghetto =

Nazi ghetto in occupied Poland

The Grodno Ghetto
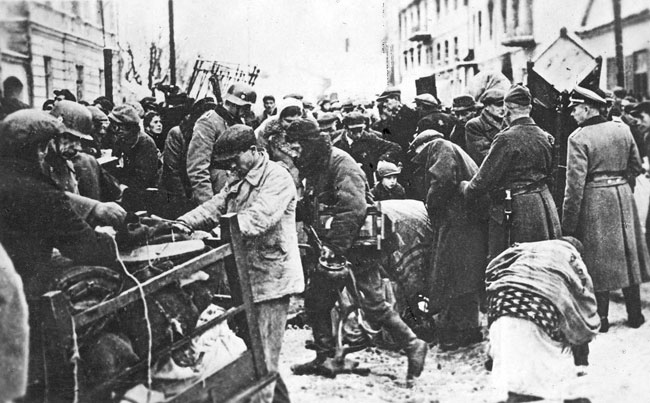
- Jews flooding the gates of Ghetto One during relocation action, November 1941

- Location of Grodno in modern-day Belarus
- Location: Grodno, German-occupied Poland; 53.6790°N 23.8249°E
- Incident type: Imprisonment, slave labor, transit to extermination camp
- Organizations: SS, Order Police battalions, Belarusian Auxiliary Police
- Camp: Treblinka, Auschwitz
- Victims: 25,000 Jews

The Grodno Ghetto (Polish: getto w Grodnie, Belarusian: Гродзенскае гета, Hebrew: גטו גרודנו) was a Nazi ghetto established in November 1941 by Nazi Germany in the German-occupied Poland city of Grodno for the purpose of persecution and exploitation of Jews in Western Belarus.

The ghetto, run by the SS, consisted of two interconnected areas about 2 km apart. Ghetto One was established in the Old Town district, around the synagogue (Shulhoif), with some 15,000 Jews crammed into an area less than half a square kilometre. Ghetto Two was created in the Slobodka suburb, with around 10,000 Jews incarcerated in it. Ghetto Two was larger than the main ghetto but far more ruined. The reason for the split was determined by the concentration of Jews within the city and less need to transfer them from place to place. Their situation had considerably worsened with the ghettos' locations highly inadequate in terms of sanitation, water and electricity. The separation of the ghettos would later enable the Germans to murder the prisoners with greater ease. The larger ghetto was liquidated in 1943, a year-and-a-half after its establishment, and the smaller one, a few months earlier.

== Background ==
Until the Nazi-Soviet invasion of Poland in 1939, Grodno was part of the Białystok Voivodeship of the Second Polish Republic, in Kresy (eastern Poland). Following Molotov–Ribbentrop Pact between Germany and the Soviet Union, the Soviet Union annexed the region to the Belarusian SSR. Grodno was annexed by Germany in 1941 to the Bezirk Bialystok district of East Prussia, following the German invasion of the Soviet Union in Operation Barbarossa.

== Establishment and organization ==
=== Ghetto One ===
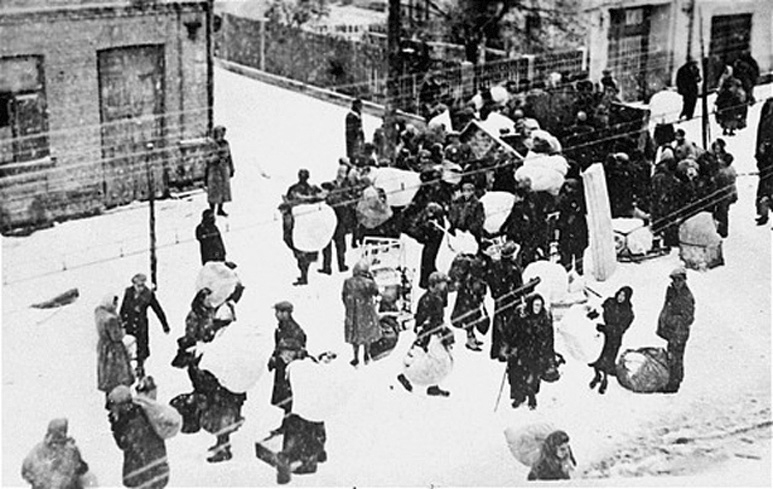
Forced relocation of Jews into Ghetto One, Grodno, November 1941

Twelve days into the German occupation of the city, a number of restrictions and prohibitions were enforced by the new administration. All Jews were ordered to register and the word Jude (Jew) was stamped into their identity cards. They were forbidden to walk on the sidewalks and allowed to walk only on roads in a single file. On 30 June 1941, it became mandatory for all Jews to wear an identifying badge.

Ghetto One was established in the city's centre, close to the New Hrodna Castle and around the synagogue. Jews had already concentrated in that area before the founding of the ghetto, but the space was greatly reduced nonetheless. All 15,000 Jews living nearby were forced into an area less than half a square kilometre, between Wilenska Street on one side, and Zamkowa Street (renamed Burg Strasse) on the other. The ghetto was surrounded by a 2-metre fence. The entrance to the ghetto was on Zamkowa Street between the sidewalk and the road. Some of the houses on that street were demolished. The total area of the ghetto would shrink in time; as the transports of the Jews went on to the transit camp in Kiełbasin, and then on to the death camp in Treblinka. Just before its closure, Ghetto One included only a few buildings on Zamkowa Street.

=== Ghetto Two ===
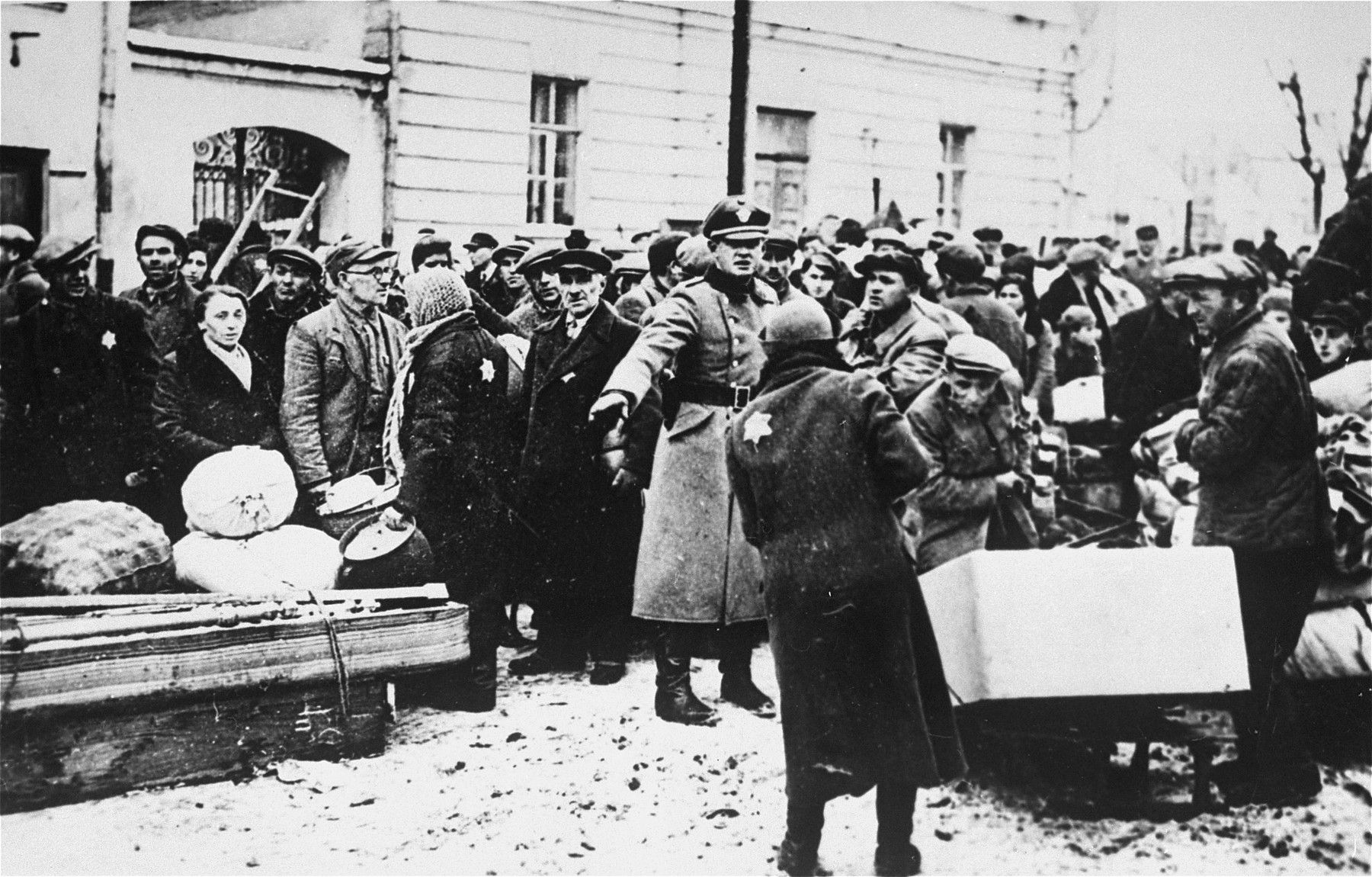
Forced relocation into the ghetto, November 1941

Ghetto Two was created behind the railway tracks in the Słobódka (Slobodka) suburb, next to the old army barracks near the market square. The neighborhood was underdeveloped, with fewer houses and a lot of empty lots. Some 10,000 Jews were herded into this ghetto, larger in size than Ghetto One but far more dilapidated. They were given only six hours to move in without the use of vehicles, resulting in near panic, with thousands of Jews flooding the gates. The ghetto was surrounded by a fence, which ran along Skidel Street. The entrance to the ghetto was from Artyleryjska Street (renamed Kremer Strasse).

In both ghettos, ration cards were introduced in the bakeries. The Jews were allowed to purchase about 200 grams of bread a day for a token payment. The Judenrat was permitted to run a butcher shop with horse meat available from time to time. Potatoes were distributed from the cellar of the Great Synagogue. There were public kitchens in both ghettos serving up to 3,000 meals a day without meat or fat but with a piece of bread (50-100 grams). A separate pot was used for those who wanted kosher food.

== Deportations ==
Mass shootings occurred in Grodno on November 2, 1942. On that very day, both ghettos were cordoned off from the outside. Two weeks later, on November 15, 1942, the initial deportation operation took place at the Slobodka Ghetto. Approximately 4,000 Jewish tradesmen were relocated to Ghetto One, while the remaining prisoners were forced to march to the Sammellager in Kiełbasin for deportation to Auschwitz-Birkenau. The successive liquidation of the ghetto was performed with the participation of Order Police battalions and all available men from Gestapo, SiPo, Kripo, and Schupo, reinforced by units of the Belarusian Auxiliary Police. The first deportation train arrived at Birkenau three days later on 18 November. Before death, some Jews were ordered to sign postcards in German that read "Being treated well, we are working and everything is fine".

One week of daily transports from Grodno Ghetto to Auschwitz, January 1943
Date of arrival	Jews	Selected for work	Exterminated
20 Jan. 1943	2,000	256 (155 men, 101 women)	1,744
21 Jan. 1943	2,000	297 (175 men, 122 women)	1,003
22 Jan. 1943	3,650	594 (365 men, 229 women)	3,056
23 Jan. 1943	2,000	426 (235 men, 191 women)	1,574
24 Jan. 1943	2,000	226 (166 men, 60 women)	1,774
Total	11,650	1,799 (1,096 men, 703 women)	9,851
Source: Danuta Czech, Kalendarium der Ereignisse im Konzentrationslager Auschwitz-Birkenau, Rowohlt, 1989, pp. 336–337, 348, 354.

The next deportation action from Ghetto One to transit camp in Kiełbasin (5 kilometres (3.1 mi) distance) began at the end of November 1942. There were 22,000–28,000 Jews from 22 cities, towns and villages imprisoned there by that time.

In Kiełbasin (now Kolbasino), the Jews were loaded onto the same windowless freight cars and sent to Auschwitz and Treblinka. In early March 1943 the remaining Jews from the ghetto were sent to the Białystok Ghetto (82 km distance). On 13 March 1943 Grodno was declared Judenrein by announcements posted in public. Until November 1943 the inmates from Kiełbasin were either massacred or sent for extermination at Majdanek and Treblinka, soon after the Białystok Ghetto uprising was extinguished in the district. On 14 July 1944 the Red Army liberated Grodno. During the ghetto liquidation, there were a number of Jewish escapes, as well as rescue attempts by local Polish gentiles. Righteous Among the Nations who helped Grodno Ghetto's Jews included the Krzywicki family the Cywińscy family, and the Docha family.

== Postwar ==
Jews, who survived in the forests with the partisans, returned after the war - some 2,000. According to Encyclopedia Judaica: "In the mid-1950s the Jewish cemetery was plowed up. Tombstones were taken away and used for building a monument to Lenin." Memorials were constructed at four Jewish mass graves.

== See also ==
- History of the Jews in Poland
- The Holocaust in Poland
- Pińsk Ghetto in modern-day Belarus
