= Shin Kong Manhattan Building =

High-rise office building in Taiwan

- 新光曼哈頓大樓
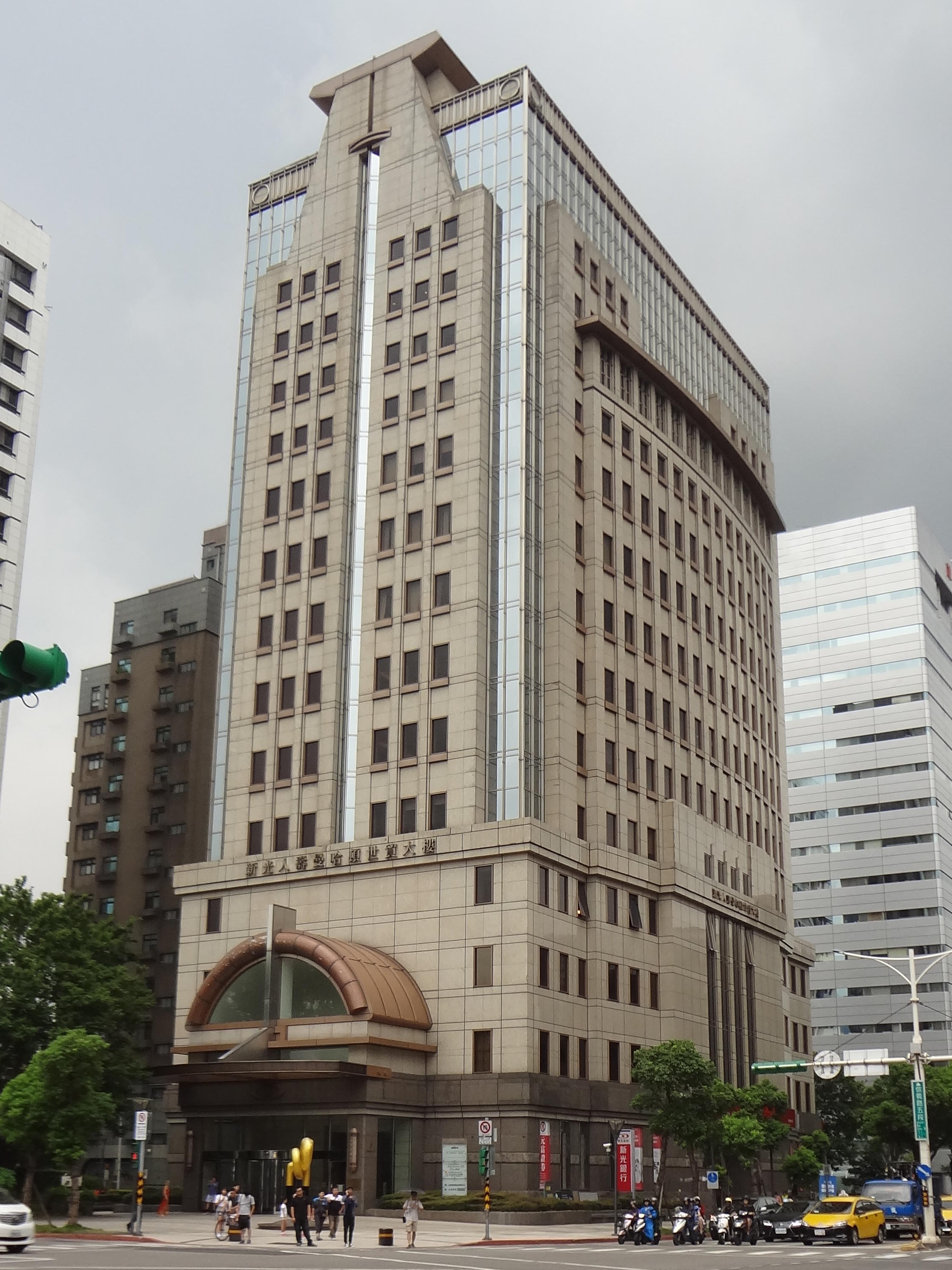
- Interactive map of the Shin Kong Manhattan Building area

General information
- Status: Completed
- Type: Office
- Location: No. 8, Section 5, Xinyi Road, Xinyi District, Taipei, Taiwan
- Coordinates: 25.032892825622564°N 121.56079292639329°E
- Construction started: 1999
- Completed: 2000

Height
- Roof: 72 m (236 ft)

Technical details
- Floor count: 17
- Floor area: 23,208.43 m^{2} (249,813.5 sq ft)

The Shin Kong Manhattan Building (Chinese: 新光人壽曼哈頓世貿大樓) is a 17-story, 72 m (236 ft) high-rise office building completed in 2000 and located in Xinyi Special District, Taipei, Taiwan. Owned by Shin Kong Group, the building has a total floor area of 23,208.43 m^{2} (249,813.5 sq ft).

== See also ==
- Shin Kong Life Tower
- Shin Kong Life Nangang Tower
- Xinyi Special District
- Lè Architecture
- Pxmart Headquarters
