= Shin Kong Life Nangang Tower =

High-rise office building in Taiwan

- 新光南港軟體園區大樓
- Interactive map of the Shin Kong Life Nangang Tower area

General information
- Status: Completed
- Type: Office, Hotel, Retail
- Location: No. 196, Jingmao 2nd Road, Nangang District, Taipei, Taiwan
- Coordinates: 25.060248299934557°N 121.6147537539037°E
- Construction started: 2016
- Completed: 2018

Height
- Roof: 318 ft (97 m)

Technical details
- Floor count: 20
- Floor area: 33,973 m^{2} (365,680 sq ft)

Design and construction
- Architect: Chu-Yuan Lee

The Shin Kong Life Nangang Tower (Chinese: 新光南港軟體園區大樓) is a 20-story, 318 ft (97 m) high-rise office building completed in 2018 and located in Nangang District, Taipei, Taiwan. Designed by the Taiwanese architect Chu-Yuan Lee and owned by Shin Kong Group, the building has a total floor area of 33,973 m^{2} (365,680 sq ft) and six basement levels. The first to ninth floors of the building are office spaces and the 10th to 20th floors house The Place Taipei, a five-star hotel.

== See also ==
- Shin Kong Life Tower
- Shin Kong Manhattan Building
- Lè Architecture
- Pxmart Headquarters
