= 124 Horseferry Road =

Head office of Channel 4 Television

- Channel 4 Headquarters building
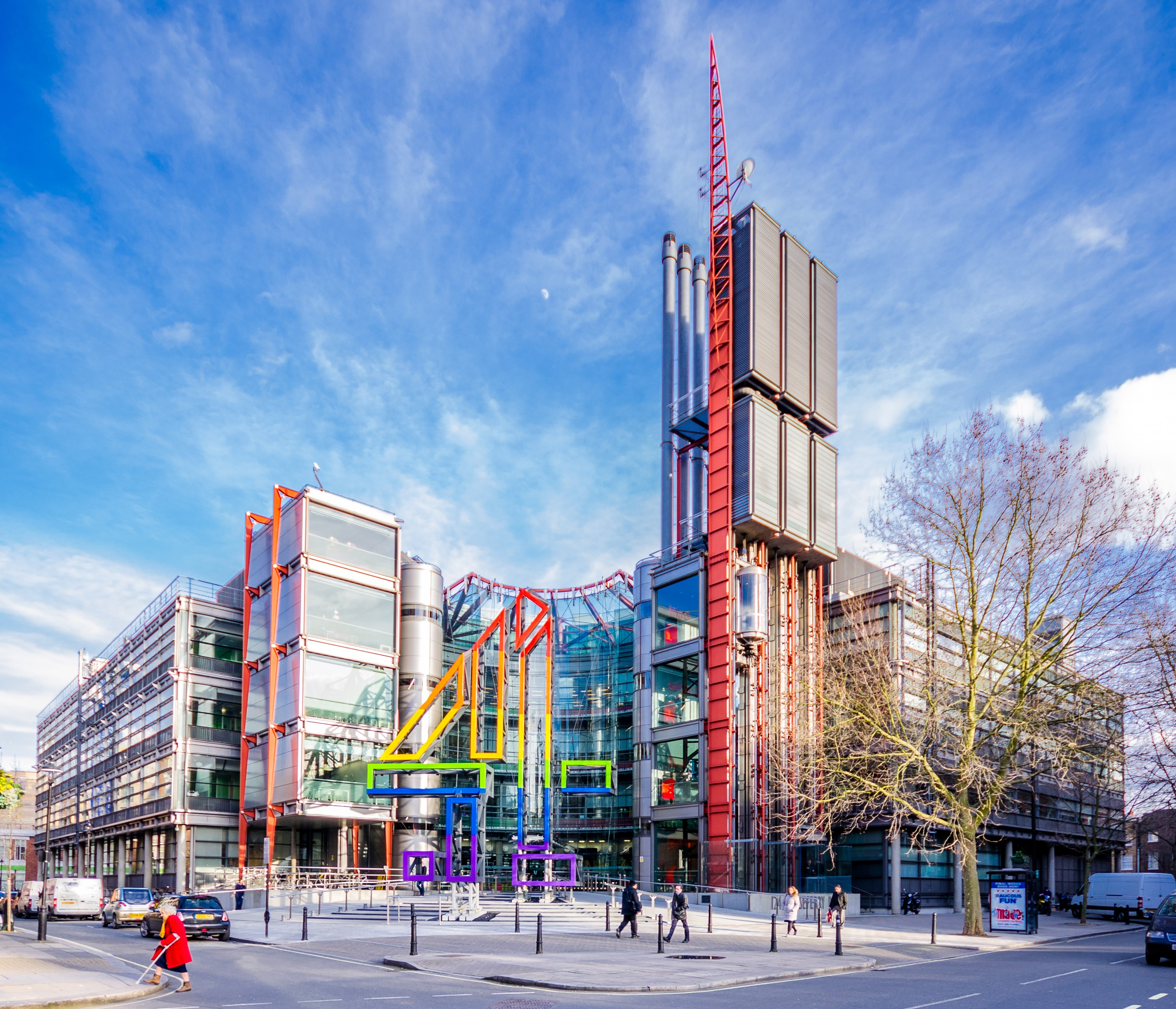
- Channel 4 Headquarters with the Big 4 sculpture in the foreground
- Interactive map of the 124 Horseferry Road area
- Alternative names: Channel 4 building

General information
- Architectural style: High-tech architecture
- Location: City of Westminster, Channel Four Television, 124–126 Horseferry Road, London; SW1P 2TX
- Coordinates: 51°29′45.4″N 0°7′58.6″W
- Construction started: 1990
- Opened: 6 July 1994; 31 years ago
- Cost: £38,500,000
- Owner: Channel Four Television Corporation

Height
- Antenna spire: 43 m (141 ft)
- Roof: 37 m (121 ft)

Technical details
- Floor count: 4
- Floor area: 15,000 m^{2} (160,000 sq ft)

Design and construction
- Architecture firm: Richard Rogers and Partners; Project Architects: Marco Goldschmied and John Young (Project Partners); Mark Darbon (Project Lead); Richard Rogers; Graham Stirk; Mike Davies; Mike Fairbrass; Stephen Light; Avtar Lotay; John Lowe; Andrew Morris; Stephen Spence; Martin White
- Structural engineer: Arup Group
- Quantity surveyor: Davis Langdon & Everest / Mott Green Wall

Listed Building – Grade II
- Official name: 124–126 Horseferry Road
- Designated: 23 March 2023; 3 years ago
- Reference no.: 1479017

124 Horseferry Road is the Grade II listed London headquarters for the British television broadcaster, Channel 4. It is located in the City of Westminster, and includes 100 residential apartments. The building was opened on 6 July 1994 and was designed by Richard Rogers and Partners. In January 2024, Channel 4 announced it would sell the building as part of cost-cutting measures.

== Design and construction ==
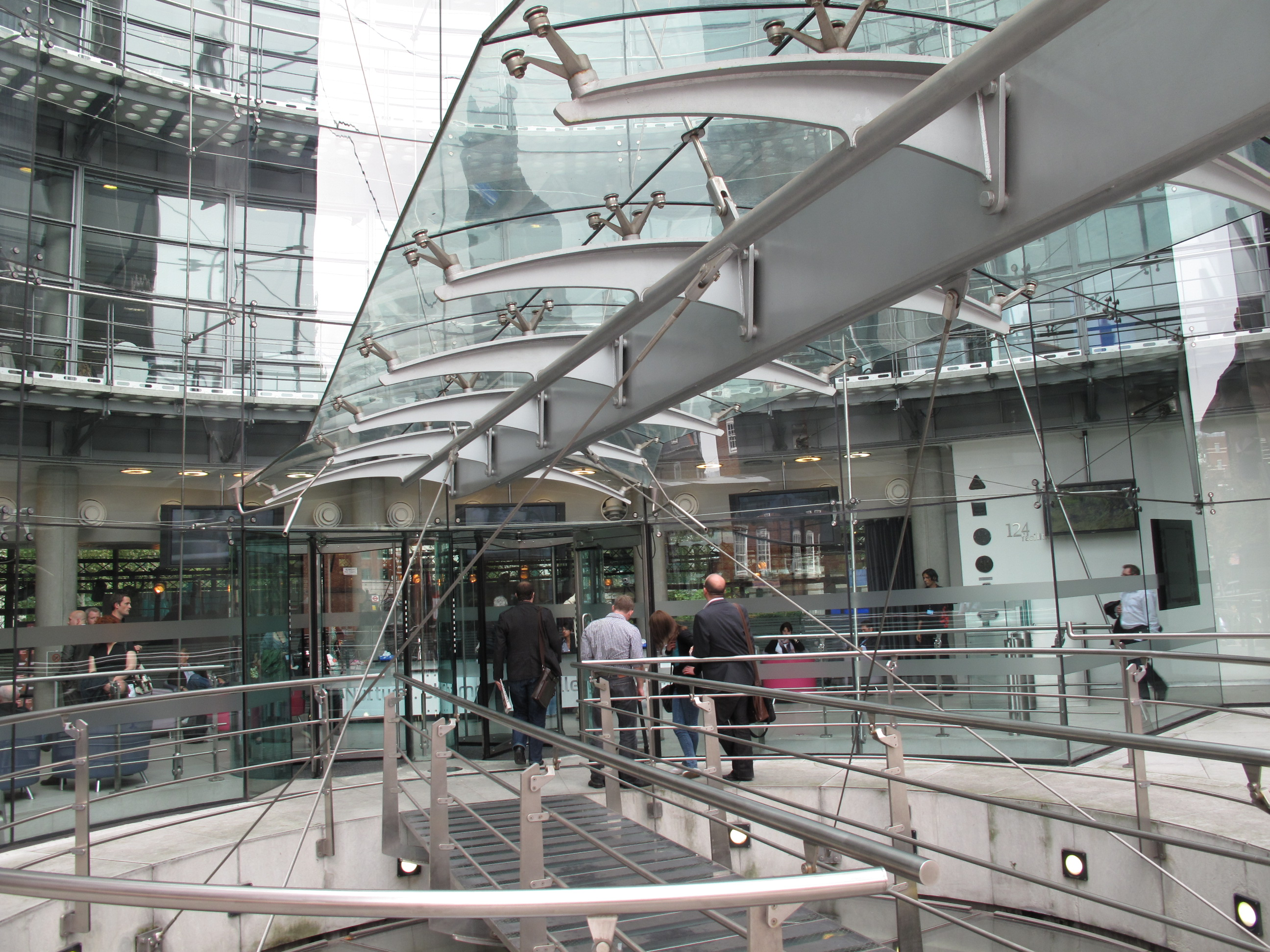
Entrance to the building

After a selection process during the autumn of 1990, Channel 4 invited three architectural firms to take part in a competition to design their 15,000 m^{2} (160,000 sq ft) headquarters building on the south-eastern corner of Chadwick Street and Horseferry Road in a mixed development area of Westminster. The site consisted of an abandoned 10 m (33 ft) deep basement of a proposed 1970s post office building. The architectural brief also incorporated a requirement for a residential development of two blocks of flats including 100 apartments, an underground car park and a small public landscaped park. The three firms chosen were Bennetts Associates, Richard Rogers and Partners and James Stirling.

The Richard Rogers Partnership was chosen from the shortlist. This was the first major building that they had designed since the Lloyd's building (1978–1986). Construction began in 1990 and was completed in 1994. It was built on a design and build basis. The building consists of two four-storey office blocks that are connected to a central entrance block in an L shape. The entrance has a concave glazed wall. The building is finished in grey steel cladding, which is perforated by red-ochre steel struts. John Young, the project architect, said that the colour was "taken from a paint sample provided by the City of San Francisco: it is the same colour as the Golden Gate Bridge".

In 2023, the Twentieth Century Society added the building to its Risk List of architecture at risk of being lost. It was listed at Grade II by Historic England on 23 March 2023.

== See also ==
- Big 4 (sculpture)

== Awards and nominations ==
- 1995 RIBA National Award
- 1995 Royal Fine Art Commission Award
- 1996 BBC Design Awards Finalist
