= European Court of Human Rights building =

Civic building in Strasbourg, France

Coordinates: 48°35′49″N 7°46′29″E

- Interactive map of the European Court of Human Rights building area

General information
- Type: Civic
- Location: Strasbourg, France
- Current tenants: European Court of Human Rights
- Construction started: December 1991
- Completed: December 1994; 31 years ago
- Cost: 544 million francs
- Client: Council of Europe
- Owner: Council of Europe

Technical details
- Floor area: 28,000 sq m

Design and construction
- Architect: Richard Rogers
- Architecture firm: Richard Rogers Partnership and Atelier d'Architecture Claude Bucher
- Structural engineer: Arup / Omnium Technique Européen
- Services engineer: Ove Arup & Partners / Omnium Technique Européen
- Other designers: Acoustic Consultant: Sound Research Laboratories, Landscape Architect: David Jarvis Associates / Dan Kiley, Lighting Consultant: Lighting Design Partnership
- Quantity surveyor: Thorne Wheatley Associates
- Main contractor: Campenon Bernard SGE

The building of the European Court of Human Rights is located in the European Quarter of Strasbourg, France. It was designed by the Richard Rogers Partnership and Claude Buche and was completed in 1994.

The building is located on the eastern corner of the water intersection, where the Ill river is crossed by the Canal de la Marne au Rhin. The court was formerly located in a building located just across the canal, which was built in 1965 and designed by Bertrand Monnet, J. Apriell and Papillard.

== Design ==
The building was designed in 1989 by the Richard Rogers Partnership Ltd (London) and Claude Bucher (Strasbourg). They intended to create a "symbolic landmark but not a monument". They also, due to the nature of the court, wanted to make it more welcoming and open rather than fortress-like. The original design was stretched as, during design, the demand for office space grew by 50% due to the fall of the Eastern Bloc. The building relies on natural light and ventilation, except the light entrance hall which is air conditioned in an energy saving manner. The two main organs of the court, the court and commission, occupy two large circular chambers each side and offices are located in a "tail" stretching behind the building.

The team of architects behind the Rogers Partnership working on the building were: Laurie Abbott, Peter Angrave, Eike Becker, Elliot Boyd, Mike Davies, Karin Egge, Pascale Gibon, Marco Goldschmied, Lennart Grut, Ivan Harbour, Amarjit Kalsi, Sze-King Kan, Carmel Lewin, Avtar Lotay, John Lowe, Louise Palomba, Kim Quaz, Richard Rogers, Pascale Rousseau, Yuli Toh, Sarah Tweedie, Andrew Tyley, Yoshiyuki Uchiyama and John Young.

== Construction ==
Building work began in December 1991 and continued until December 1994. It was built by 50 firms with 125 subcontractors and cost 544 million French Francs, which came from the member states of the Council of Europe which owns the building, however the site it was built on was provided by the City of Strasbourg. Queen Elizabeth II planted a tree on the building site in May 1992.

== Rooms ==
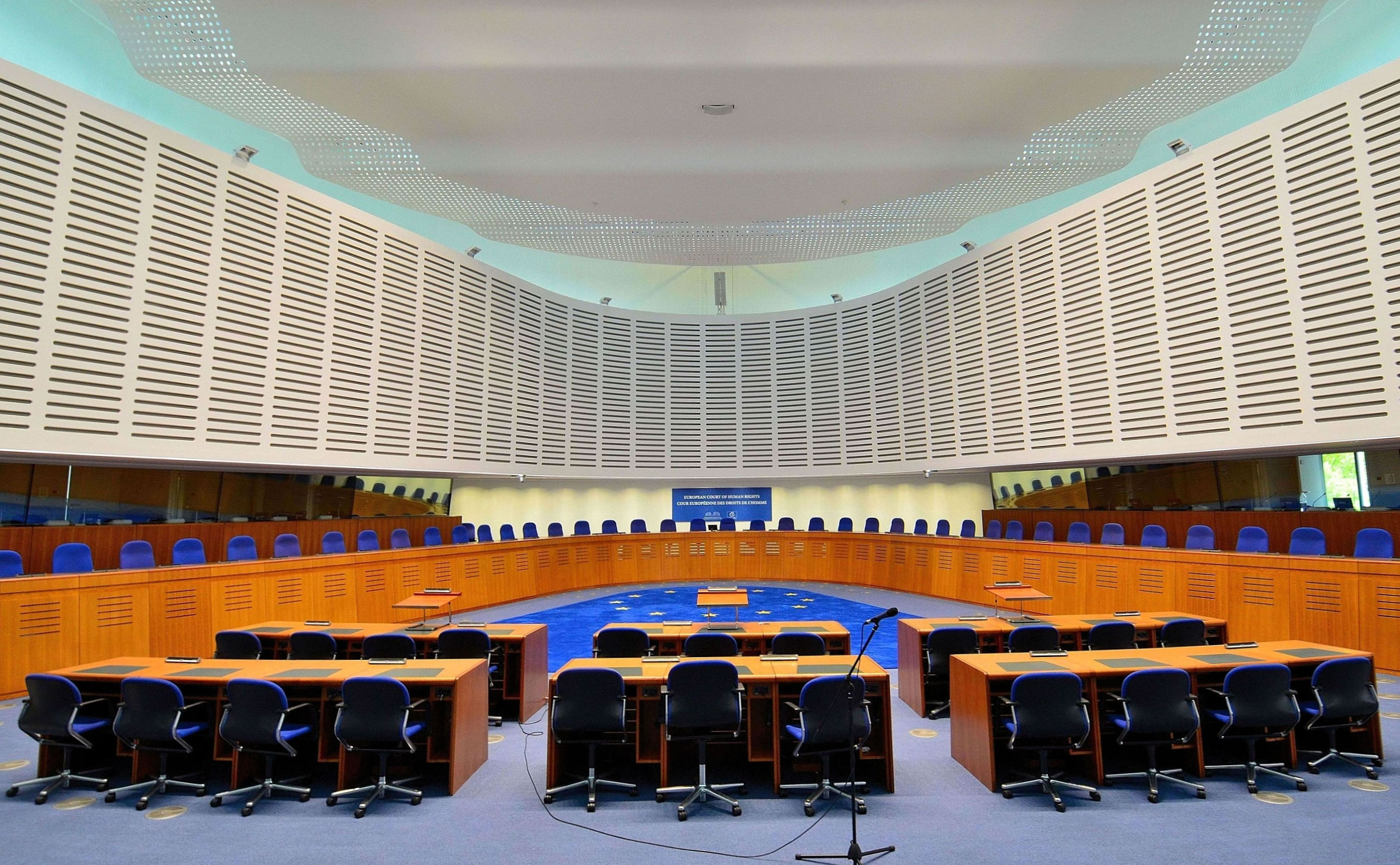
Main court room

The building has 28,000 square metres of floor space. The Court Room covers 860 square metres and has 260 seats, with an extra 49 for judges and 33 for applicants (the deliberation room has 47 places with an additional 52 seats). The Commission Room covered 520 square metres and has 41 seats with 30 places for applicants. Other meeting rooms (in total there are 11) cover 4500 square metres and have an average of 47 places around table, plus 52 at the rear. The 420 offices cover 16,500 square metres and in total the building has capacity for 600 people. There is also a Projection room with 204 seats and a 180-seat cafeteria.

== See also ==
- European Institutions in Strasbourg
- Palace of Europe
- Seat of the European Parliament in Strasbourg
