= Aedas =

Hong Kong international architectural firm

- Type: Limited liability company
- Industry: Architecture
- Founded: 2002; 24 years ago
- Headquarters: Hong Kong
- Area served: International
- Key people: Keith Griffiths (chairman)
- Services: Architecture, Landscape; Interior design; Urban Design; masterplanning; Graphic design
- Website: www.aedas.com

Aedas is an architectural firm founded by the Welsh architect Keith Griffiths. Aedas employs 1,000 staff in its twelve offices in Hong Kong, Beijing, Shanghai, Shenzhen, Singapore, Dubai, Riyadh, Delhi and Seattle and provides services in architecture, interior design, urban design, masterplanning and graphic design. It was established in 2002.

== History ==
=== Establishment ===
Aedas was established in 2002 and opened its first China office in the same year.

Aedas was appointed to design Fortune Plaza 1 (2003). Other mixed-commercial projects in Beijing include, R&F City, R&F Plaza and R&F Centre in Beijing. The company set up offices in Macau (2004), Shanghai (2005) and Chengdu (2005).

Aedas Singapore was appointed to design various rail works of Jurong East Integrated Transport Hub and MRT stations. Also, Aedas completed mixed-use and residential projects including The Star, Shaw Tower and Woodlands North Coast.

In Macau, Aedas delivered its first integrated casino resort project, Sands Macau in 2004. Aedas was commissioned as lead architect for The Venetian Macao (2007).

The company was commissioned to design Dubai Metro (2004). The Dubai office was established in 2005 and the Abu Dhabi office was set up in 2007. In 2010 and 2011, Ocean Heights, Boulevard Plaza and Ubora Towers, in Dubai, were completed.

Aedas continues to expand its presence in the Middle East with plans to establish offices in Riyadh, Saudi Arabia, to seize emerging opportunities in the region. The company is planning to open an office in Cairo to support the delivery of a large-scale masterplan project in Egypt.

== Notable projects ==
- Hong Kong West Kowloon Station, Hong Kong
- Hong Kong–Zhuhai–Macau Bridge Hong Kong Boundary Crossing Facilities (HKBCF) Passenger Clearance Building
- SAS iTower, the largest skyscraper in the world by floor area
- Terminal 2 & Terminal 2 Expansion
- Hong Kong International Airport Midfield Concourse
- Chongqing Gaoke Group Ltd Office Project, Chongqing, China (2022)
- Hengqin International Financial Centre, Zhuhai, China (2020)
- Star Performance Centre, One North, Singapore
- Sandcrawler, Singapore
- SAS Crown, the tallest building in Hyderabad, India
- Heartland 66 Office Tower
- Dubai Metro, Dubai, UAE
- Sunny Bay Station, Hong Kong
- Trojena Ski Village, NEOM, KSA
- Gidori, NEOM, KSA
- The Ellinikon Commercial Hub, Athens, Greece
- Lovi Center, Xi'an, China
- Hangzhou Yuhang Headquarters & Industry Park Project, Hangzhou, China
- OCT Ruiwan Tower, Shenzhen, China
- T33, Shenzhen, China

=== Work in mixed-commercial sector (2010s) ===
Aedas' designed completed mixed-commercial projects include The Star in Singapore (2012), Lè Architecture in Taipei (2017), Starlight Place in Chongqing (2011), Center 66 in Wuxi (2014), Evergrande Plaza in Chengdu (2015), Sincere Financial Center in Chongqing (2015), and Olympia 66 in Dalian (2015).

In 2006, Aedas established a Seattle office to expand its footprints and completed Building Cure. Aedas was included in Building Design magazine’s list of the world's largest architectural practices since 2006. It remains in Top 15 to date.

In June 2024, Aedas was among ten companies to receive the (Building and Construction Information) BCI Asia Top 10 Architects Award.

== Recent work ==
Aedas has completed more than one-hundred projects. Projects include:

- Boulevard Plaza, Dubai, UAE
- Centres of Central, Hong Kong
- Hong Kong International Airport Midfield Concourse and North Satellite Concourse, Hong Kong
- Olympia 66, Dalian, Liaoning, China
- R&F Centre, Guangzhou, Guangdong, China
- Express Rail Link West Kowloon Terminus, Hong Kong
- Xi'an Jiaotong-Liverpool University Central Building, Suzhou, Jiangsu, China
- Lè Architecture, Taipei, Taiwan
- Taichung Commercial Bank Headquarters, Taichung, Taiwan
- SAS Crown, Hyderabad, India
