= RSHP =

British architectural firm

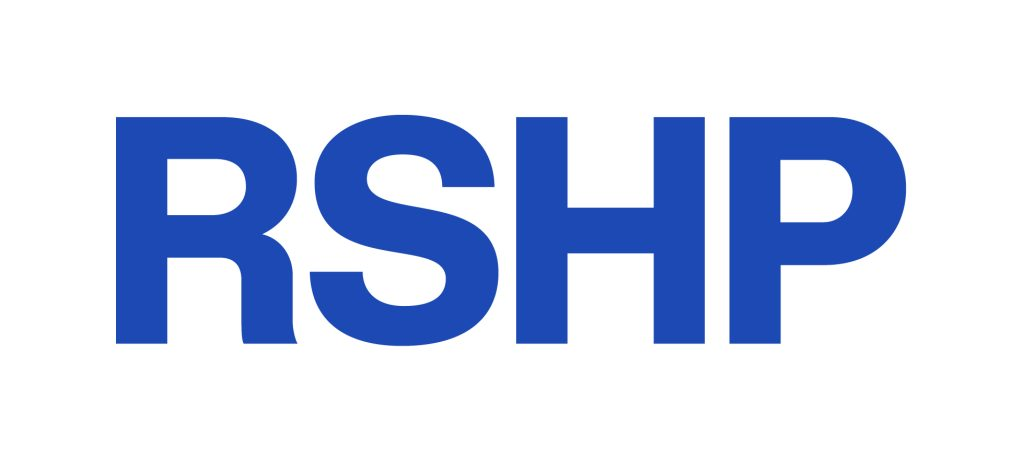

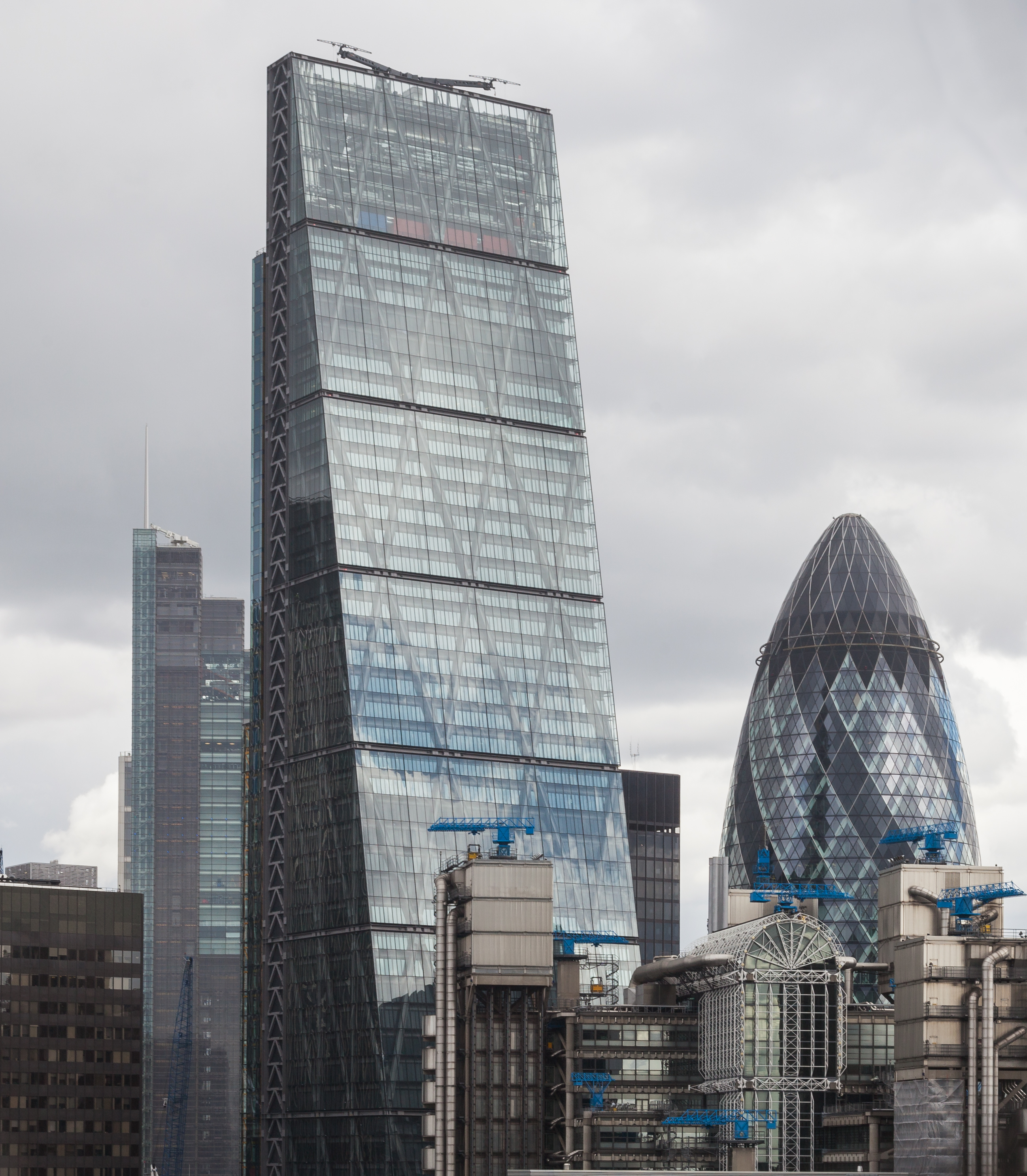
- Leadenhall Building, designed by RSHP and now its head office. In the foreground, the Lloyd's building also designed by RSHP.

Practice information
- Key architects: Graham Stirk, Ivan Harbour
- Founded: 1977; 49 years ago as the Richard Rogers Partnership
- Location: Level 14, 122 Leadenhall Street, London.

Significant works and honors
- Buildings: Maggie's Centre, London; One Hyde Park, London; Heathrow Terminal 5, London; Central Park Station, Taiwan
- Projects: Grand Paris
- Awards: Manser Medal (2008); Stirling Prize (2006 & 2009)

RSHP is a British architectural firm, founded in 1977 and previously known as the Richard Rogers Partnership which became Rogers Stirk Harbour + Partners in 2007. The firm rebranded from Rogers Stirk Harbour + Partners to simply RSHP on 30 June 2022, after the retirement and subsequent death of Richard Rogers on 18 December 2021. Its main offices are located in the Leadenhall Building, London, completed to the firm's designs in 2014. Previously, they were at the Thames Wharf Studios. In its various incarnations RSHP has designed many important buildings including the Lloyd's building and the Millennium Dome in London and the Senedd building in Cardiff.

== Description ==
In addition to the principal offices, the firm also maintains offices in Shanghai, Sydney and Paris. As of October 2023 the firm has 10 partners, including Graham Stirk and Ivan Harbour. The practice is run with a profit-share scheme and a limit on the directors' salaries, in comparison with those of the lowest paid in the office.

It is owned by a charitable trust, ensuring that no individual owns any share in its value and preventing private trading and inheritance of shares. The practice divides its profits among all of the staff and their chosen charities, according to publicly declared principles.

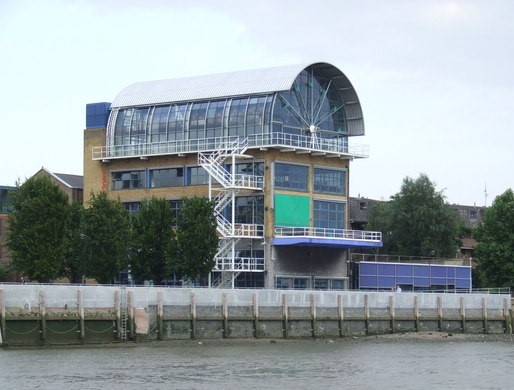
The previous head office at Thames Wharf Studios, Hammersmith

The practice is strongly focused on sustainability, urban regeneration and social awareness. Celebration of public space and the encouragement of public activities is also a recurring theme.

== History ==
Soon after the Pompidou Centre in Paris was opened in 1977, Richard Rogers formed the Richard Rogers Partnership and started work on the Lloyd's building in London. Rogers explained that the reason for the change of the practice name from the Richard Rogers Partnership to Rogers Stirk Harbour + Partners in 2007 was because, "We wanted to avoid the situation where the name of the practice is someone who died 100 years ago. Architecture is a living thing. If I want to leave something to the future, it has to be able to change – but retain something of the ethos that we built up over 50 years."

In November 2015, Rogers Stirk Harbour created five new partners including Tracy Meller, who became their first female partner. Founding partner Mike Davies stepped down.

In June 2022, the company rebranded to RSHP, following Rogers' retirement in June 2020 and death in December 2021.

== Awards ==
In 2006, the practice was awarded the Stirling Prize for their design of Terminal 4 at Madrid-Barajas Airport

In 2008, RSHP was awarded the Manser Medal for Houses and Housing, given for the best one-off house (Oxley Woods) designed by an architect in the United Kingdom.

In 2009, it was awarded the Stirling Prize for Maggie's Centre in London. It won the RIBA National Award 2015 for NEO Bankside luxury apartments in London and was subsequently shortlisted for the Stirling Prize for the second time.

== Notable projects ==
This list contains projects from the beginning of the partnership in 1977 through to the present day. For earlier work by Richard Rogers, Team 4, Richard and Su Rogers and Piano + Rogers, see the Richard Rogers page.

The Richard Rogers Partnership

- Lloyd's building, London, UK (1978–84)
- Fleetguard Manufacturing Plant, Quimper, France (1979–1981)
- Inmos microprocessor factory, Newport, Wales (1980–1982)
- Parco Lineare Arno River, Florence, Italy (1982)
- PA Technology Centre, Princeton, New Jersey, United States (1982–1985)
- Old Billingsgate Market, London, UK (1985–1988)
- Centre Commercial St. Herbain, Nantes, France (1986–1987)
- The Deckhouse, Thames Reach, London, UK (1986–1989)
- Paternoster Square, London, UK (1987)
- 45 Royal Avenue, London, UK (1987)
- The River Café (London), UK (1987)
- Reuters Data Centre, London, UK (1987–1992)
- Kabuki-cho Tower, Tokyo, Japan (1987–1993)
- Linn Products, Waterfoot, Glasgow (1988)
- Antwerp Law Courts, Belgium (2000–2006)
- Marseille Provence Airport, Marignane, France (1989–1992)
- Heathrow air traffic control tower, London, UK (1989–2007)
- 124 Horseferry Road, Channel 4 headquarters, London, UK (1990–1994)
- European Court of Human Rights building, Strasbourg, France, 1995
- 88 Wood Street, London, UK (1990–1999)
- Tower Bridge House, London, UK (1990–2005)
- Daimler complex, Potsdamer Platz, Berlin (1993–1999)
- Palais de Justice de Bordeaux, Bordeaux, France (1993–1999)
- Montevetro (apartments), Battersea Reach, London, UK (1994–2000)
- Lloyd's Register building, London, UK (1995–1999)
- Minami-Yamashiro Primary School, near Kyoto, Japan (1995–2003)
- Millennium Dome, London, UK (1996–1999)
- Broadwick House, London, UK (1996–2000)
- Designer retail outlet centre, Ashford, Kent, UK (1996–2000)
- Madrid-Barajas Airport terminal 4, Madrid, Spain (1997–2006)
- Chiswick Business Park, London, UK (1998–)
- Paddington Waterside, London, UK (1999–2004)
- Mossbourne Community Academy, London, UK (2002–2004)
- Senedd (Welsh Parliament building), Cardiff, UK (1999–2005)
- East River Waterfront, New York City (2004–2006)
- Hesperia Tower, Barcelona, Spain (2005)

Selection of Richard Rogers Partnership projects
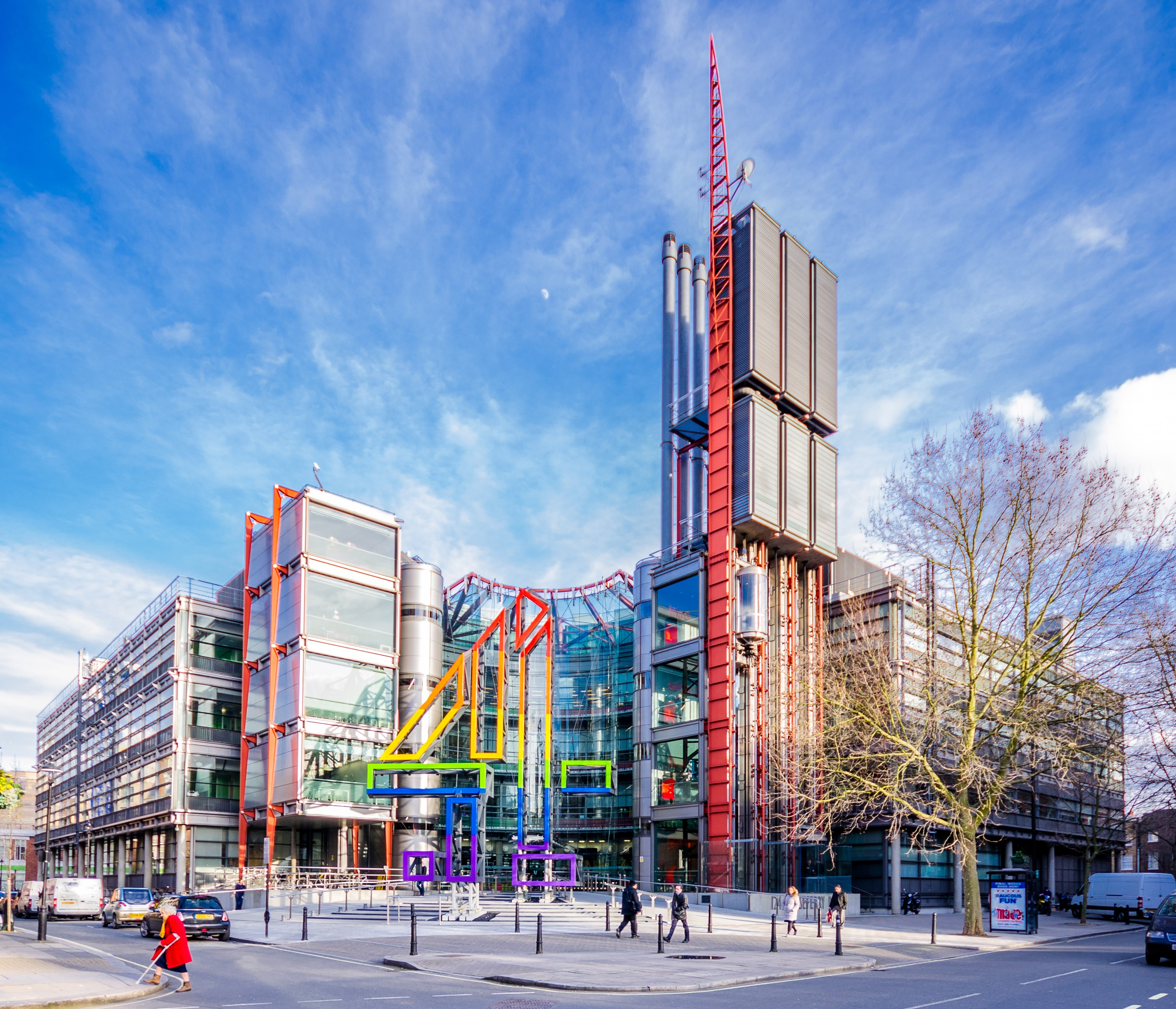
124 Horseferry Road (Channel 4 Building), London, England

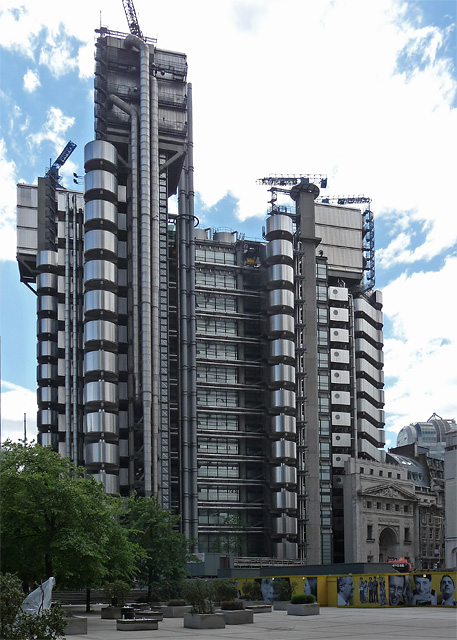
Lloyd's building, London, England

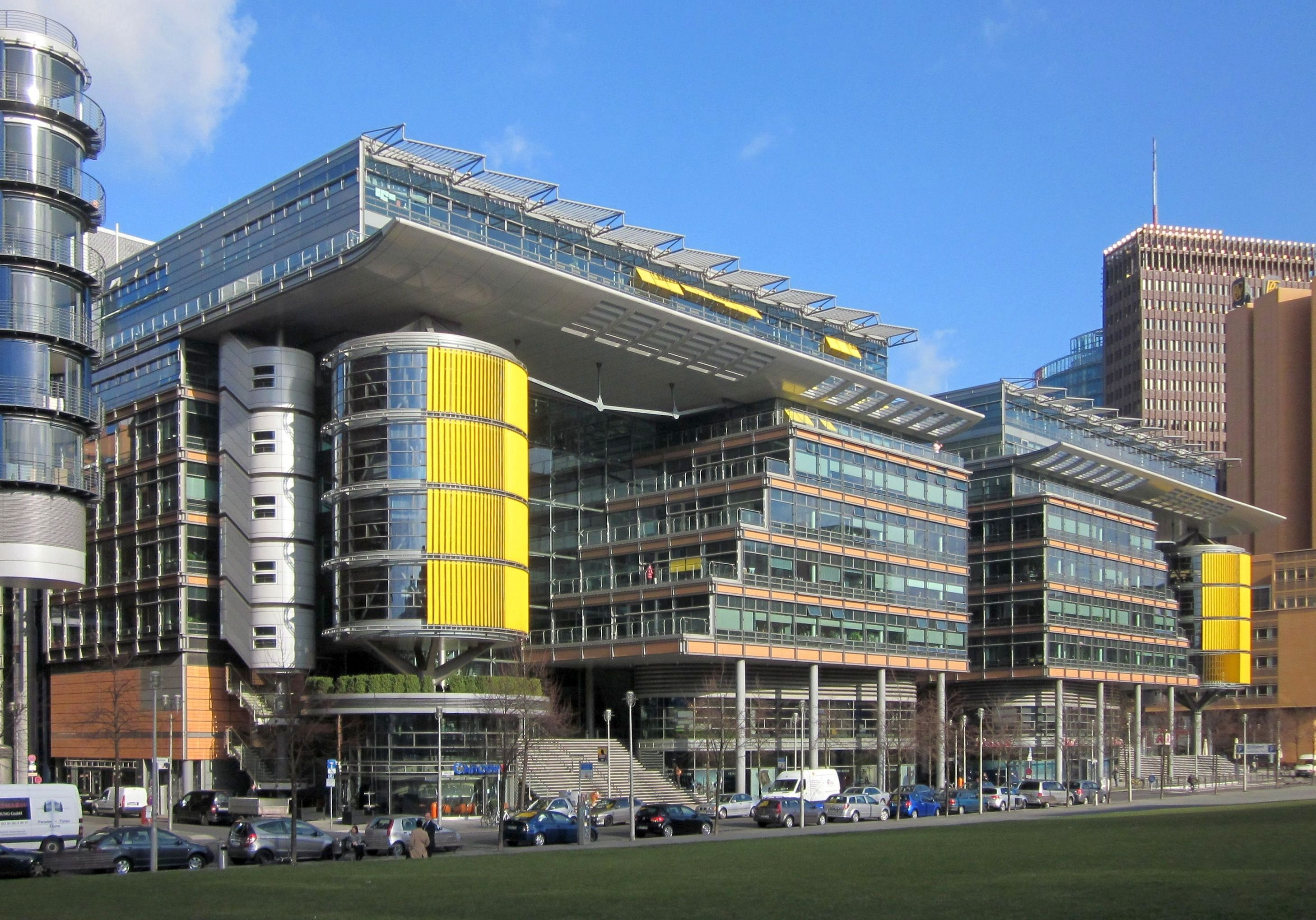
The Daimler complex (Linkstraße), Potsdamer Platz, Berlin, Germany

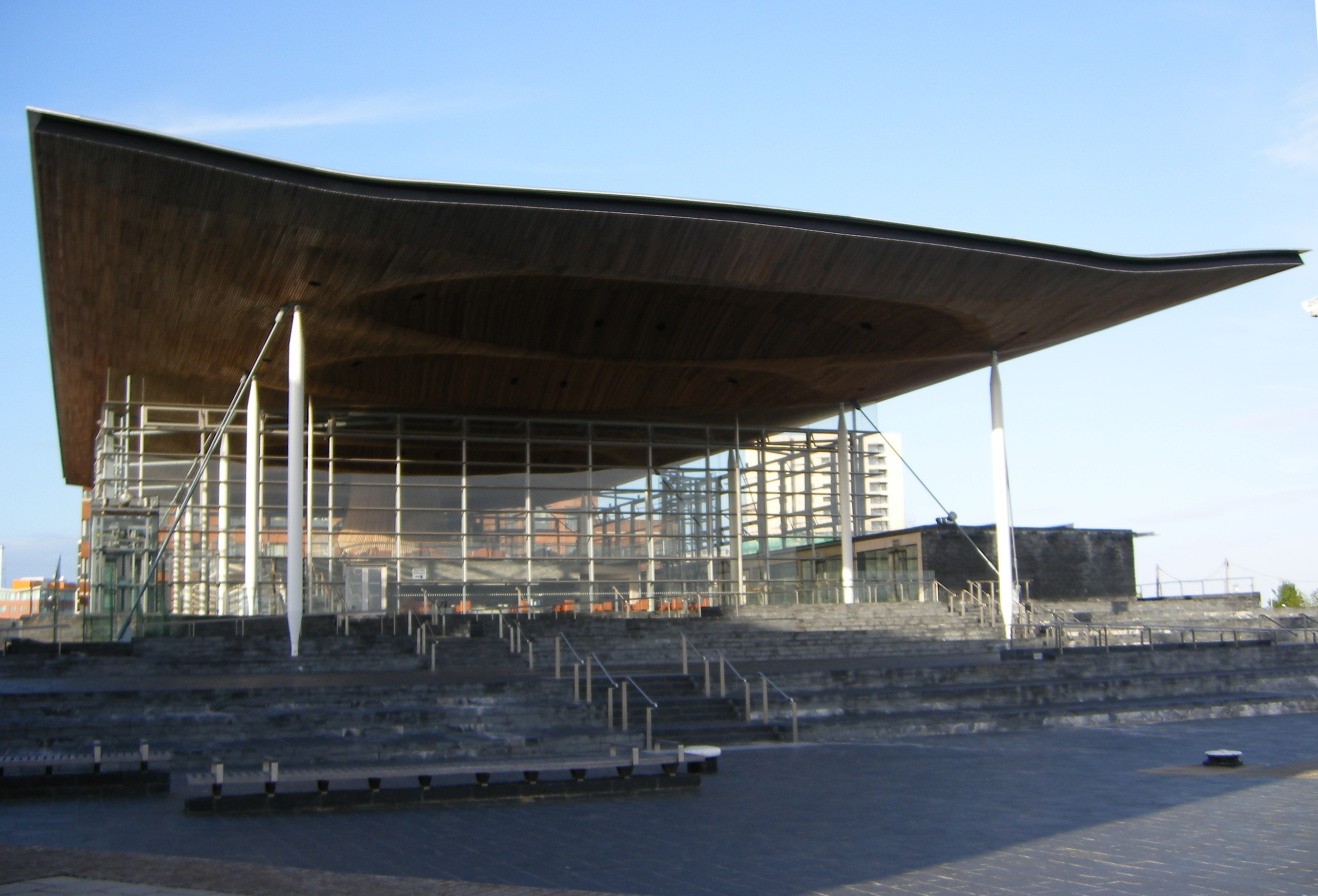
Senedd, Cardiff, Wales

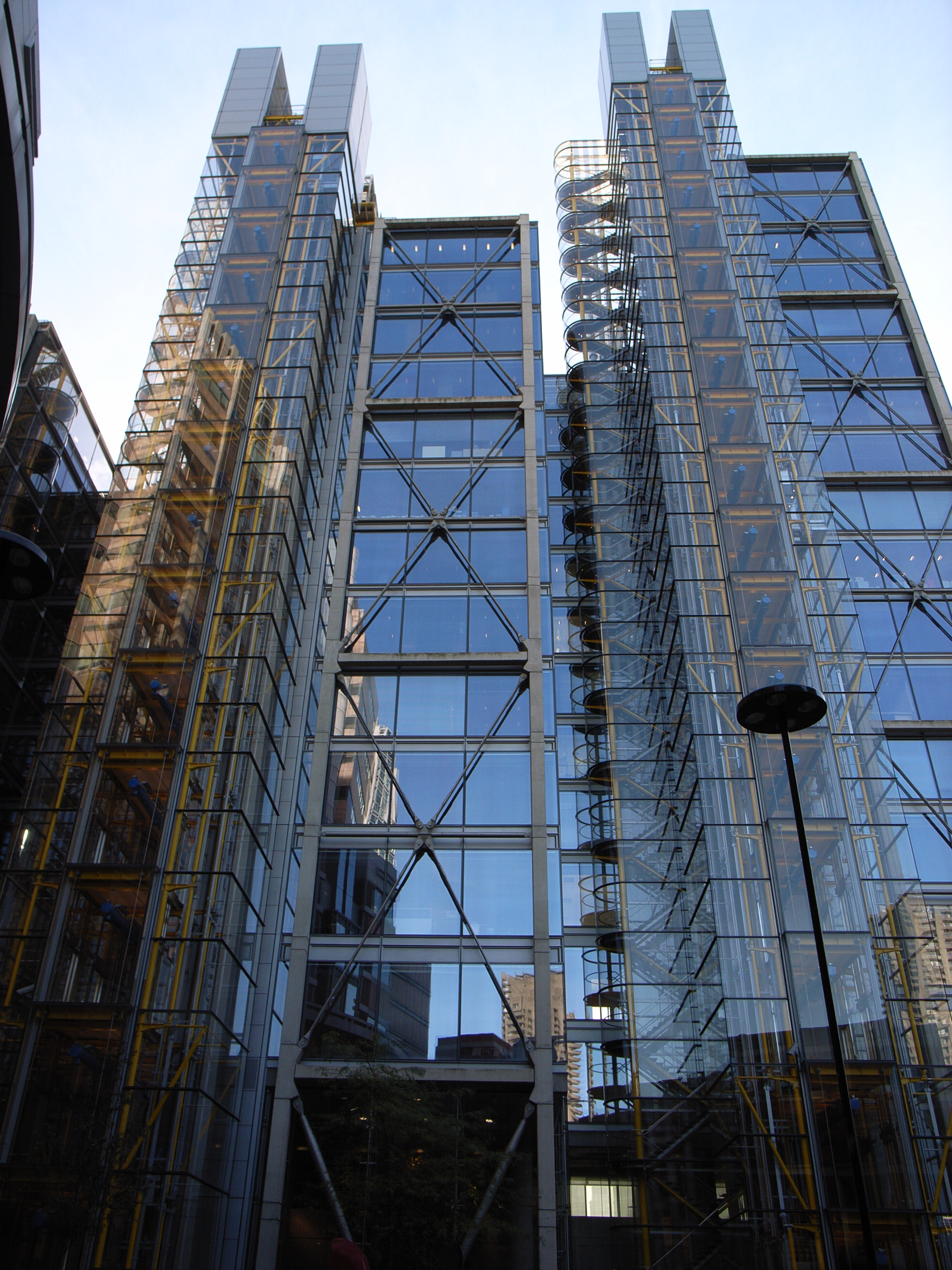
88 Wood Street, London, England

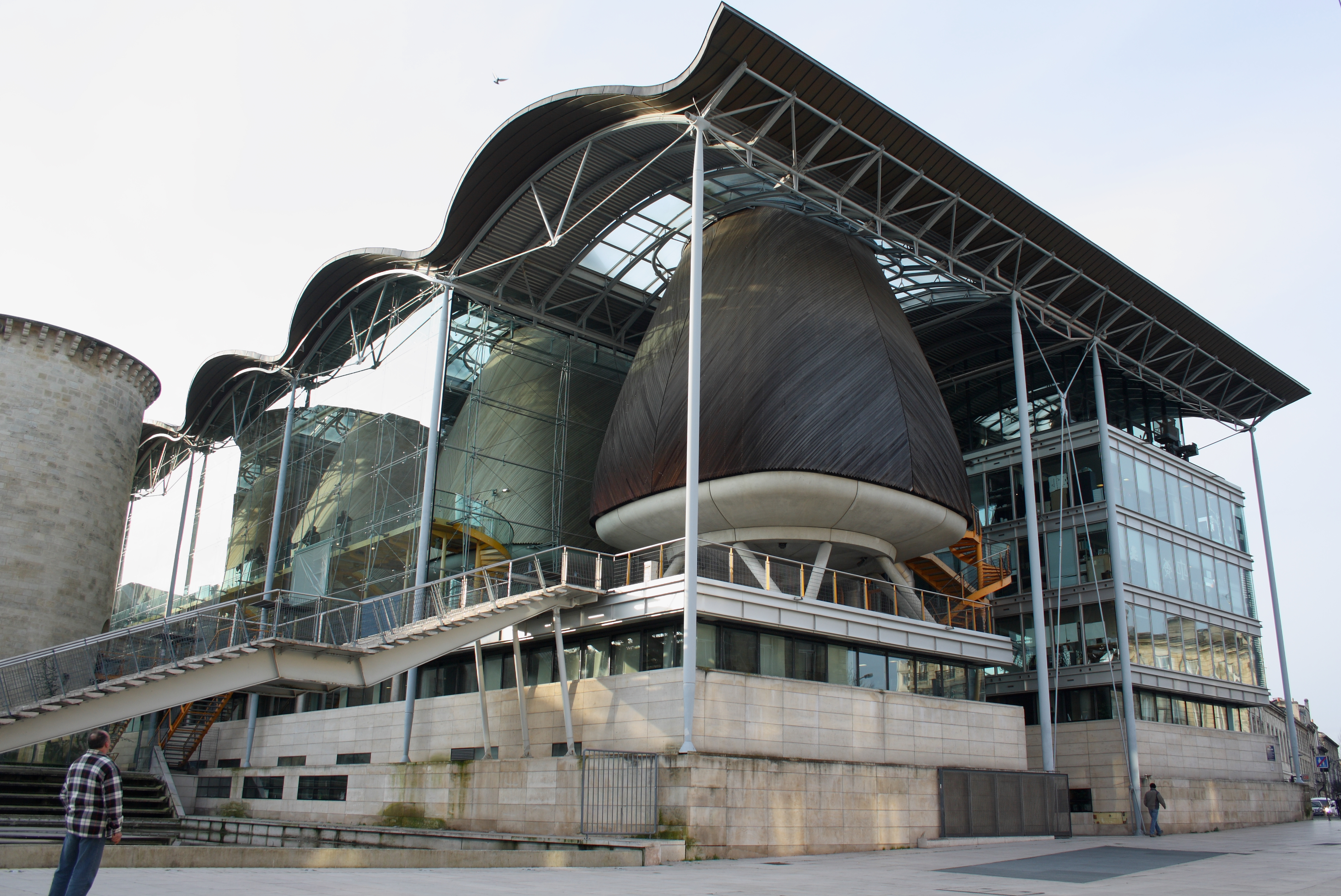
Law Court, Bordeaux, France

RSHP (and formerly Rogers Stirk Harbour + Partners)

- Heathrow Terminal 5, London, UK (1989–2008)
- Maggie's Centre, London, UK (2001–2008)
- Bodegas Protos, Peñafiel, Valladolid, Spain (2004–2008)
- Central Park Station, Kaohsiung, Taiwan (2003–2007)
- 300 New Jersey Avenue NW, Washington, D.C., United States (2004–2009)
- Ching Fu Group Headquarters, Kaohsiung, Taiwan (2005–2007)
- Campus Palmas Atlas (CPA), Seville, Spain (2005–2009)
- 3 World Trade Center, New York, United States (2006–2018)
- Capodichino Underground Station, Naples, Italy (2006–)
- Santa Maria del Pianto Underground Station, Naples, Italy (2006–2011)
- Newington Butts, London (2004–2018)
- Greater Paris / Grand Paris, France (2008–2013)
- Oxley Woods, Milton Keynes, UK; Government-sponsored 'Design for Manufacture (DfM)' competition (2004–2010)
- Las Arenas, Barcelona, remodeling of the bullring into a shopping mall (1999–2011)
- One Hyde Park, London, UK (2007–2009)
- NEO Bankside, London, UK (2012)
- New city centre and tram station in Scandicci, Italy (2006–2013)
- International Towers Sydney, Barangaroo, Sydney, Australia (2010–2016)
- 122 Leadenhall Street, also known as the Cheesegrater, London (2000–2014)
- World Conservation and Exhibitions Centre, British Museum, London, UK (2007–2014)
- 8 Chifly, Sydney, Australia (2005–2013)
- St. Lawrence Market North Revitalization, Toronto, Canada (2010–) with Adamson Associates
- Y:Cube, London (2013–2015)
- PLACE / Ladywell, London, UK (2014–2016)
- One Park Taipei, Taipei, Taiwan (2012-2016)
- The new Macallan Distillery & visitor experience (2012-2018)
- Centre Building, London School of Economics, London (2014–2019)
- Centre de conservation du Louvre, Liévin, France (2015–2019)
- Stratford Cross, London (2014-ongoing)
- Taoyuan International Airport T3, Taiwan (2015-ongoing)
- Parc1 Tower, Seoul, South Korea (2008-2020)

Selection of RSHP projects
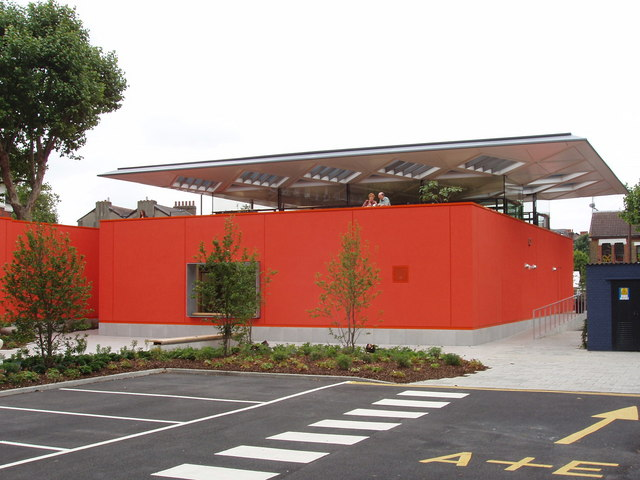
Maggie's Centre, London, England. The practice won the 2009 Stirling Prize.

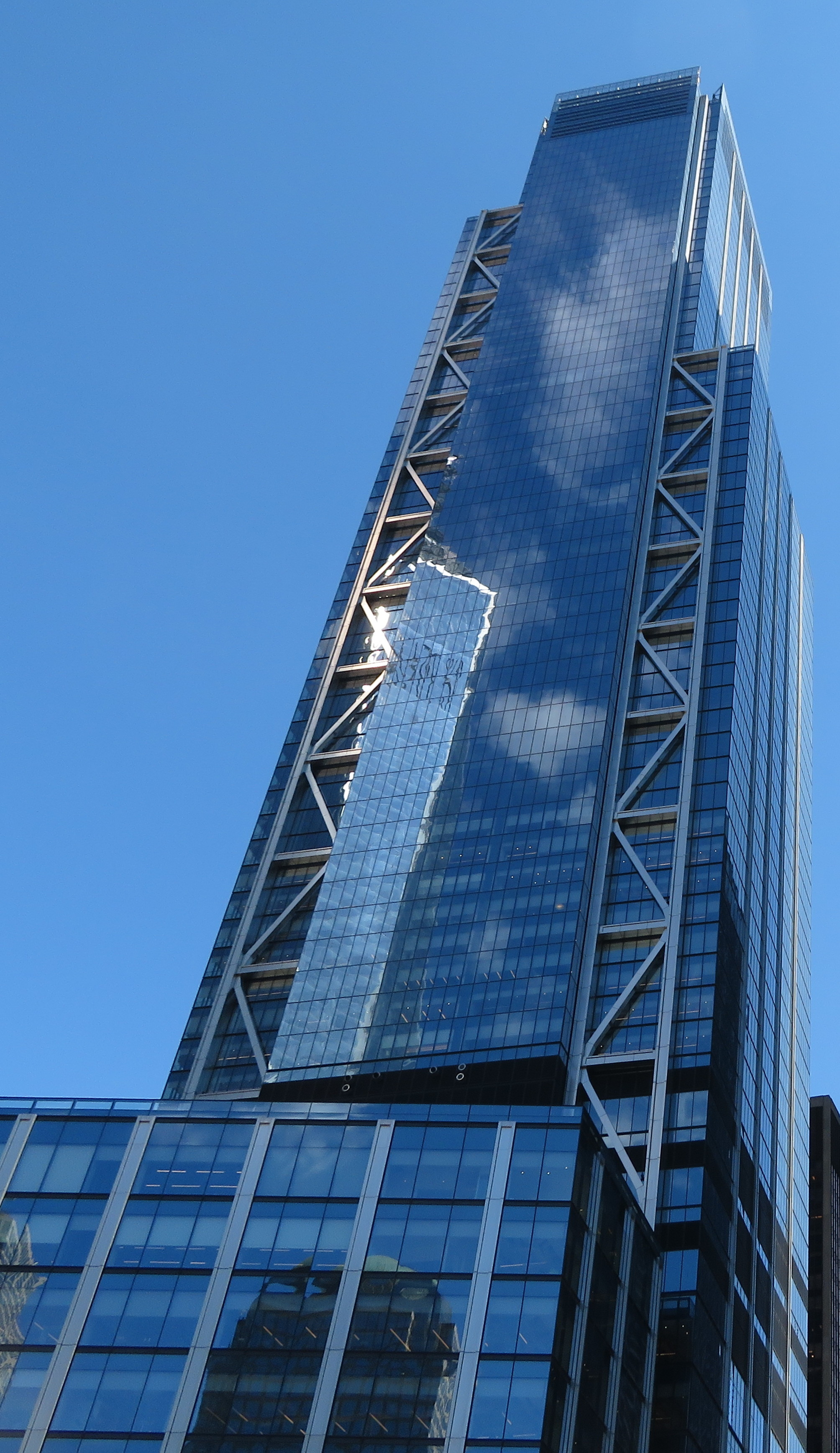
3 World Trade Center, New York City, United States

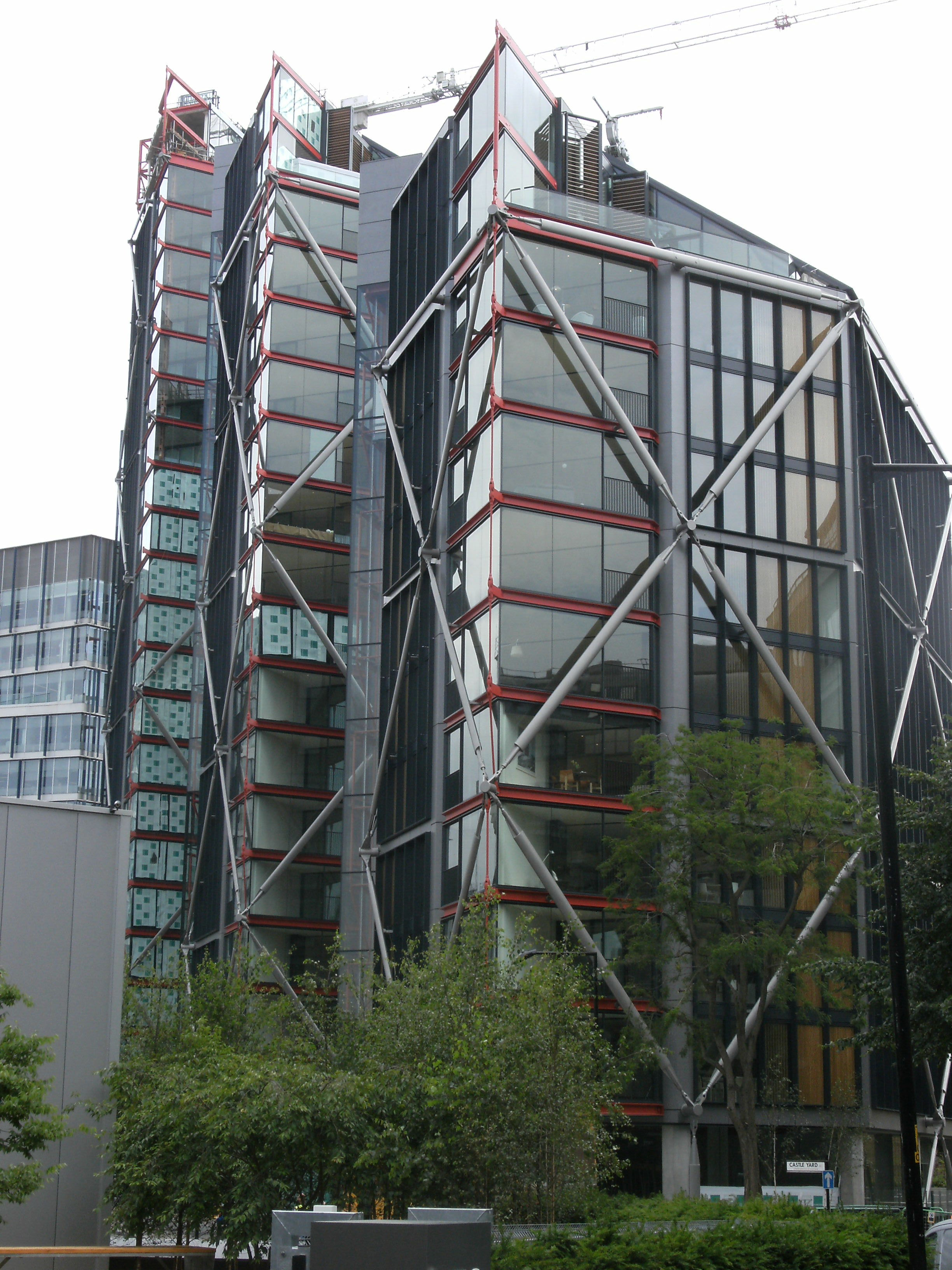
NEO Bankside, London, England

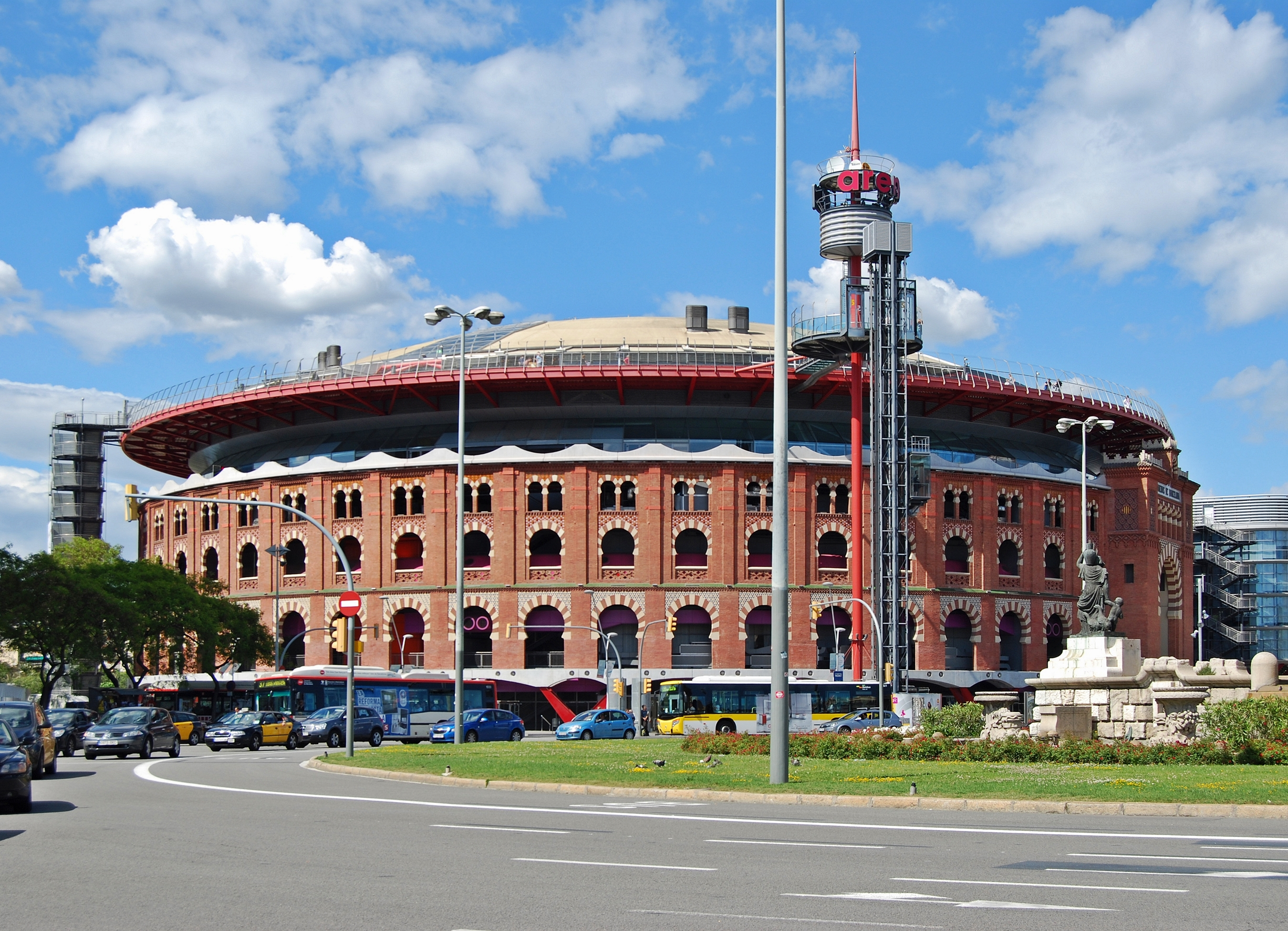
Las Arenas, Barcelona, Spain

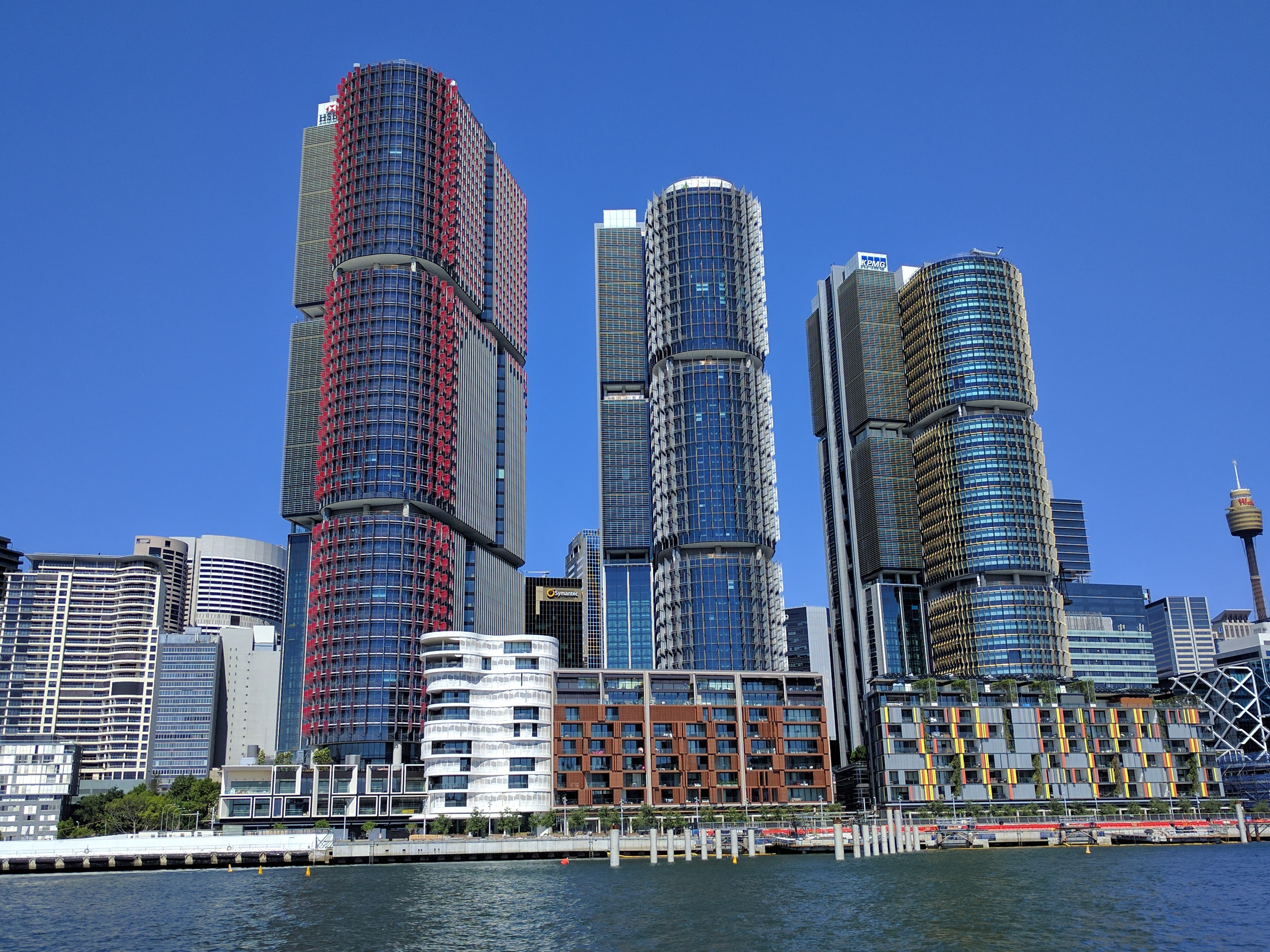
International Towers Sydney, Sydney, Australia

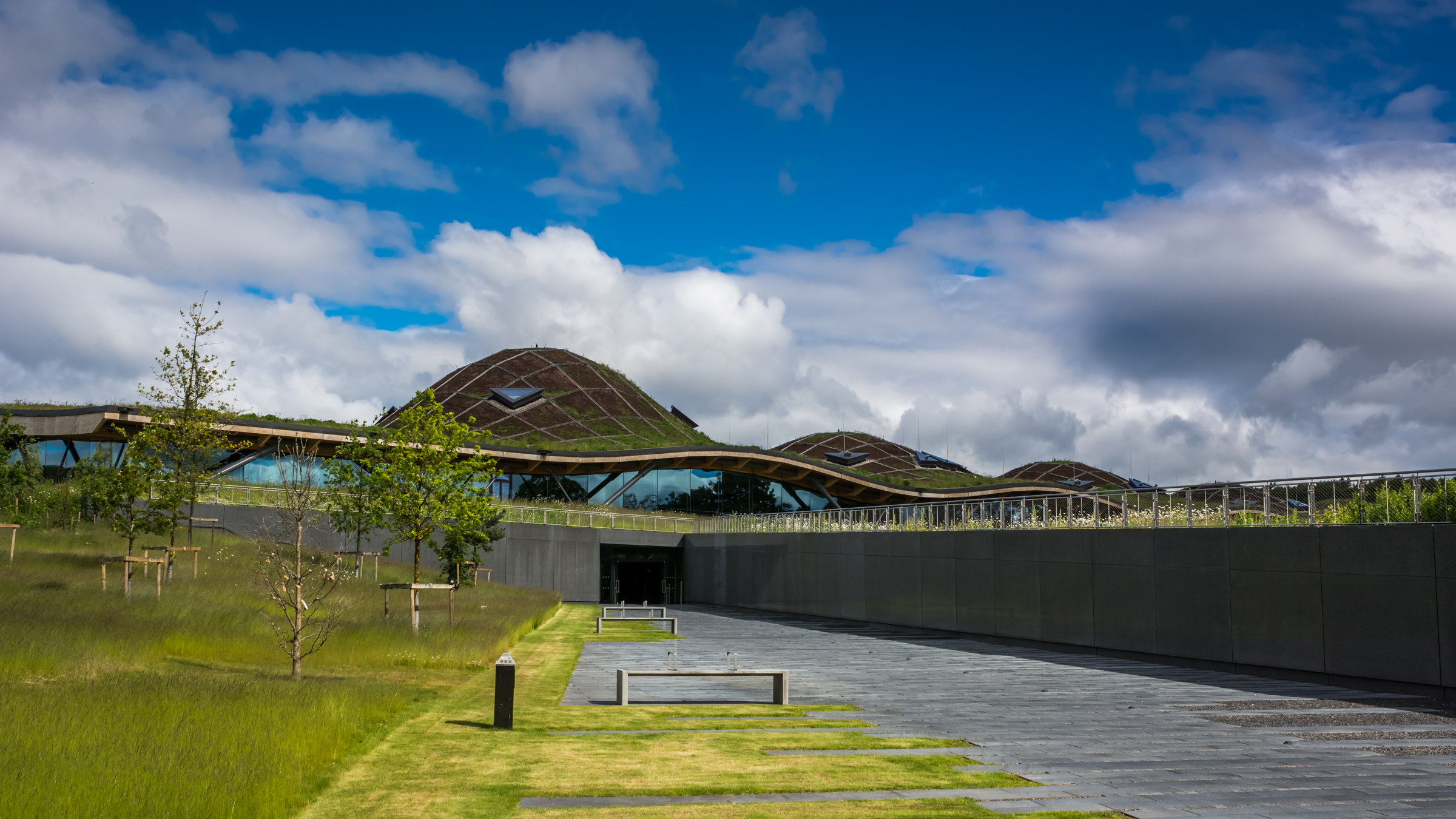
The new Macallan Distillery & visitor experience

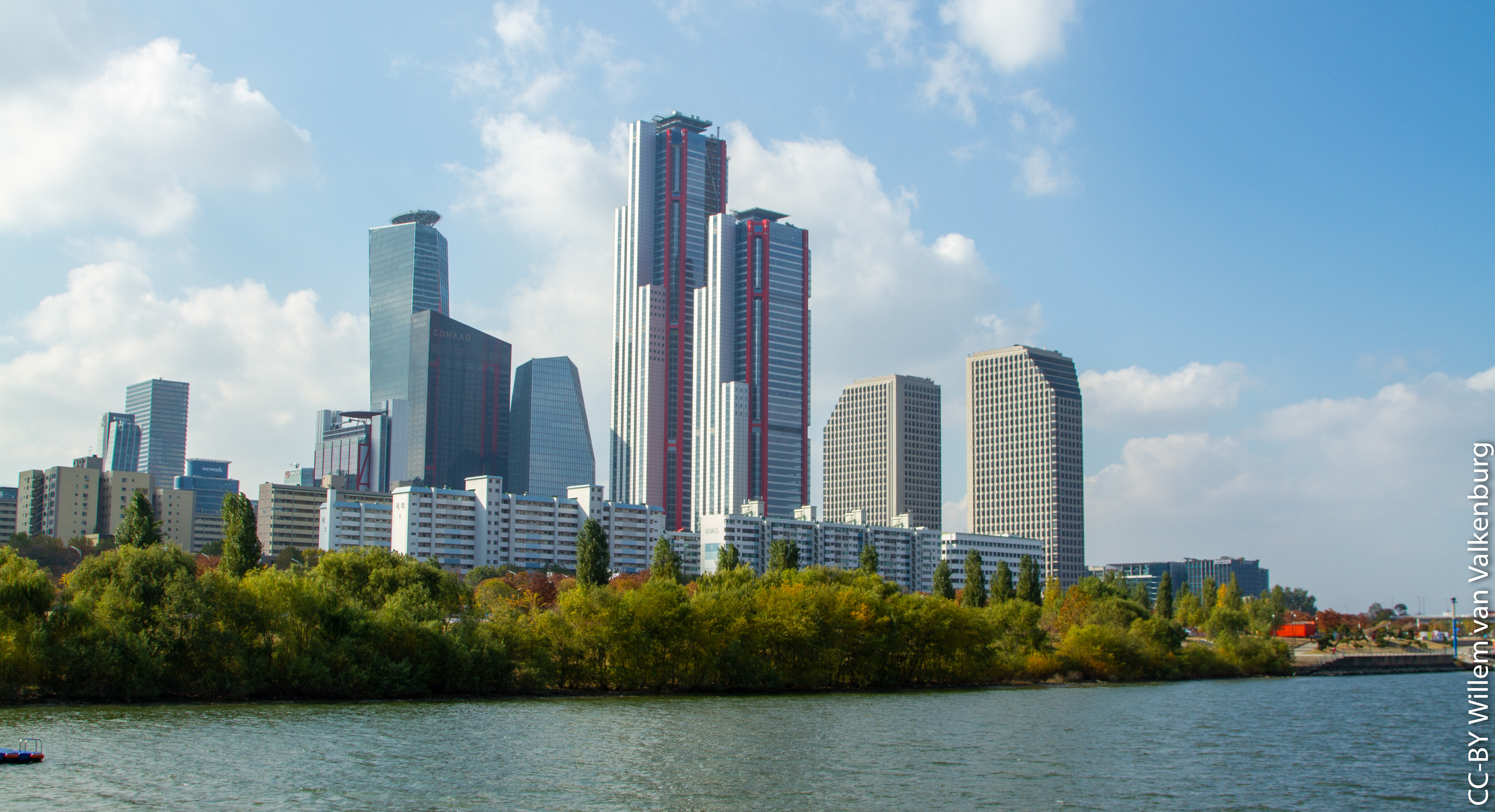
Parc1 Tower, Seoul, South Korea

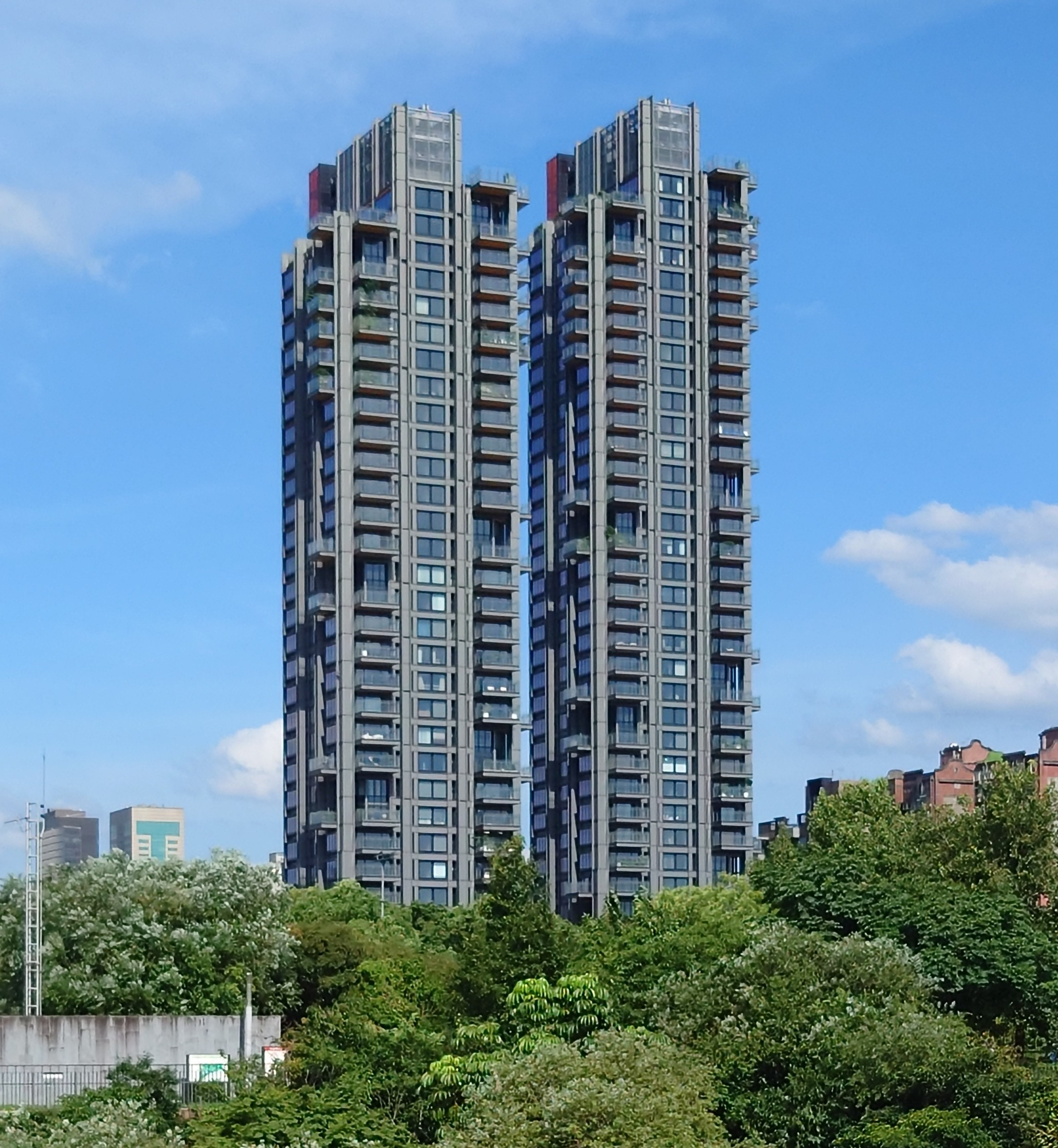
One Park Taipei, Taipei, Taiwan

== Key personnel ==
Partners of the firm as of 2014 were Richard Rogers, Mike Davies, Graham Stirk, Ivan Harbour, Andrew Morris, Lennart Grut, Richard Paul, Ian Birtles and Simon Smithson.

=== Current personnel ===
Ivan Harbour

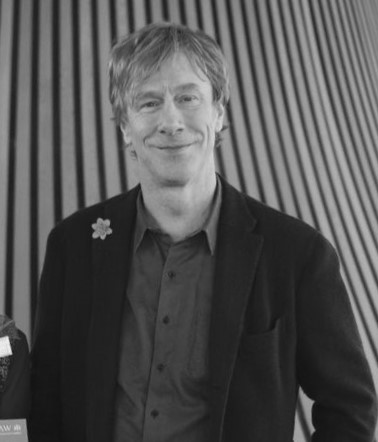
Ivan Harbour

Ivan Harbour joined Richard Rogers Partnership in 1985 and in 1993 was made a senior director. In 2007, the practice changed from Richard Rogers Partnership to Rogers Stirk Harbour + Partners. Harbour led the design team for the Senedd (National Assembly for Wales building), Terminal 4 Barajas Airport, Madrid (winner of the 2006 Stirling Prize), the Law Courts in Antwerp and Bordeaux and the European Court of Human Rights building in Strasbourg.

Harbour was lead architect for the Madrid Airport Terminal 4 project and Project Director for the first Maggie's Cancer Centre in London (winner of the 2009 Stirling Prize), and 300 New Jersey Avenue, an office building in Washington DC (due for completion in Summer 2009).

Graham Stirk

Graham Stirk joined Richard Rogers Partnership in 1983 and was made a senior director in 1995. He has been involved in the design of a number of projects in the United Kingdom and worldwide, including Japan, USA, France, Italy, Spain, Germany and Ireland.

Stirk is the Design Director of several major projects, including the 48-storey office tower at 122 Leadenhall Street in the City of London and NEO Bankside in London, a residential scheme consisting of 229 apartments and an extension to the British Museum. Stirk also contributed to the design of several key masterplanning projects including Potsdamer Platz, Berlin and Paddington Basin, London. Stirk was Director in Charge of the expansion to the Lloyd's Register of Shipping building at 71 Fenchurch Street, One Hyde Park and 88 Wood Street.

=== Previous personnel ===
Richard Rogers

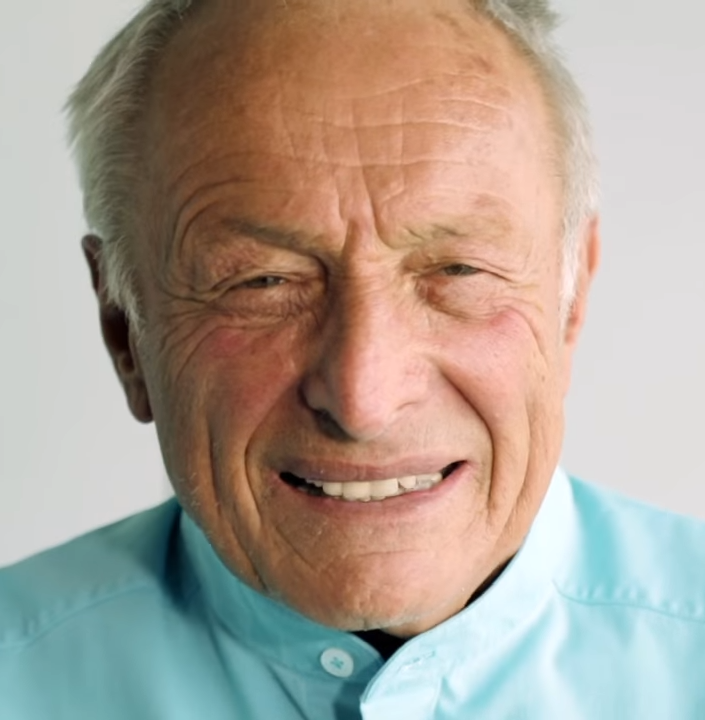
Richard Rogers

Richard Rogers won most of the major awards available to architects, including the Royal Gold Medal in 1985, the Praemium Imperiale in 2000 and the 2007 Pritzker Prize. He was knighted in 1991 and made a life peer in 1996. In addition the practice has won numerous awards for individual buildings including the Stirling Prize twice, for Barajas Airport and the Maggie's Centre at Charing Cross Hospital.

He was the 2007 Pritzker Architecture Prize Laureate and was knighted in 1991 and made a life peer in 1996.

Rogers' first work came when he co-founded Team 4 in 1963 with Su Brumwell, Wendy Cheesman and Norman Foster. Team 4's first project was Creek Vean, a residential property in Cornwall. Team 4 dissolved in 1967. He then established a partnership with Su Rogers (née Brumwell), John Young and Laurie Abbott in 1967. By July 1971 Rogers had won a design competition to build the Pompidou Centre in Paris with co-partner with Italian architect Renzo Piano.

In 1977, he established the Richard Rogers Partnership with Marco Goldschmied and Mike Davies, where they went on to design the Lloyd's Building and Millennium Dome both in London, the Senedd in Cardiff, and the European Court of Human Rights building in Strasbourg.

In September 2020, Rogers announced that he had stepped down from the practice and that his name would be removed from the firm's in due course. He had formally retired from the board in June of the same year.

Mike Davies

Mike Davies was a founding partner of the Richard Rogers Partnership and a senior partner in RSHP. He joined the partnership between Richard Rogers and Renzo Piano in 1971, shortly after they won the commission to design the Pompidou Centre in Paris, and later became one of the founding directors of the Richard Rogers Partnership in 1977.

Davies was the project director for the Millennium Dome in London and for Heathrow Terminal 5 and is currently project director for Grand Paris. He stepped down from his role in the company at the end of 2015.

Rogers Stirk Harbour reorganised the business at the end of 2015 and Davies stepped down from his role as a partner in the company. He continued working for them in a part-time capacity.

Marco Goldschmied

Marco Goldschmied first joined Richard Rogers in 1969.

He was co-founder of the Richard Rogers Partnership along with Mike Davies and John Young in 1977 became its managing director in 1984. He left the practice on 30 June 2004. Rogers and Goldschmied were involved in a £10 million lawsuit, which was settled out of court in 2006, where the Richard Rogers Partnership would remain in the property along with River Café.

Laurie Abbott

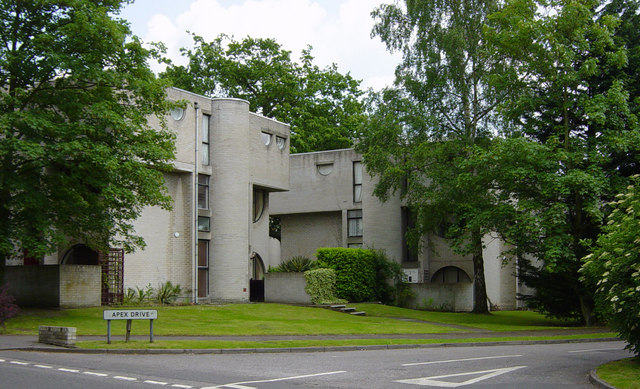
House built by Laurie Abbott in Frimley, Surrey

Laurie Abbott joined Team 4 as an assistant architect, working on Creek Vean in Cornwall.

He built small development of properties in Frimley, was a senior director at the Richard Rogers Partnership, and was involved in the Pompidou Centre and the Lloyd's building.

Amanda Levete

Amanda Levete was born 17 November 1955. She joined the Richard Rogers Partnership in 1984, and left in 1989 to join Jan Kaplický as a partner in Future Systems.

John Young

Richard and Su Rogers along with John Young and Laurie Abbott, went into partnership after Team 4 had dissolved. He continued to work with Richard Rogers while in the Piano + Rogers partnership. Young along with Goldschmeid, Davies and Rogers set up the Richard Rogers Partnership in 1976.

Other notable staff Numerous other architects worked in the practice before founding their own firms. They include Eva Jiricna, Alan Stanton, Chris Wilkinson, and Jan Kaplický.
