= R&F Centre =

R&F Center
- 富力中心
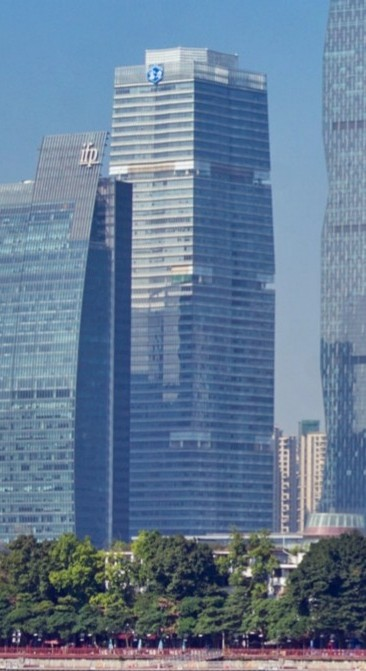
- R&F Centre in December 2016
- Interactive map of the R&F Center area
- Alternative names: Fuli Zhongxin

General information
- Status: Completed
- Type: Commercial offices
- Architectural style: Modernism
- Location: Huaxia Road, Guangzhou, China
- Coordinates: 23.11994°N 113.31647°E
- Construction started: 2005
- Completed: 2007
- Owner: Guangzhou R&F Properties

Height
- Roof: 243 m (797 ft)

Technical details
- Floor count: 54, and 5 below ground
- Floor area: 121,755 m^{2} (1,310,560 sq ft)

Design and construction
- Architect: Aedas
- Engineer: Parsons Brinckerhoff Consultants Private Limited (MEP)

The R&F Centre is a 54-storey 243 m (797 ft) office skyscraper, designed by Aedas, on Huaxia Road in Tianhe District of Guangzhou, Guangdong, China. The glass and steel tower is modeled after a jade vase. Construction began in 2005 and it was completed in 2007.

The R&F Centre is the headquarters of R&F Properties, a Guangzhou-based developer. It is adjacent to the GZ IFC and the IFP. It is directly opposite Exit B2 of Zhujiang New Town Station. Tenants of the building include several consulates and chambers of commerce.

== See also ==
- List of tallest buildings in the world
