= Oxley Woods =

Housing development in Milton Keynes, England

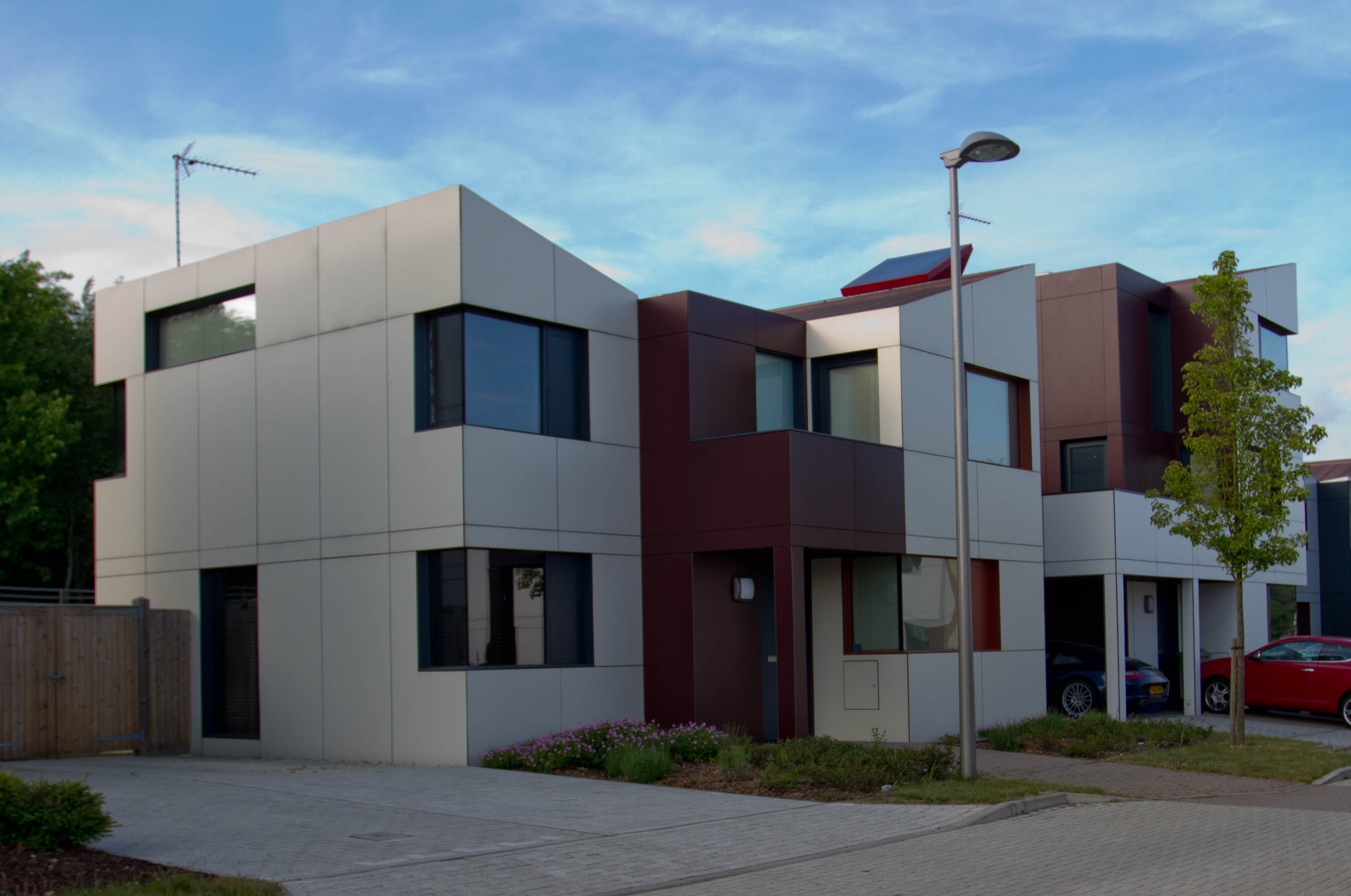
- Oxley Woods
- Interactive map of Oxley Woods

General information
- Location: Milton Keynes, England
- Coordinates: 52.0108°N 0.8049°W
- Status: Completed
- Area: 3.26 ha (8.1 acres)

Construction
- Constructed: 2005-2007
- Architect: Rogers Stirk Harbour + Partners
- Contractors: Newton Woods, Taylor Wimpey

Oxley Woods is a housing development in Oxley Park, a district of Milton Keynes, Buckinghamshire, England. The development was designed by Rogers Stirk Harbour + Partners and built by Newton Woods, who were subcontracted by Taylor Wimpey after winning the Office of the Deputy Prime Minister's Design for Manufacture Competition, which was run by English Partnerships in 2005.

== The design process and construction ==
=== Design for Manufacture Competition ===
John Prescott, the Deputy Prime Minister announced the competition to construct a home for around £60,000 on 26 September 2004. 53 firms/consortiums submitted pre-qualifying questionnaire by the deadline of 13 May 2005. On 1 June 2005, John Prescott announced that 33 firms had been invited to take part in the Design for Manufacture Competition to design and construct homes on 10 sites in England. They would be invited to submit firm proposals by July 2005. The Design for Manufacture Competition was run by English Partnerships on behalf of the Office of the Deputy Prime Minister (now known as the Department for Communities and Local Government. The 10 sites chosen for the competition were in Leeds, Aylesbury Vale, Upton (Northampton), Newport Pagnell, Basingstoke, Maidstone, Hastings, Stone and Merton as well as Oxley Park, Milton Keynes. In November 2005, the successful bidders for the first four sites were announced, which included Rogers Stirk Harbour + Partners as architects and George Wimpey as the builders, to build on Oxley Park.

=== Construction ===
It was planned that a total of 145 houses would be built on the 3.26 ha (8.1 acres) site. In total there would be 11 house styles, from 2 bedroom maisonettes to five bedroom family houses. It would be a mix of affordable housing and larger private dwellings.

The houses would take advantage of a range of new technologies and processes involving prefabrication and off-site assembly. This would reduce the construction time, but also reduce waste and energy in the transportation of materials to site. Each house would have a timber frame. The cladding panel would mean that waste was reduced to just 15% during manufacturing. The structure would take just one week to manufacture in the factory before travelling to site. The external element of the building would take just two days to form the shell, without the need for any scaffolding. The interior of the building would take just two weeks to complete. The first houses went up for sale in Spring 2007.

== Awards for Oxley Woods ==
- 2007 Housebuilding Innovation Awards – Best Material/Product Innovation
- 2008 RIBA Manser Medal
- 2008 RIBA South Awards
- 2008 RICS South East Award for Sustainability
- 2008 Housing Design Awards, Large Housebuilder Winner
- 2008 HotProperty New Homes Awards – Platinum Award for Green Homes
- 2008 HotProperty New Homes Awards – Gold Award for Design and Innovation
- 2008 RIBA / English Partnerships Sustainability Award
- 2008 Evening Standard New Homes Award – Highly Commended
- 2009 National Affordable Home Ownership Housing Awards, Best Environmentally Friendly Scheme
- 2009 National House-Building Council (NHBC) Pride in the Job – Seal of Excellence (Site Manager Nigel Mitchell)
- 2009 International Architecture Awards
- Building for Life, Gold Standard

== Problems with Oxley Woods ==
There have been problems with the design and manufacture of the houses. The problems have included the following:

- Rainscreen cladding panels becoming detached
- Damp-proof membranes missing from windows and behind cladding panels
- Supporting battens and structure suffering from dry and wet rot
- Coping detail to the top of the parapets found to be discharging water run-off into cavities saturating the boarding, supporting battens and timber frames
- Windows suffering from excessive moisture
- Loose roof coverings
- Leaks and excessive condensation build-up around rooflights
