= Boulevard Plaza =

- Interactive map of the Boulevard Plaza area

General information
- Status: Complete
- Type: Office
- Location: Dubai, United Arab Emirates
- Coordinates: 25.20037°N 55.27324°E
- Construction started: 2007
- Completed: 2010/2011

Height
- Antenna spire: 168.45 m (552.7 ft) Boulevard Plaza 1; 141.13 m (463.0 ft) Boulevard Plaza 2

Technical details
- Floor count: 37 (2 basement floors) Boulevard Plaza 1; 30 (4 basement floors) Boulevard Plaza 2

Design and construction
- Architects: Aedas, Andrew Bromberg
- Developer: Emaar Properties

Boulevard Plaza is a complex contains Boulevard Plaza 1 and Boulevard Plaza 2 located in Downtown Dubai in Dubai, United Arab Emirates. The towers were proposed for construction on 2005, with the commencement of construction in 2007 and ended in 2010. The Boulevard Plaza 1 rises 168.45 m (552.7 ft) and Boulevard Plaza 2 rises 141.13 m (463.0 ft), while the complex have 37 and 30 floors respectively. Boulevard Plaza are located in Downtown Dubai, adjacent to the world's tallest building Burj Khalifa.

== See also ==
- List of tallest buildings in Dubai
- Downtown Dubai
