= Institute of Continuing Professional Development =

Institute in the United Kingdom

The Institute of Continuing Professional Development (ICPD, or CPD Institute) is an institute concerned with continuing professional development (CPD) in the United Kingdom. It provides CPD qualifications.

The institute has defined CPD to be:

a process by which a professional person maintains the quality and relevance of professional services throughout his/her life.

The ICPD is part of The Harris Foundation for Lifelong Learning (previously the Continuing Professional Development Foundation), an educational non-profit charitable trust that has provided CPD since 1981, based in London, England. The institute has corporate affiliates. A Fellow of the institute can use the post-nominal FInstCPD. In 2008, a new "Member" grade was launched.

== See also ==
- List of post-nominal letters (United Kingdom)
