= Mike Davies (architect) =

English architect

Mike Davies CBE RIBA FRSA FRGS FICPD
- Born: 25 January 1942 (age 84); England
- Education: Architectural Association School of Architecture, UCLA, Northern Polytechnic
- Occupation: Architect
- Awards: Légion d’honneur
- Practice: Rogers Stirk Harbour + Partners
- Buildings: Centre Georges Pompidou; Lloyd's building (Grade I); Millennium Dome; Heathrow Terminal 5

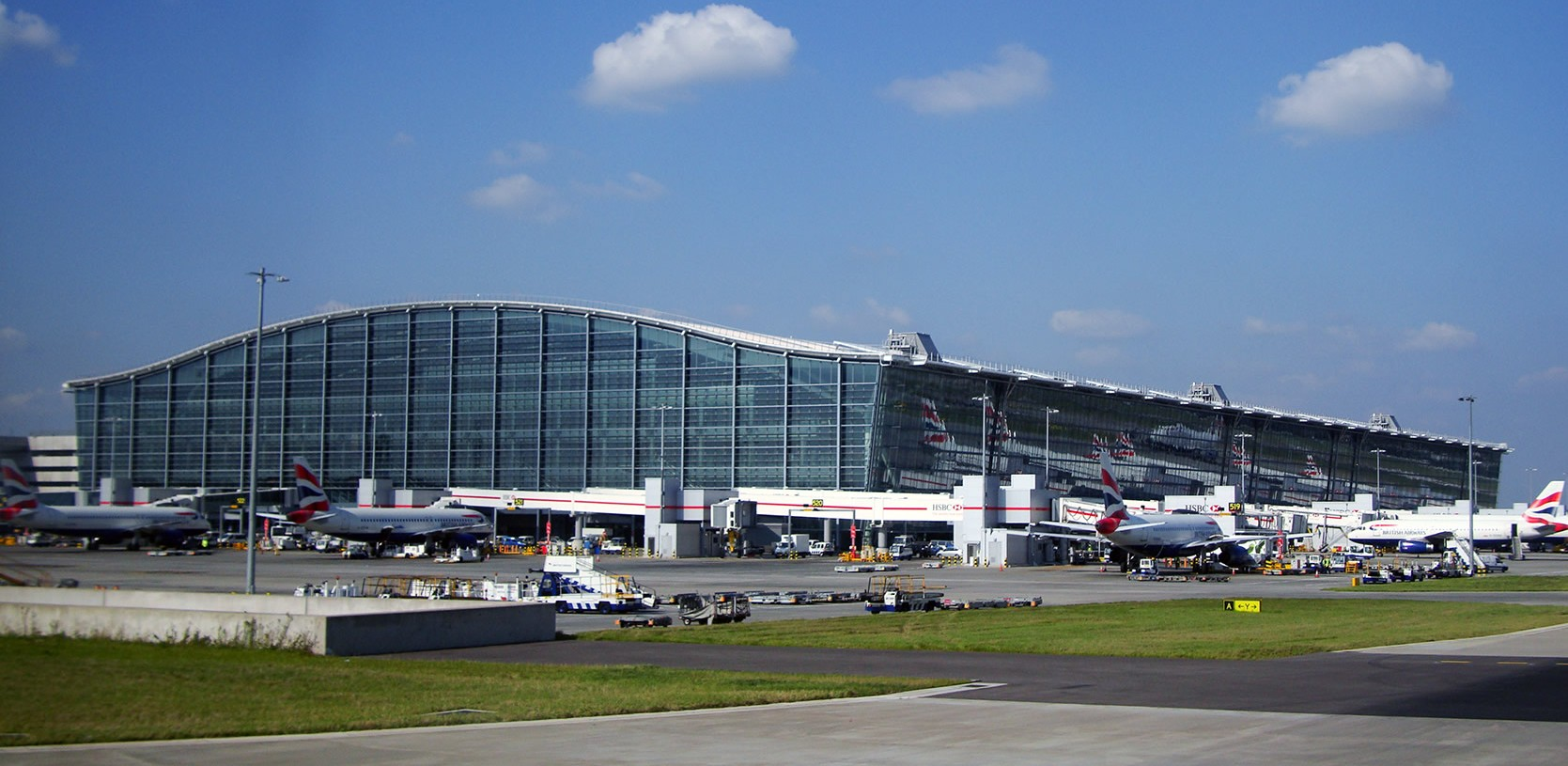
Heathrow Terminal 5

Michael Jeremy Pugh Davies CBE RIBA FRSA FRGS FICPD (born 25 January 1942) is a British architect. He was a founding partner of the Richard Rogers Partnership and a senior partner of the firm's current incarnation, RSHP.

== Early life and education ==
Mike Davies was born in Wales in 1942. His father was a geographer, and he travelled extensively with him as a child. He was educated at Highgate School, the Northern Polytechnic and the Architectural Association School of Architecture in London, before graduating with a master's degree in urban design from UCLA in 1970.

== Career ==
Mike Davies started his career at Airstructures Design in London while studying at the Architectural Association. Following his master's degree at UCLA he co-founded Chrysalis Architects in the USA, a firm specialising in lightweight structures. He joined the partnership between Richard Rogers and Renzo Piano in 1971, shortly after they won the commission to design the Pompidou Centre in Paris, and later went on to become one of the founding directors of the Richard Rogers Partnership in 1977. He has worked with the firm ever since.

In 2010 he was appointed a Chevalier of the Order of the Légion d’honneur by French President Nicolas Sarkozy. Davies is known for always dressing in red.

Rogers Stirk Harbour was reorganised in 2015 and Davies stepped down from his role as a partner in the company on 31 December 2015. He was to continue working for them in a part-time capacity.

== Selected projects ==
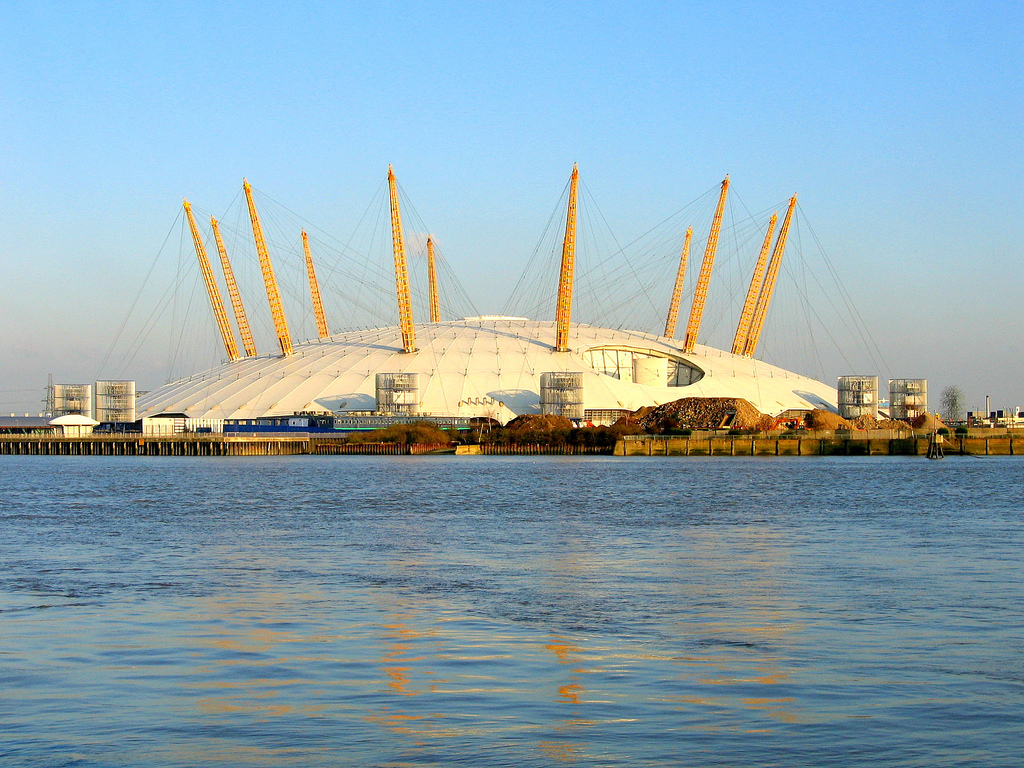
The Millennium Dome

- Pompidou Centre, Paris
- IRCAM (Institut de Recherche et Coordination Acoustique/Musique), Paris
- Lloyd's Building, London
- Millennium Dome, London
- Heathrow Terminal 5, London
