= One Park Taipei =

- 元利信義聯勤
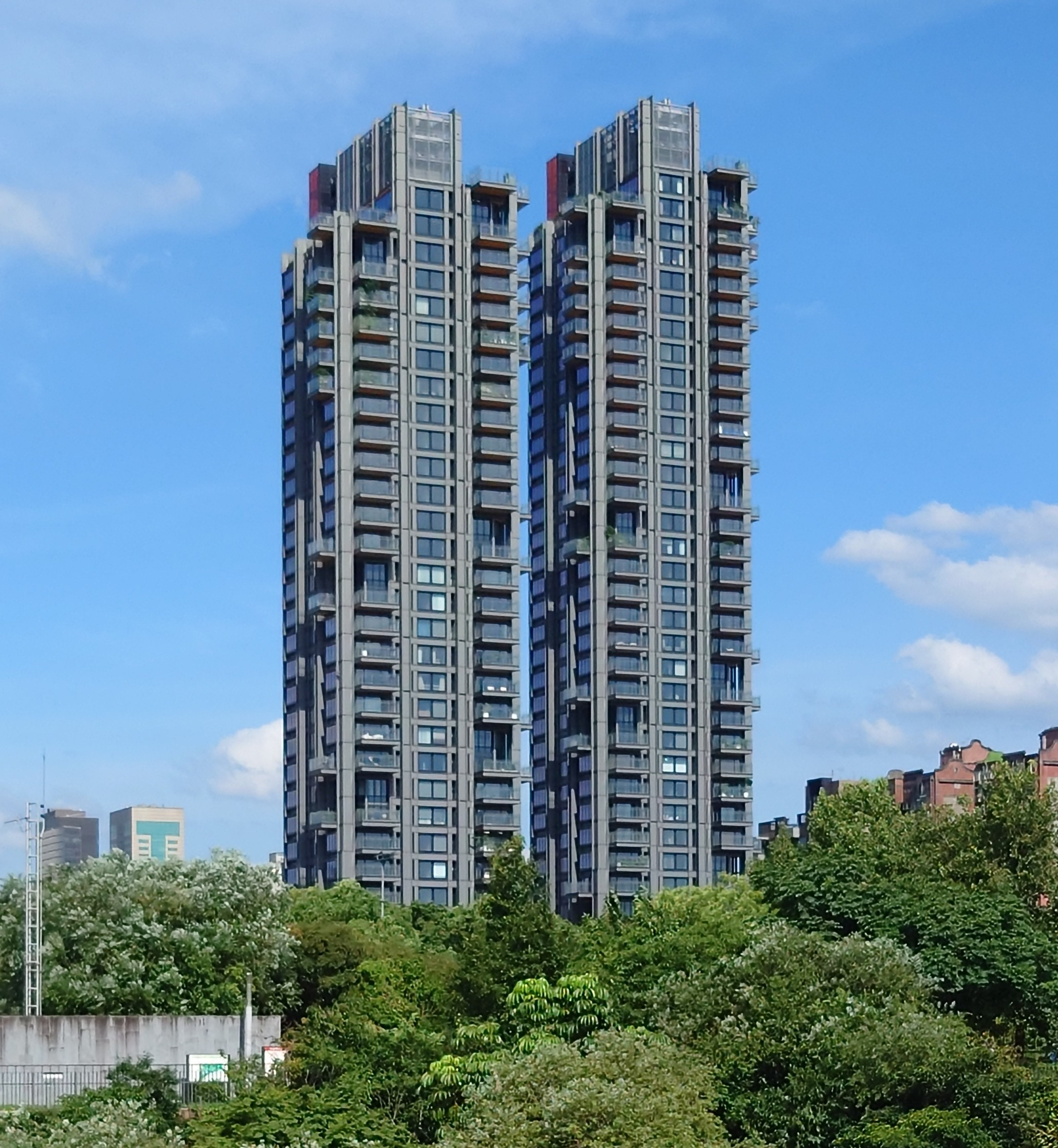
- Interactive map of the One Park Taipei area

General information
- Status: Completed
- Type: Residential
- Location: No 55, Section 2, Jianguo South Road, Daan District, Taipei, Taiwan
- Coordinates: 25°2′0.1″N 121°35′46.49″E
- Construction started: 2012
- Completed: 2016

Height
- Roof: South Tower: 144.8 m (475 ft); North Tower: 130.3 m (427 ft)

Technical details
- Floor count: South Tower: 35; North Tower: 31

Design and construction
- Architect: Rogers Stirk Harbour + Partners

The One Park Taipei, also known as Da-An Tower (Chinese: 元利信義聯勤; pinyin: Yuánlì xìnyì lián qín), is a complex of residential twin skyscrapers in Daan District, Taipei, Taiwan. The South Tower has an architectural height of 144.8 m (475 ft) with 35 floors above ground, and the North Tower is 130.3 m (427 ft) with 31 floors above ground. The towers were designed by the British architectural firm Rogers Stirk Harbour + Partners, and were completed in 2016. The complex is adjacent to the Daan Forest Park.

== Awards ==
The complex has won several awards:

- CTBUH 2019 Award of Excellence: Best Tall Building 100-199 meters 2019 Award of Excellence
- International Design Excellence Awards
- International Design Awards (IDA): Gold in Interior Design / Exterior Lighting
- Spark Awards
- German Design Award: Special 2019

== See also ==
- List of tallest buildings in Taiwan
- List of tallest buildings in Taipei

== External List ==
- Official Website of One Park Taipei (in Chinese)
- Architizer article of One Park Taipei
- One Park Taipei Facebook Page on Facebook
