= Marco Goldschmied =

British architect (1944–2022)

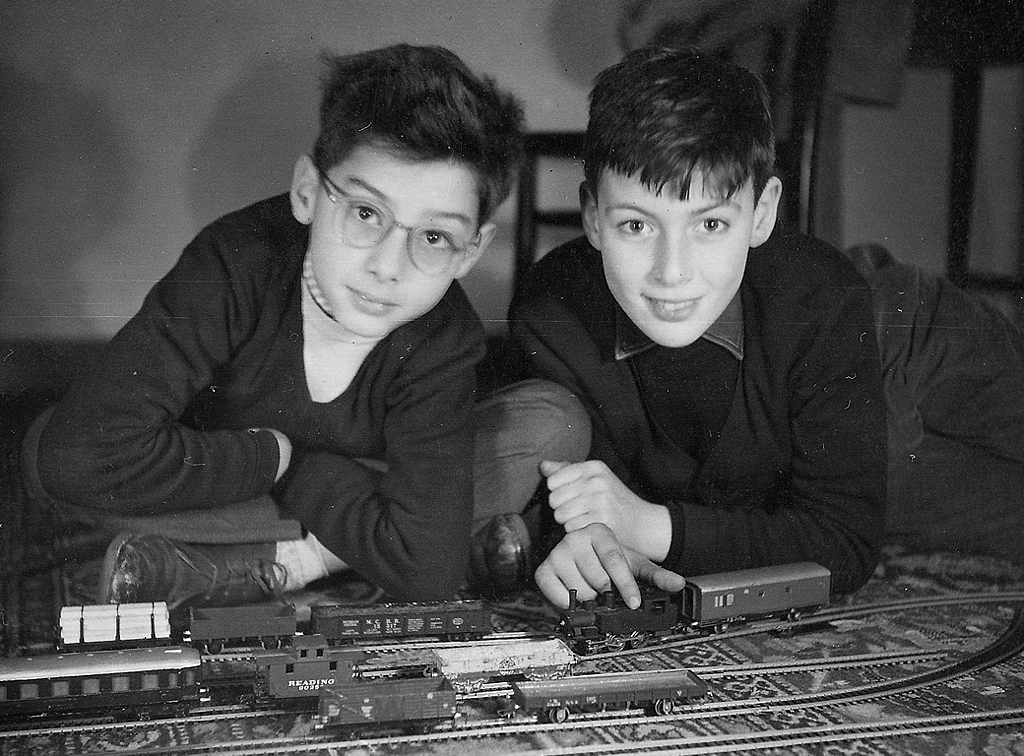
- Born: 28 March 1944; Harrogate, Yorkshire, England
- Died: 7 July 2022 (aged 78)
- Education: Architectural Association
- Occupation: Architect
- Practice: Richard Rogers Partnership

Marco Lorenzo Sinnott Goldschmied PPRIBA (28 March 1944 – 7 July 2022) was a British architect best known as co-founder and managing director of Richard Rogers Partnership. He was latterly involved with running the Marco Goldschmied Foundation and was a president of the Royal Institute of British Architects. In 1998, he founded the Stephen Lawrence Prize alongside Doreen Lawrence, in association with the RIBA.

== Career ==
Goldschmied trained at the Architecture Association where he met two future partners, Mike Davies and John Young.

In 1971, he was an associate partner of the Piano + Rogers architecture practice, which was established to design the competition-winning Centre Georges Pompidou.

Goldschmied was co-founder of the Richard Rogers Partnership with Richard Rogers, Davies, and Young in 1977, becoming managing director in 1984, and was involved in many of the major projects undertaken by the practice. He left in 2004, and the practice became Rogers Stirk Harbour + Partners in 2007.

Goldschmied set up the Marco Goldschmied Foundation, which established the RIBA Stephen Lawrence Prize in 1998 and rewards the best architecture projects with a construction budget of less than £1 million.

Goldschmied was President of the RIBA from 1999 to 2001, during which time he initiated the rebranding of the institute.

== Personal life ==
Son of British Elinor Sinnott and Italian Guido Goldschmied, Goldschmied was born in Harrogate, Yorkshire, on 28 March 1944, and moved to Trieste, Italy in 1946, during the Allied Military Government – Free Territory of Trieste. Following the death of his father in 1955, he returned to London with his mother in 1956. He married Andrea Halvorsen in 1969, and they had five children together between 1971 and 1982.

Goldschmied died at home on 7 July 2022, at the age of 78. He had been living with lung cancer for over a year. He was survived by his five children and numerous grandchildren.

== Notable buildings ==
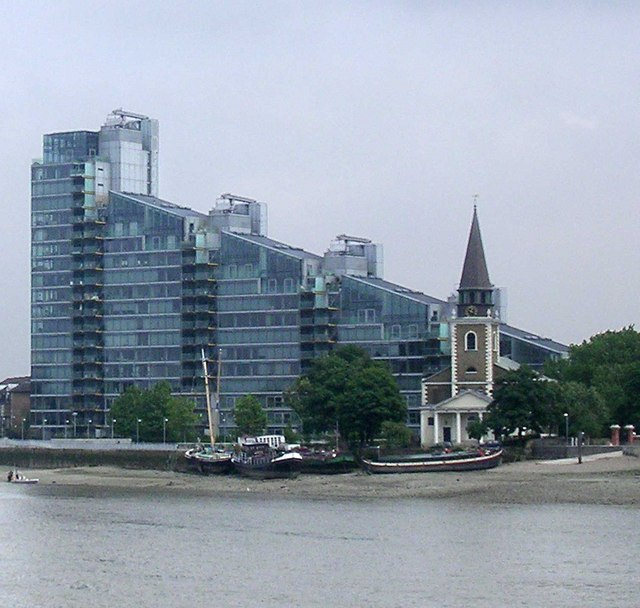
Montevetro Building, Battersea, London

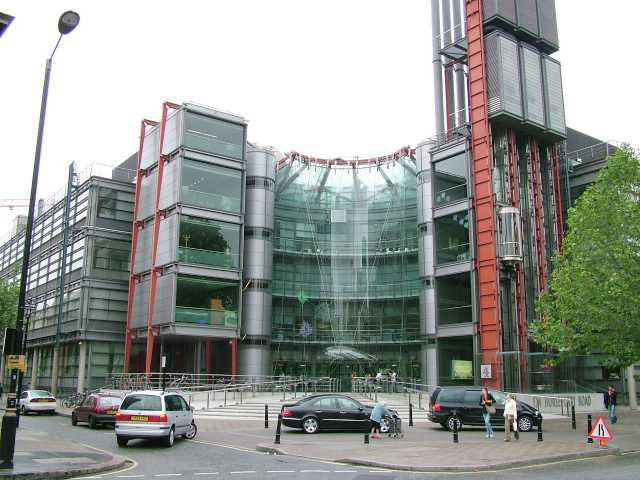
Channel 4 headquarters, London

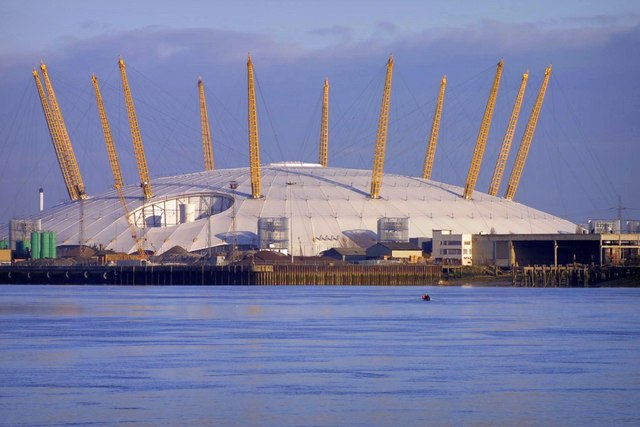
Millennium Dome at Greenwich, London

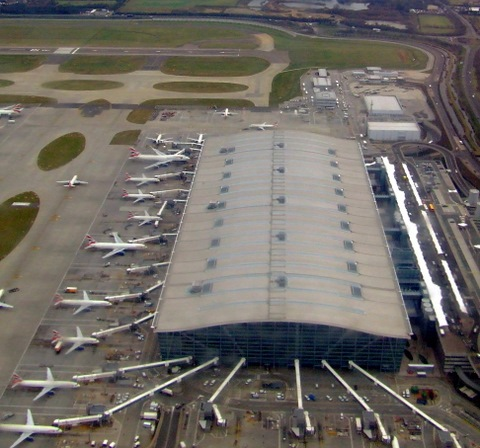
Heathrow Airport T5
