= Lè Architecture =

Office building in Taipei, Taiwan

- 砳建築
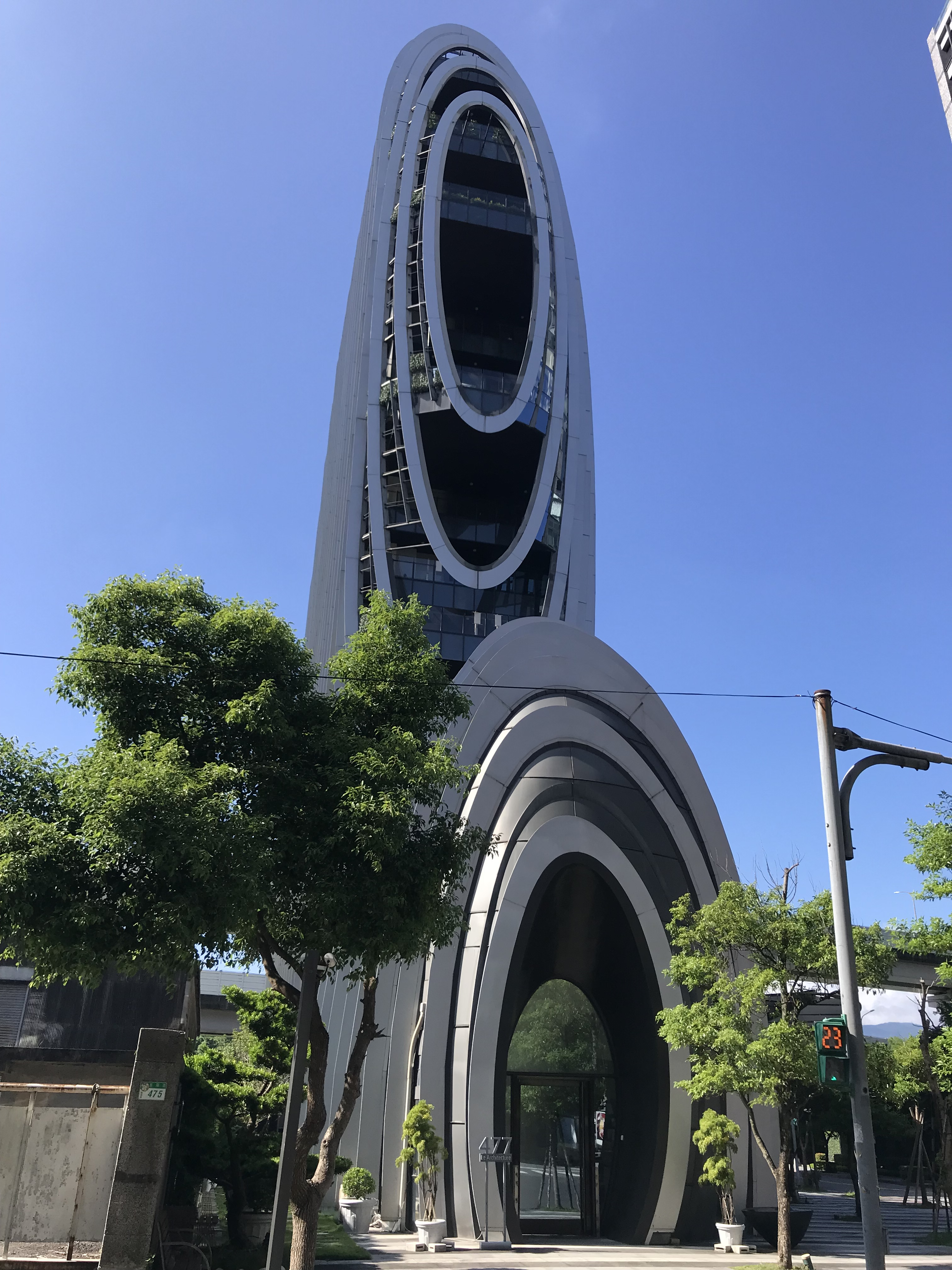
- Interactive map of the Lè Architecture area

General information
- Status: Completed
- Type: Office
- Location: No.477 Chongyang Road, Nangang District, Taipei, Taiwan
- Coordinates: 25.06021°N 121.61094°E
- Construction started: 2014
- Completed: 2017

Height
- Roof: 71.55 m (234.7 ft)

Technical details
- Floor count: 18
- Floor area: 11,449 m^{2} (123,240 sq ft)

Design and construction
- Architect: Aedas

The Lè Architecture (Chinese: 砳建築; pinyin: Lè jiànzhú) is an office building located in Nangang District, Taipei, Taiwan. The building has an architectural height of 71.55 m (234.7 ft) with 18 floors above ground and a floor area of 11,449 m^{2} (123,240 sq ft). The building was designed by the international architectural firm Aedas and was completed in 2017. The building has received a LEED Gold energy label.

== Design ==
Situated by the Keelung River in the fast-emerging southeastern district of Nangang in Taipei, Lè Architecture aims to convey traditional Taiwanese culture of roundness, strength and elegance with a modern twist by using an egg-shaped exterior design, which was inspired from the small pebbles in the Keelung River. Aiming to minimise energy demands, the building employs several sustainable features, such as a green façade that can lower the interior temperature by acting as a shade to reduce heat gain. Furthermore, natural light is allowed to enter the building by the use of vertical aluminium fins to control the amount of sunlight streaming through the windows. The trees planted in the exterior aims to act as air filters for the building.

== Awards ==
- CTBUH Award 2019: Best Tall Building under 100 meters 2019 Award of Excellence
- Architizer A+ Popular Choice Awards 2018

== See also ==
- One Park Taipei
- Tao Zhu Yin Yuan
- Nangang District, Taipei
- Aedas
