= Center 66 =

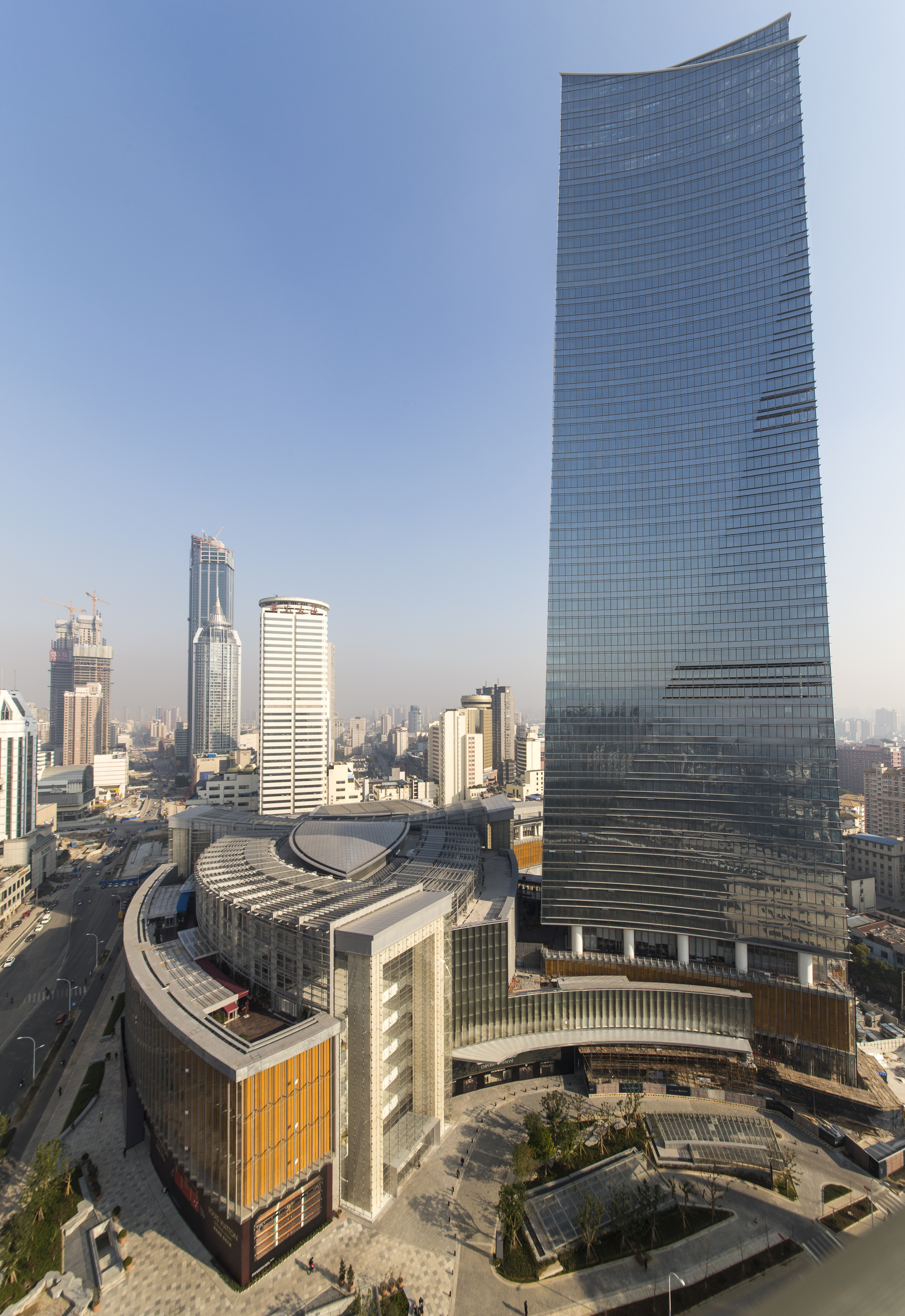
- A view of Center 66 Wuxi in China
- Interactive map of the Center 66 area

General information
- Type: Office and retail
- Location: 139 Renmin Road, ZhongShan Lu, Chong'an District, Wuxi, China
- Coordinates: 31°34′30.4″N 120°17′45.6″E
- Completed: 2014

Height
- Roof: 850 ft (259.1 m)

Technical details
- Floor count: 44
- Floor area: 376,800 m^{2} (4,056,000 ft^{2})

Design and construction
- Architect: Aedas
- Developer: Hang Lung Properties
- Structural engineer: Meinhardt

Center 66, developed by Hang Lung Properties, is located in Chong'an District, the central business district of Wuxi, close to the junction of Zhongshan Lu and Renmin Zhong Lu, the city's two busiest commercial streets. It is a mixed-use development consists of office and retail. The retail component was opened in late 2013.

The project includes the preserved cluster of historical buildings from the Ming Dynasty known as the Chenghuang Temple Precinct at the heart of a large public plaza within the development.

Wuxi Center66 currently has a number of world-renowned fashion brand jewelry and watch stores including Hermes, Louis Vuitton, Gucci, Bvlgari, Cartier, Tiffany, Rolex, Vacheron Constantin, Breguet, Blancpain, etc. In 2023, Wuxi Center66 annual sales will exceed RMB 5 billion.
