= Pxmart Headquarters =

Skyscraper office building in Zhongshan District, Taipei, Taiwan

Pxmart Headquarters 全聯企業總部大樓
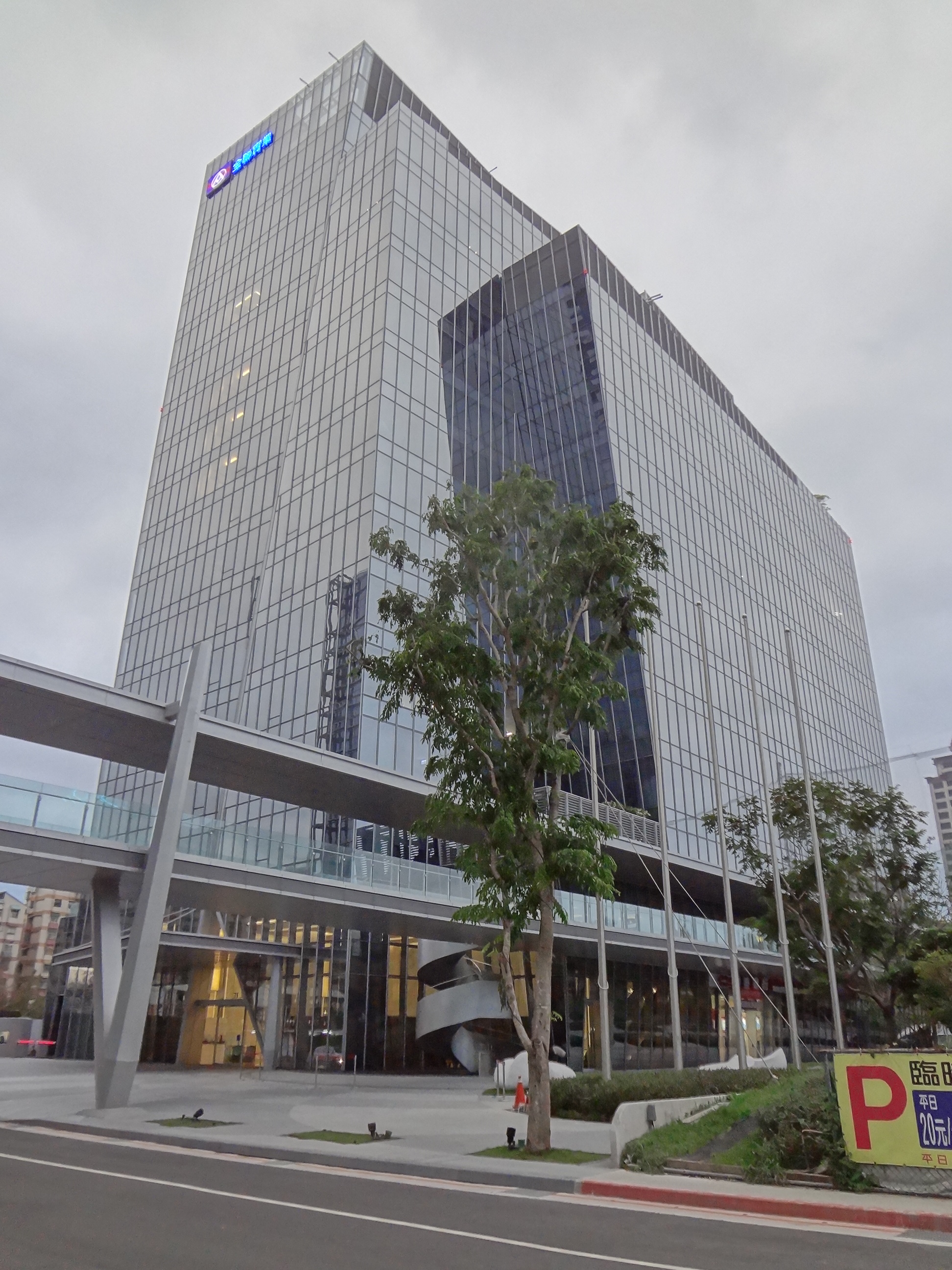
- Interactive map of the Pxmart Headquarters 全聯企業總部大樓 area

General information
- Status: Completed
- Type: Office building
- Classification: Office
- Location: No. 33, Jingye 4th Road, Zhongshan District, Taipei, Taiwan
- Coordinates: 25.08088646407767°N 121.56102147877601°E
- Construction started: 2011
- Completed: 2013

Height
- Roof: 358 ft (109 m)

Technical details
- Floor count: 22

The Pxmart Headquarters (Chinese: 全聯企業總部大樓) is a 22-floor, 358 ft (109 m) skyscraper office building completed located in Zhongshan District, Taipei, Taiwan that serves as the corporate headquarters of the Taiwanese supermarket chain PX Mart.

== See also ==
- List of tallest buildings in Taiwan
- List of tallest buildings in Taipei
- PX Mart
