= Christian Candy =

British luxury property developer (born 1974)

- Born: Christian Peter Candy; 31 July 1974 (age 52)
- Education: Priory Preparatory School; Epsom College; King's College London
- Occupation: Property developer
- Spouses: Emily Crompton (m. 2010)
- Children: 2
- Relatives: Nick Candy (brother)

Christian Peter Candy (born 31 July 1974) is a British luxury property developer. He was estimated to share a joint net worth of £1.5 billion in the Estates Gazette rich list 2010 along with his brother Nick Candy, placing them at position 52 in the list of the richest property developers in the United Kingdom.

== Early life ==
Born in London to a Greek-Cypriot mother and English father, Candy was privately educated at Priory Preparatory School and Epsom College in Surrey. He later studied for a business management degree at King's College London but did not graduate.

== Career ==
In 1995, he bought his first property along with his brother Nick Candy, a one-bedroom flat in Redcliffe Square, Earl's Court, London. Using a £6,000 loan from their grandmother, the brothers renovated the £122,000 apartment while living in it. Eighteen months later they sold it for £172,000, making a £50,000 profit.

In their spare time between 1995 and 1999, the brothers began renovating flats and working their way up the property ladder. Eventually they were able to give up their day jobs where Nick worked in advertising for J. Walter Thompson and Christian for investment bank Merrill Lynch and established Candy & Candy in 1999, of which Nick is CEO.

The brothers collaborated on the One Hyde Park development in London, but have operated separate businesses for a number of years. In June 2018, Candy & Candy was renamed Candy Property in order to reinforce Nick Candy's sole ownership of the business and to align with his wider portfolio of companies. In 2004, Christian established CPC Group in Guernsey, to specialise in high-end residential developments around the world. Some of their more high-profile developments, however, have been in London.

=== Gordon House ===
Candy agreed to purchase Gordon House from the Royal Hospital Chelsea in 2012. He exchanged contracts, consisting of two lease agreements for £20 million and £48 million. Christian began elaborate subterranean building works, including a 60 ft swimming pool and a cinema. Even though he had not completed on the purchase, the start of the works triggered a rule that the purchase had been "substantially performed", so he had to pay the SDLT levy. He decided not to move in, despite having paid £27.4 million of the price, and gave it to his brother Nick, who finished the works and completed on the purchase — at which point he became liable to pay the tax again.

=== Lawsuit ===
In 2016 and 2017, Nick and Christian Candy were involved in high-profile litigation in the High Court in London. Mark Holyoake claimed in the High Court action that the Candy Brothers had used threats against him and his family to extort total repayments of £37m against a £12m loan. The Candys were cleared of extortion. Mr Justice Nugee said he had found that none of Holyoake's claims to be true, and that there "had been no undue duress, influence, intimidation or unlawful interference with economic interests."

In June 2018, following another application by Holyoake, the Court of Appeal rejected his bid challenging the high court ruling in December 2017. Lord Justice Richards concluded that Holyoake's arguments had "no real prospect of success", meaning Mr Justice Nugee's original decision in 2017 was affirmed.

== Personal life ==
Candy married Emily Crompton, socialite and former nightclub hostess, in a lavish ceremony in 2010. They had twins born in 2013. They live between UK and Monaco.
