= CPC Group =

Property company of the United Kingdom

The CPC Group is a luxury property development company headquartered in Guernsey, founded by brothers Nick Candy and Christian Candy.

== Background ==
The Candy brothers bought their first property, a one-bedroom flat in Redcliffe Square, Earl's Court, London. Using a £6,000 loan from their grandmother, the brothers renovated the £122,000 apartment while living in it. Eighteen months later they sold it for £172,000, making a £50,000 profit.

In their spare time between 1995 and 1999, the brothers began renovating flats and working their way up the property ladder. Eventually they were able to give up their day jobs where Nick worked in advertising for J. Walter Thompson and Christian for investment bank Merrill Lynch and established Candy & Candy in 1999, of which Nick is CEO. In June 2018, Candy & Candy was renamed Candy Property in order to reinforce Nick Candy's sole ownership of the business and to align with his wider portfolio of companies.

== Formation ==
In 2004, Christian established CPC Group in Guernsey, to specialise in high-end residential developments around the world. Some of their more high-profile developments, however, have been in London.

== Notable development projects ==
=== One Hyde Park (2004) ===
In 2004, the Candy brothers sought an investment partner to help them buy the site of Bowater House in Knightsbridge, with plans to demolish it and construct 86 luxury apartments.

After setting up a joint venture with Waterknights – a private company owned by the Prime Minister of Qatar – they purchased the site from Land Securities in 2005 for £150m. One Hyde Park was also financed by a £1.15 billion development loan from the German bank, Eurohypo, a successor to the defunct Dresdner Bank, which was led by Matthias Warnig, a long-term associate of Russian President Vladimir Putin.

They then hired the architect Richard Rogers to design the exterior, and used their own Candy & Candy to handle interior design. One Hyde Park: The Residences of Mandarin Oriental, London, was constructed in four years after obtaining planning permission in 2006, with the finished development housing three commercial units: Rolex, McLaren Automotive and Abu Dhabi Islamic Bank. Despite its name, the building's address is located at 68-114 Knightsbridge, London. In 2015, The Guardian obtained a leaked recording of a 2010 promotional video for One Hyde Park, which features Richard Rogers, Nick Candy and Christian Candy, and Stephen Smith, a tax advisor for the Candy Brothers, who demanded changes to the video to "improve the tax profile" to avoid an enquiry by Her Majesty's Revenue & Customs, which at the time was led by Ian Barlow, a former director of a Candy brothers company in the British Virgin Islands.

The One Hyde Park development officially launched in January 2011 and had a profound effect on the global real estate market, breaking a number of industry records as the most expensive residential development in the world. It was reported that the penthouse apartments alone fetched some of the highest prices on record. Since the development opened, apartments at the complex have been purchased by the superrich, including Viktor Kharitonin, a Russian billionaire and business partner of Roman Abramovich, Ukrainian oligarch Rinat Akhmetov, who bought a triplex penthouse in 2010 for £136 million, Anar Aitzhanova, a Kazakh singer whose husband was shot dead in 2004, and Ekaterina Fedun, the daughter of Russian billionaire and Lukoil shareholder Leonid Fedun. Other owners of flats in the bloc include Temur Akhmedov, the son of sanctioned Russian-Azeri oligarch Farkhad Akhmedov, whose $460 million superyacht is now frozen in Germany due to EU sanctions following Russia's invasion of Ukraine in February 2022. On 18 June 2022, The Telegraph reported that Alexander Ponomarenko, a sanctioned Russian oligarch accused of purchasing a palace on behalf of President Vladimir Putin, is the owner of an apartment at One Hyde Park valued at £60 million.

=== NoHo Square (2006) ===
In 2006, the site of the former Middlesex Hospital was purchased for £175m by Project Abbey (Guernsey) Holdings Ltd – an investment consortium which included Kaupthing Bank, the now defunct Icelandic bank, and was led by the CPC Group. In February 2007, the brothers applied to Westminster City Council for planning permission to redevelop the 1.2 hectare (3 acre) site into a mixed use development of several hundred new residential units and office space. The plans were met with strong criticism from local residents over the Candy's choice of NoHo Square as the name for the new development.

Planning permission for NoHo Square was granted in November 2007; however, the completion of demolition of the hospital in 2008 coincided with the collapse of Kaupthing due to the 2008 financial crisis. Kaupthing was the largest shareholder in the Guernsey-based consortium which bought the Middlesex site from University College Hospital in 2006, and with the bank in administration, the NoHo Square development stalled. As a result of CPC Group being partners with Kaupthing in another property development over in the US, the Candy brothers were able to transfer their equity stake in NoHo Square to the bank and in exchange take full control of the US development.

=== Chelsea Barracks (2007) ===
In April 2007, the CPC Group acquired the Chelsea Barracks in a joint venture with Qatari Diar, part of the Qatar government's investment arm. In what is believed to be Britain's costliest residential property deal, the Candy brothers and the Qatari government bought the 12.8-acre site from the Ministry of Defence for £959m.

In 2010, the CPC Group brought an £81 million lawsuit against the Qatar Diar after the latter pulled out of the project, which was later settled out of court. Qatari Diar's decision to abandon the project came after pressure from Prince Charles, who criticised the plans and Qatar's Prime Minister and Chairman of Qatari Diar, Sheikh Hamad bin Jassim bin Jaber Al-Thani, calling the plans "brutish". Specifically, Charles was quoted as saying the Chelsea Barracks project would be “a gigantic experiment with the very soul of our capital city” and went on saying “it should be scrapped in favour of something more “old-fashioned”. High Court judge Mr. Justice Vos ruled that Charles’ intervention in the design of the project was immediately recognized and raised serious political issues that needed to be dealt with at the highest level, implying that Charles had intervened unlawfully.

=== Beverly Hills 9900 Wilshire development (2008) ===
In April 2007, the CPC Group purchased an eight-acre site in Beverly Hills, California, known as 9900 Wilshire, with their equity partners Kaupthing for a reported £250m.

CPC Group hired architect Richard Meier to design a condominium and retail complex in place of the former Robinsons-May department store. Victor Bardack of the Beverly Hills North Homeowners Association said: "To put two huge projects on the already-impacted intersection of Santa Monica and Wilshire boulevards is grossly detrimental to the community,[...] It'll be gridlock forever." The controversy stemmed from the Sheikh being part owner of a Middle Eastern newspaper that has been accused of being anti-Semitic and anti-American.

CPC Group served a written notice of default on Kaupthing shortly after. In the same month, the situation was made worse when the acquisition loan to the project from Credit Suisse became past due, and, additionally, it became increasingly difficult to get financing on the 250 condominiums that the original plans catered for. This was due to the collapse of the property market and banks pulling their funding. It was later reported that CPC Group – after negotiating full control of the development from Kaupthing – defaulted on a US$365.5 million bank loan.
