= List of public art in Knightsbridge =

This is a list of public art in Knightsbridge, a district in the City of Westminster and the Royal Borough of Kensington and Chelsea in London.

== City of Westminster ==
Image	Title / subject	Location and coordinates	Date	Artist / designer	Architect / other	Type	Designation	Notes
	Stags	Albert Gate 51°30′09″N 0°09′31″W	before 1839	Peter Turnerelli after Francesco Bartolozzi	Thomas Cubitt	Statues on gateposts	Grade II	Formerly stood at the Piccadilly entrance to the Deputy Ranger's Lodge in Green Park; Cubitt acquired the stags prior to the building's demolition. The gates and stone piers are twentieth-century replacements for Cubitt's originals of 1844–1845.
	Drinking fountain	Outside The Lanesborough 51°30′07″N 0°09′09″W	1860	?	—N/a	Drinking fountain	Grade II* (with old hospital building)	One of the earliest gifts of the Metropolitan Drinking Fountain Association; the hotel building behind was originally St George's Hospital, which was felt to be a particularly appropriate location for a drinking fountain.
	Pediment sculpture	Hyde Park Barracks, South Carriage Drive	c. 1878–1880	Thomas Earp	T. H. Wyatt (original setting); Basil Spence (current setting)	Pediment sculpture	—N/a	Salvaged from the riding school of the Victorian Knightsbridge Barracks, which were demolished in 1965.
	Busts Edward VII, Queen Alexandra, Lord Roberts, Lord Kitchener, Lord Salisbury and Archbishop Temple	55–91 Knightsbridge	c. 1902–1903	?	W. D. Caröe	Architectural sculpture	Grade II	The block was built on land belonging to the Ecclesiastical Commissioners by Caröe, their architect. The busts are in the pediments of the first-floor windows.
	Horse and Rider	Eresby House, Rutland Gate	c. 1933–1934	Eric Aumonier	T. P. Bennett & Son	Relief	—N/a	Another relief by Aumonier, in turquoise faience, is over the fireplace in the building's entrance hall.
	Triga	1 Knightsbridge Green (formerly Caltex House)	1958	Franta Belsky	Stone, Toms and Partners (1955–1957); Hurley, Robertson and Associates (2001 refurbishment)	Sculptural group	—N/a	A reinforced concrete sculpture with metal coating, commemorating Tattersall's racehorse auction yard which formerly stood on this site.
More images	The Rush of Green or The Bowater House Group	Edinburgh Gate 51°30′09″N 0°09′44″W	1959	Jacob Epstein	—N/a	Sculptural group	Grade II	Unveiled April 1961. A mother, father, child and dog, driven by the sound of Pan's pipes, rush towards Hyde Park. Epstein was adding the finishing touches to the group on the night he died.
	The Innocence of Childhood	Raphael Street	c. 1998	Richard Kindersley	Hurley, Robertson and Associates	Brick relief	—N/a	Showing a child's-eye view of a busy street, the relief has been severely compromised by the insertion of a window and a door in the wall.
	Shining Silence	Outside 100 Brompton Road, opposite Harrods	2003	Simon Hitchens		Sculpture	—N/a	Unveiled 26 September 2003. Made from 127 sheets of blue-tinted glass, with a red teardrop shape appearing to be suspended within.
	Hyde Park Gates	Edinburgh Gate 51°30′08″N 0°09′38″W	2010	Wendy Ramshaw	—N/a	Gates	—N/a	Commissioned from the artist and jeweller as part of the One Hyde Park residential development.
More images	Search for Enlightenment	One Hyde Park 51°30′09″N 0°09′41″W	2011	Simon Gudgeon	—N/a	Sculptures	—N/a	Unveiled 19 January 2012 to mark the first anniversary of One Hyde Park. The developers, Candy & Candy, had previously installed a cast of the work at Riverside Walk Gardens, Millbank, in 2011.

== Royal Borough of Kensington and Chelsea ==
Image	Title / subject	Location and coordinates	Date	Artist / designer	Architect / other	Type	Designation	Notes
	Pediment	Harrods, Brompton Road	c. 1903–1905	John Broad	C. W. Stephens	Architectural sculpture	Grade II*	A figure of Britannia enthroned, with figures either side of her offering her a pot (on the left) and a bunch of fruit (on the right), with Harrods's motto OMNIA OMNIBUS UBIQUE ('Everything for everybody, everywhere') inscribed below.
	Caryatids	4a and 5 Sloane Street, at the corner with Basil Street	c. 1904–1907	?	Frank Chesterton	Architectural sculpture	Grade II	The figures form part of a Mannerist doorcase described by the National Heritage List for England as "unusually flamboyant".
	Façade sculpture	Jumeirah Carlton Tower Hotel, south façade	1961	Elisabeth Frink	Michael Rosenhauer	Reliefs	—N/a	Eighteen curved, non-geometric shapes in copper set between three columns. Variously titled Four Season or Bird Forms, this early work of Frink's dissatisfied her soon after its completion and she came to repudiate it.
	Memorial to the victims of the 1983 Harrods bombing	Harrods	1985	George Cook		Stele and plaque	—N/a	The memorial to the police officers killed erected by the Police Memorial Trust, that of the civilians killed by the borough council.

== Bibliography ==
- Cavanagh, Terry (2023). Public Sculpture of Kensington and Chelsea with Westminster South-West. Public Sculpture of Britain. Vol. 22. Watford: Public Statues and Sculpture Association. ISBN 978-1-8383976-2-3.
