= Setiya =

Setiya is a surname. Notable people with the surname include:

- Kieran Setiya, British philosopher
- Suneil Setiya, British hedge fund manager
