= Nick Candy =

British luxury property developer and politician (born 1973)

Treasurer of Reform UK
- Incumbent
- Assumed office 10 December 2024
- Leader: Nigel Farage
- Preceded by: Mehrtash A'Zami

Personal details
- Born: Nicholas Anthony Christopher Candy; 23 January 1973 (age 53)
- Party: Reform UK (2024–present)
- Other political affiliations: Conservative Party (until 2024)
- Spouse: Holly Valance (m. 2012; sep. 2025)
- Relations: Christian Candy (brother)
- Children: 2
- Education: University of Reading (BSc)
- Occupation: Property developer

Nicholas Anthony Christopher Candy (born 23 January 1973) is a British businessman and politician, who has been the treasurer of Reform UK since December 2024. He was estimated to share a joint net worth of £1.5 billion in the Estates Gazette rich list 2010 along with his brother Christian Candy, placing them at position 52 in the list of the richest property developers in the United Kingdom.

== Early life and education ==
Born in London to a Greek-Cypriot mother and English father, he was privately educated at Priory Preparatory School and Epsom College in Surrey. He graduated from the University of Reading with a degree in human geography.

== Business career ==
In 1995, he bought his first property along with his brother Christian Candy, a one-bedroom flat in Redcliffe Square, Earl's Court, London. Using a £6,000 loan from their grandmother, the brothers renovated the £122,000 apartment while living in it. Eighteen months later they sold it for £172,000, making a £50,000 profit.

In their spare time between 1995 and 1999, the brothers began renovating flats and working their way up the property ladder. Eventually they were able to give up their day jobs where Nick worked in advertising for J. Walter Thompson and Christian for investment bank Merrill Lynch and established Candy & Candy in 1999, of which he is CEO. They formed the CPC Group in 2004 and collaborated on their One Hyde Park scheme in London.

The brothers now operate separate independent businesses. In June 2018, Candy & Candy was renamed Candy Property in order to reinforce Nick Candy's sole ownership of the business and to align with his wider portfolio of companies.

=== Candy Ventures ===
In recent years Nick Candy has diversified his interests outside of real estate and developed a portfolio of global investments (often in high-tech, leading-edge technology) through his private investment fund Candy Ventures. Candy Ventures, alongside Qualcomm Ventures, was reported to have led a $37 million funding round for a leading augmented reality and computer vision company. Candy Ventures acquired the intellectual property assets of leading augmented reality start-up Blippar in January 2019.

The website for Candy Ventures lists 18 investments within the companies portfolio, including Blippar, UK fashion house Ralph & Russo and data processing company Hanzo Archives. Nick Candy is currently in dispute with Ralph & Russo, which filed for bankruptcy in March 2018, in the UK High Court over the terms of a £17 million loan given by Candy Ventures to the company.

Candy Ventures acquired a stake in Blippar and another tech start-up, Crowdmix, after both companies were placed into administration. The takeovers were both facilitated by Paul Appleton, who worked as the administrator for the two companies and was appointed administrator in the Ralph & Russo bankruptcy. Their portfolio includes mining investments in the Runruno gold mine in the Philippines, which has faced opposition from human rights groups after the demolition of local communities in 2012, which caused injuries to six local people. In May 2022, The Times reported that Candy Ventures was considering a bid to buy The Hut Group, though journalist Oliver Shah was sceptical, pointing to "a series of disastrous investments in tech start-ups" and "no record of big acquisitions". However, on 15 June 2022, Bloomberg reported that Candy Ventures had pulled out of the bidding process for The Hut Group.

In July 2022, his Luxembourg-registered investment vehicle, Candy Ventures SARL, sued Aaqua BV and its major shareholder, Robert Bonnier, for an alleged fraud. He claimed that Bonnier misled him about Aaqua, a false claim that Apple and LVMH are interested to invest in Aaqua, so asked the court to freeze Bonnier's assets and nullify the swap of his shares in Audioboom Group PLC, a podcast platform, with Aaqua. Later, the High Court issued a freezing order against Bonnier, but ordered that Candy Ventures had to obtain a £10 million bank guarantee to maintain the freezing order. In August 2022, the freezing orders were discharged. On 7 September 2022, Bonnier demanded £150 million in damages from Candy for falsely obtained freezing orders that turned his technology company into a credit risk.

=== Other ventures ===
In October 2018, it was reported that Nick Candy refinanced his penthouse at One Hyde Park with an £80 million mortgage from Credit Suisse in order to pursue rental opportunities. The property was reportedly valued in 2018 at £160 million.

In April 2021, Bloomberg reported that Candy had placed his penthouse on the market for £175 million. In August 2020, Candy also announced that his yacht, the Eleven Eleven, was up for sale for €59.5 million.

On 9 March 2022, Candy, a boyhood fan, confirmed he was planning a consortium bid to take over Chelsea Football Club after owner Roman Abramovich put the club up for sale following Russia's invasion of Ukraine. The sale process was halted the following day after Abramovich's assets, including the club, were frozen to stop him making money from Chelsea, but the UK government was open to considering a variation to its sanctions licence to allow a sale so long as Abramovich received no funds. On 25 March 2022, The Athletic reported that Candy's bid to acquire Chelsea had failed, despite support from South Korean firms Hana Financial and C&P Sports Group.

In 2023 Dubai World Trade Centre (DWTC) and Nick Candy's Candy Capital announced that they had formed a partnership to develop a “super-prime” real estate development in Dubai.

=== Lawsuit ===
In 2016 and 2017, Nick and Christian Candy were involved in high-profile litigation in the High Court in London. Mark Holyoake claimed in the High Court action that the Candy Brothers had used threats against him and his family to extort total repayments of £37m against a £12m loan. The Candys were cleared of extortion. Mr Justice Nugee said he had found that none of Holyoake's claims to be true, and that there "had been no undue duress, influence, intimidation or unlawful interference with economic interests."

In June 2018, following another application by Holyoake, the Court of Appeal rejected his bid challenging the high court ruling in December 2017. Lord Justice Richards concluded that Holyoake's arguments had "no real prospect of success", meaning Mr Justice Nugee's original decision in 2017 was affirmed.

== Political career ==
Nick Candy has donated over £270,000 to the Conservative Party.

In June 2020, The Guardian also reported that Candy had donated £100,000 to the Conservative Party in March 2020. In March 2021, The Times named Candy as the leader of fundraising for Shaun Bailey's London mayoral campaign. In February 2024, Candy was reported by The Independent to have praised Keir Starmer's Labour Party.

=== Treasurer of Reform UK ===
In December 2024, having left the Conservative Party, he was appointed treasurer of Reform UK by leader Nigel Farage.

Shortly after taking on the role, he arranged a meeting between Farage and billionaire Elon Musk at Mar-a-Lago, with the goal of securing a donation to the party from Musk.

Candy had links with Jeffrey Epstein. Nigel Farage said he had "no concerns" about Candy's appearance in the Epstein files.

== Personal life ==
On 29 September 2012, Candy married the Australian–British actress and musician Holly Valance in Beverly Hills, California, US. In November 2013 in London, they had their first child, a daughter, Luka Violet Toni. Their second daughter, Nova Skye Coco, was born in September 2017. In June 2025, it was reported that Candy and Valance had separated after 13 years of marriage.

On 8 April 2022, Candy and Valance were pictured with former US President Donald Trump and British politician Nigel Farage at Trump's Mar-a-Lago resort, with a tweet by Farage indicating that the group had dinner together. A report in The Times on 28 May 2022 indicated that Candy is also friends with comedians Jimmy Carr and David Walliams.

In 2026, Candy sold his property, Providence House, in Chelsea, London for a reported £265 million, believed to be the most expensive on record in London.
