= Suneil =

Suneil is a given name. Notable people with the name include:

- Suneil Anand (born 1956), Indian actor and film director
- Suneil Setiya, British hedge fund manager
