= Providence House, Chelsea =

Building in Chelsea, London

Gordon House
- Location within Greater London
- 51°29′7.76″N 0°9′31.42″W
- Location: Chelsea, West London, England

History
- Built: 1809

Site notes
- Architect: Thomas Leverton
- Governing body: Leasehold privately owned, Freehold owned by the Royal Hospital Chelsea

Listed Building – Grade II
- Official name: Gordon House
- Designated: 15 April 1969
- Reference no.: 1265844

Providence House, formerly Gordon House, is a large 19th-century detached house in Chelsea, London, SW3. The house is sited in two acres of the south west corner of the grounds of the Royal Hospital Chelsea. It was designed by Thomas Leverton for Colonel James Willoughby Gordon, known as Gordon House. The house became part of the Royal Hospital following Gordon's death in 1851, and was in 2012 purchased by Christian Candy, then gifted to his brother Nick Candy, who renamed it Providence House, making extensive renovations including a 14,000 sq ft basement. In 2026, the house became the most expensive house ever sold in the UK, possibly in the world, selling for £275 million, to Suneil Setiya, a hedge fund manager and co-founder of Quadrature Capital.

== History ==
The land on which Gordon House now stands was originally the site of Walpole House, the residence of Robert Walpole. After Walpole's death it was acquired by the Earl of Dunmore. Following Dunmore's death it was bought by merchant George Aufrere and was inherited by Aufrere's son-in-law, Lord Yarborough. The house was subsequently named for Lord Yarborough. Gian Lorenzo Bernini's sculpture Neptune and Triton stood in the octagon Summer house of Yarborough's house. Lord Yarborough sold the house to the British Government in 1808.

=== Soane and General Gordon ===
Royal Hospital, Stanford's Map of Central London 1897.

In 1807, the architect Sir John Soane had been made Clerk of Works of the Royal Hospital, and a new infirmary was proposed by the hospital's governor, General Sir David Dundas, in the following year. A site was not chosen until June 1810, with a proposal by the hospital's physician that the recently re-acquired Yarborough House could be converted into an infirmary.

Soane opposed this, finding the house unsuitable for the proposed 80 berths, and he suggested two designs for detached buildings. Soane's designs benefited from a southern view over the River Thames, with the river air thought to be of benefit to the health of patients. Unbeknownst to Soane, his proposed infirmary scheme had already been rendered impossible due to the lease of the site to Colonel Willoughby Gordon for the construction of a villa.

In 1809 Colonel Gordon had acquired an 80-year lease of what had been a part of the Yarborough House grounds, on which he intended to build his villa. The lease was just over £52 per annum and it was obtained on the understanding that he spend £3,500 on the construction of the villa. Gordon commissioned Thomas Leverton to design the villa even before the lease was granted, and pulled down an existing pavilion in preparation. Soane tried in vain to alter the decision and position of the proposed villa to accommodate his infirmary.

Soane opposed the construction of Gordon House as the reduction in the area occupied by Yarborough House was inadequate for the drying grounds and service buildings required for his infirmary. Soane was successful however in persuading Gordon to slightly alter his plans for a villa but the construction of the villa ultimately meant that Soane's plans for a new infirmary were never realised.

Gordon's villa, designed by the architect Thomas Leverton, is three storeys high, and stands on raised ground that once experienced panoramic views of the River Thames. In his capacity as public secretary to the Prince Frederick, Duke of York, Gordon once hosted a dinner for Alexander I of Russia, the Duchess of Oldenburg and the Duke at the house in 1814.

Gordon died at the house in 1851, and his 80-year lease expired in 1889. It was subsequently let to the Royal Military and Naval Exhibitions and was converted into a residence for the nurses of the infirmary two years later. It served as staff quarters from 1956 after being converted into four separate flats.

== 2012 sale and conversion ==
In April 2012 Gordon House was advertised for sale through the estate agents Savills for £75 million. It had never previously been available on the property market. Money subsequently raised by the sale has funded the renovation of the living quarters of the residents of the Royal Hospital.

The Financial Times reported that in the days immediately following the 2012 Russian presidential election three parties of Russian buyers were shown around the property by an estate agent from Savills. The Financial Times article discussed the sale of Gordon House and the attraction of prime London property to international investors in a time of global risk. The Savills agent, Jonathan Hewlett, said that "Buying a London house has become the stock reaction. Wherever there is political or economic unease, people instinctively head for the Monopoly board of prime central London addresses".

The architectural firm Paul Davis and Partners were hired by the Royal Hospital to obtain planning and listed building consent for the conversion of Gordon House and other buildings into a single family residence. The purchaser was legally obliged to construct a connecting building to provide underground access from the house as well as a spa and gymnasium complex (including a swimming pool) and bedrooms for four members of staff. Under the terms of sale the house can only be used as a private residence.

The landscaping of the Gordon House site, designed by Todd Longstaffe-Gowan, was described by the architects as enhancing the "setting to provide the unique prospect of a grand country estate in the heart of Chelsea". A private entrance to the house is located in Tite Street.

The house was eventually sold to the British property developer Christian Candy in 2012 for £75 million, and he gave it to his brother Nick Candy. The house was sold on a long lease, and ownership will again revert to the hospital in the future.

== 2026 Sale ==
The house, owned through Providence House LLP, was sold in 2026 for a reported £265 million, the highest price ever paid for a UK property. In April 2026, Suneil Setiya, hedge fund manager and co-founder of Quadrature Capital, was confirmed as the buyer.
