= Suneil Setiya =

UK-based hedge fund manager

- Born: 1973 (age 52–53)
- Education: Worcester College, Oxford
- Occupation: Hedge fund manager
- Known for: owner of Providence House, Chelsea
- Title: Co-founder, Quadrature Capital
- Relatives: Kieran Setiya (brother)

Suneil Setiya (born 1973) is a British hedge fund manager and a co-founder of Quadrature Capital. He is the owner of Providence House (formerly Gordon House) in Chelsea, purchased in 2026 for £275 million.

== Early life ==
He is the son of Raj and Jeannette Setiya, who died in 2025 in Anlaby. His brother is the philosopher Kieran Setiya.

Setiya was educated at Hymers College in Hull from 1981 to 1991, followed by a degree in physics from Worcester College, Oxford.

== Career ==
In 2008, Greg Skinner and Setiya, who had met while working for quantitative finance firm G-Research, co-founded Quadrature Capital.

== Personal life ==
In 2020, the Sunday Times Rich List estimated his net worth at £304 million. In 2021, he was in talks to buy a penthouse at One Hyde Park for US$153 million.

In 2024, he donated £4 million to the UK's Labour Party, via Quadrature.

In 2025, Setiya and Skinner were ranked first on the Sunday Times Giving List, donating £5.32 million per week towards tackling climate change.

In April 2026, Setiya was confirmed as the buyer of Providence House in Chelsea for more than £275 million.
