= The Rush of Green =

Sculpture by Jacob Epstein

Coordinates: 51.502412°N 0.162360°W

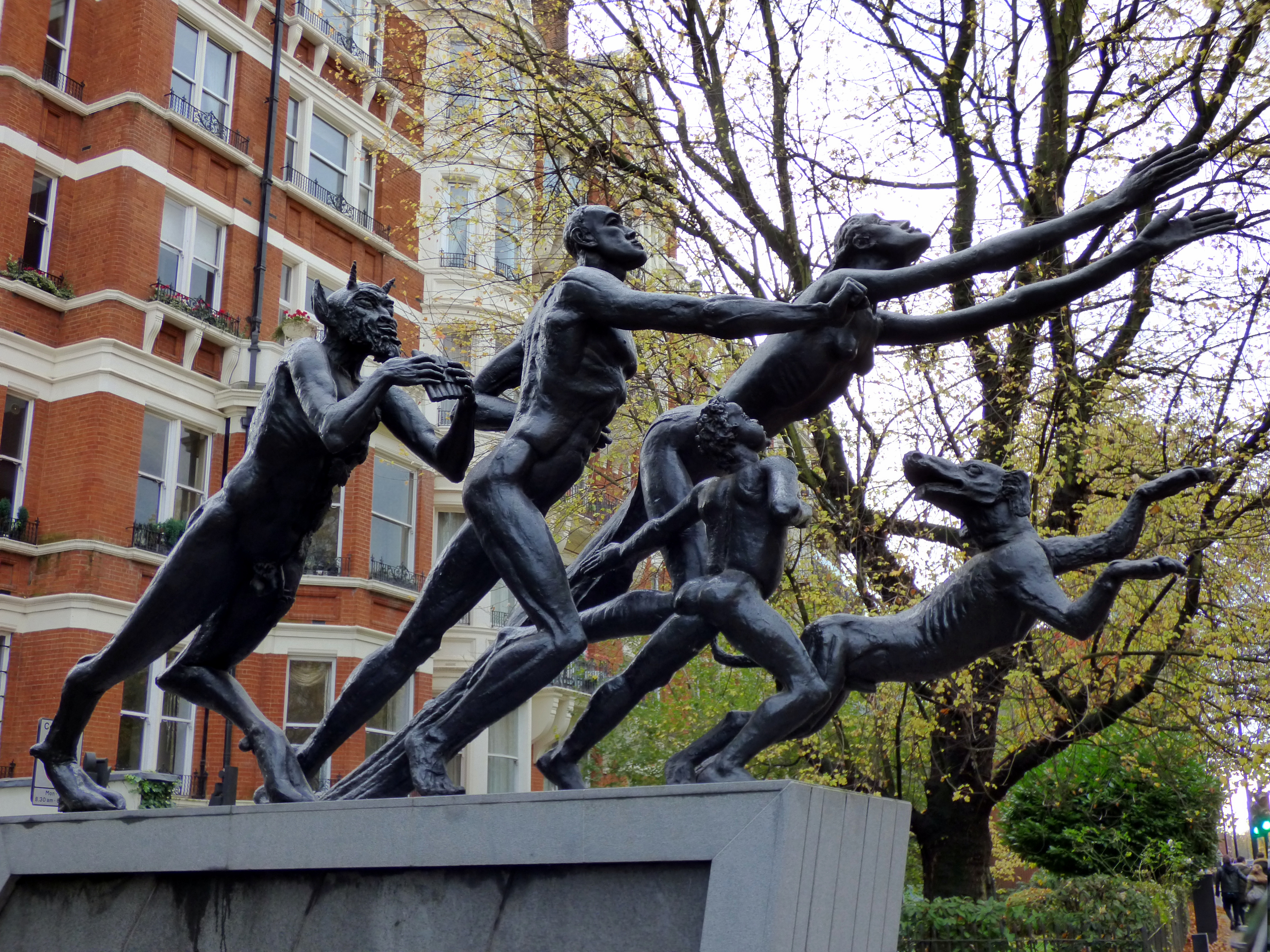
- The Rush of Green in 2017
- Artist: Sir Jacob Epstein
- Year: 1957–1959
- Type: Sculptural group
- Medium: Bronze
- Location: Junction of Edinburgh Gate and South Carriage Drive, Knightsbridge, London SW1X

Listed Building – Grade II
- Official name: The Pan Statue
- Designated: 16 January 2016
- Reference no.: 1431163

The Rush of Green, also known as Pan or The Bowater House Group, was the last sculpture completed by Jacob Epstein before his death at his home in Hyde Park Gate on 19 August 1959. The sculpture group includes a long-limbed family – father, mother, son and dog – rushing towards Hyde Park, encouraged by the Greek god Pan playing his pipes. It was cast in bronze posthumously and installed in 1961 on a plinth separating the carriageways of Edinburgh Gate beneath Bowater House. The sculpture was removed when Bowater House was demolished in 2006 and reinstalled near the building which replaced it, One Hyde Park, in 2010. The sculpture was granted Grade II listed status in January 2016, giving it legal protection against unauthorised alteration or removal.

The sculpture was commissioned by Harold Samuel in November 1957. He was the chairman of the Land Securities Investment Trust, and intended the statue to be sited beside the company's new office development at Bowater House, on the southern edge of Hyde Park. It was cast in bronze by Morris Singer and installed in April 1961 in the middle of Edinburgh Gate, a road that ran from Knightsbridge underneath the newly built Bowater House to South Carriage Drive. A maquette of the sculpture was exhibited in the foyer of the building.

The sculpture was removed when Bowater House was demolished in 2006 to be replaced by One Hyde Park and reinstalled in 2010 at the entrance to the relocated Edinburgh Gate, some distance to the west, still beside South Carriage Road, accompanied by new 15 metres (49 ft) bronze gates designed by Wendy Ramshaw.

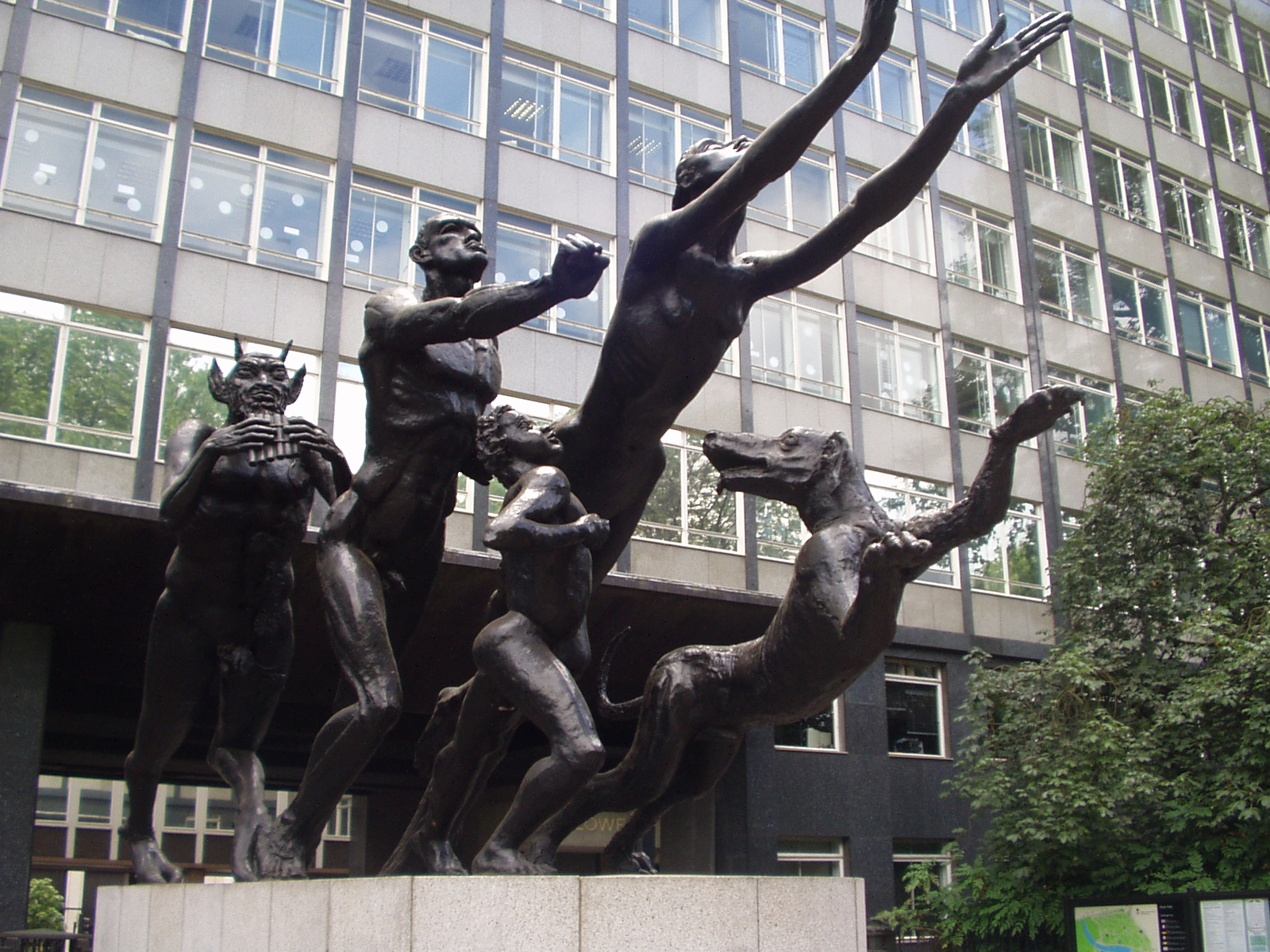
The sculpture in 2003, with Bowater House in the background

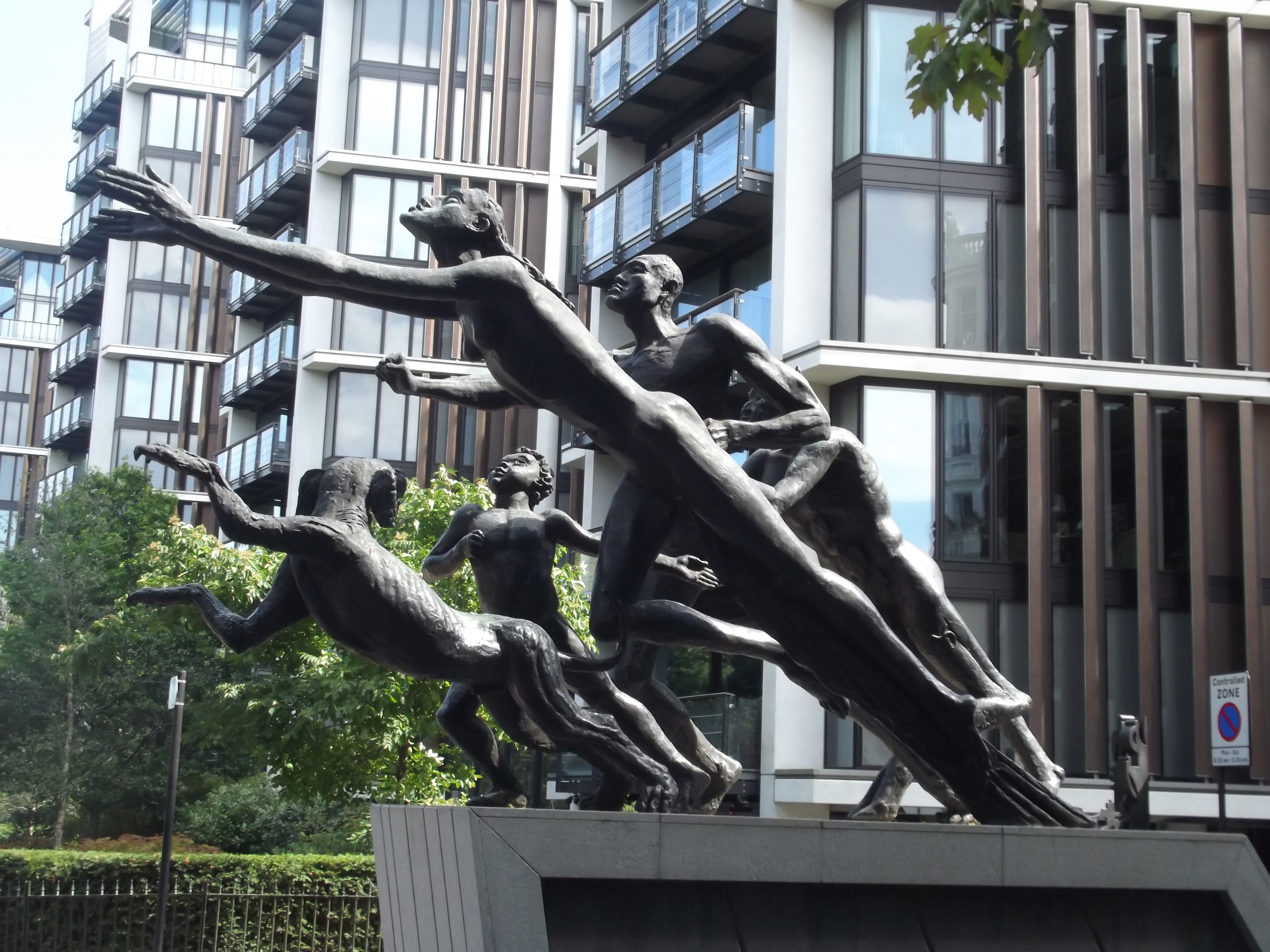
The sculpture in 2015, with One Hyde Park in the background

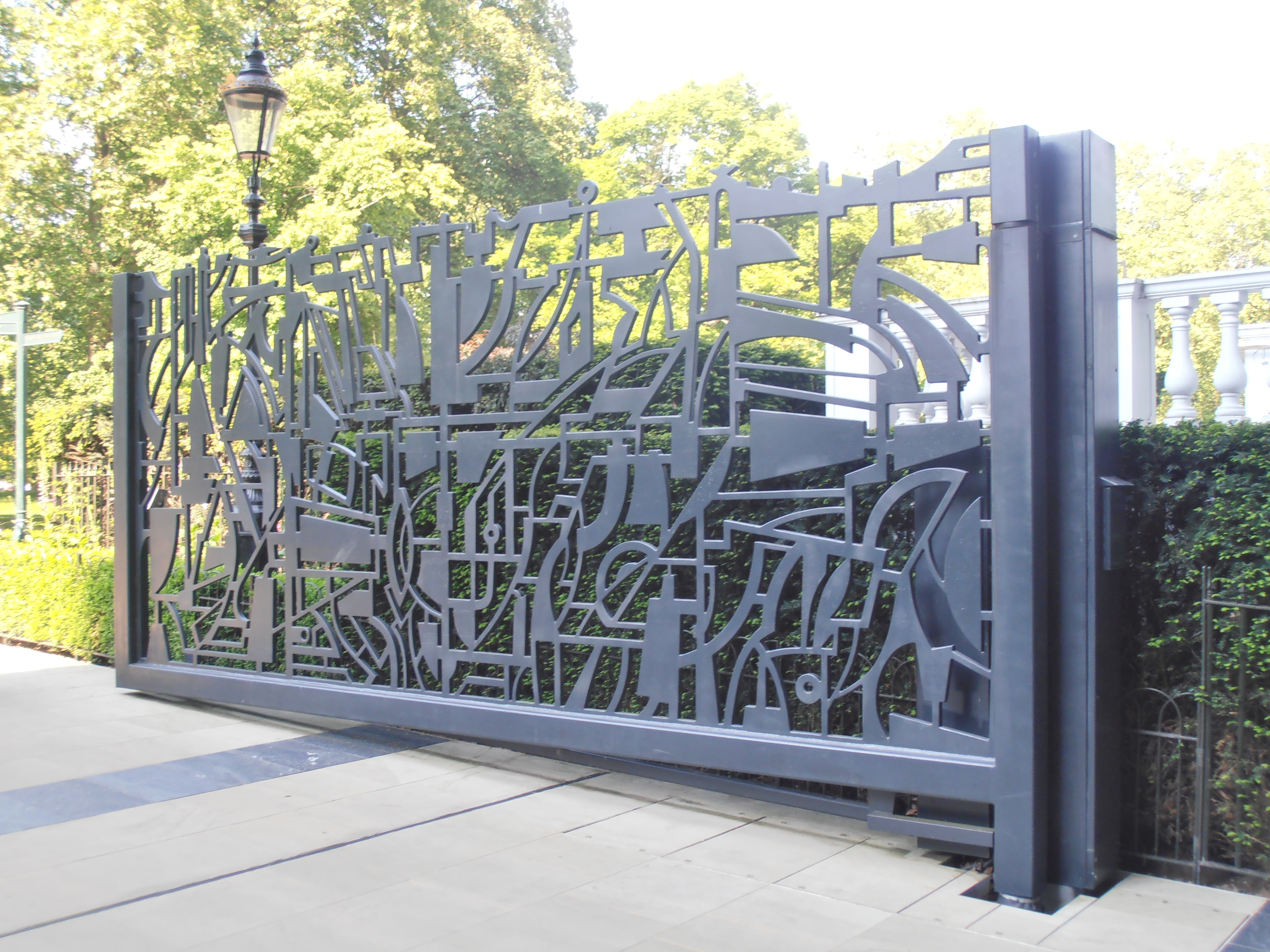
Hyde Park Gates (2010) by Wendy Ramshaw

== See also ==
- 1959 in art
- List of sculptures by Jacob Epstein
- Greek mythology in western art and literature
- List of public art in Knightsbridge
