= Bowater House =

Former office building in London

Coordinates: 51.5021°N 0.1607°W

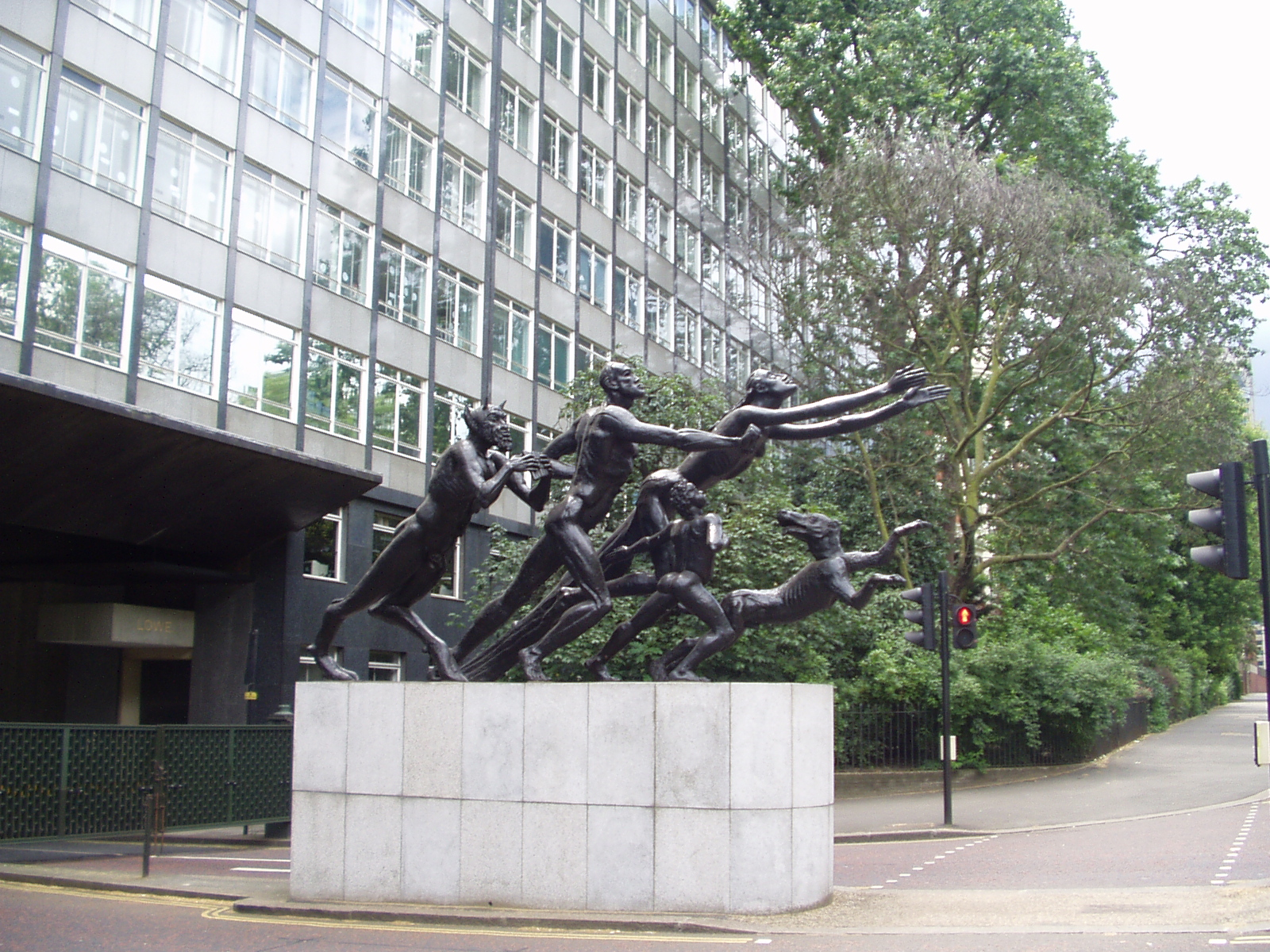
Bowater House in 2003

Bowater House was a 17-floor office block at 68 Knightsbridge in London SW1, completed in 1958. The building occupied a site between Knightsbridge and South Carriage Road, at the southern edge of Hyde Park. It was demolished in 2006 and redeveloped by Candy & Candy to create One Hyde Park.

== Construction ==
A redevelopment of the site had been proposed in the 1930s. The existing buildings were damaged by bombing during the Second World War and mostly demolished in 1942. The cleared site was ripe for redevelopment after the war, and was acquired by the Land Securities Investment Trust.

A new building was designed by architects Guy Morgan & Partners as part of a wider but ultimately unrealised plan to create a large rectangular roundabout to the south, similar to Parliament Square, which would have included a sunken pedestrian piazza surrounded by commercial buildings and office blocks. At the request of London County Council, the project included widening Knightsbridge, and creating a new dual-carriageway road beneath the building, named Edinburgh Gate after the Duke of Edinburgh, to provide access to Hyde Park and underground car parks.

The building included four main blocks: two slabs of offices oriented east-west to bridge the new road, with an 8-storey block facing the park to the north and a lower parallel block on pilotis facing Knightsbridge to the south, connected by two blocks running north-south to either side of Edinburgh Gate, with the taller one to the west including a tower reaching 17 storeys, some 52 metres (171 ft) high. The tower was lower than the skyscraper included in the original design, shortened during the planning process to reduce its visual impact when viewed from Hyde Park.

After clearing the site in 1956, construction started in 1957 and was completed in 1958. The buildings were constructed by Taylor Woodrow Construction, using a steel frame and concrete cast in situ, with the floor slabs having steel water pipes cast-in for heating and possibly cooling. The building was clad with polished granite, brick and glass, creating approximately 25,000 square metres (270,000 sq ft) of floor space. It was pre-let as the London headquarters of the Bowater Paper Corporation.

Harold Samuel, founder and chairman of Land Securities, commissioned a sculpture from Jacob Epstein: his last sculpture Rush of Green (also known as The Bowater House Group, The Return of Spring, The Family, or The Pan Group) was completed shortly before his death in 1959 and installed in 1961 on a plinth separating the carriageways beneath the building. A maquette of the sculpture was exhibited in the foyer of the building.

== Reception ==
Some critics considered the building to be a good example of modernist architecture, but others thought it ugly, blocky, and too heavy for its location beside the junction of Knightsbridge and Sloane Street. An anecdote reports Ludwig Mies van der Rohe passing the building in 1959 in a taxi with Ernő Goldfinger: Goldfinger gestured towards the building, saying "This is all your fault"; Van der Rohe replied "I was not the architect of that building".
