= Hahn Airport =

Airport in Rhineland-Palatinate, Germany

Hahn Airport Flughafen Hahn

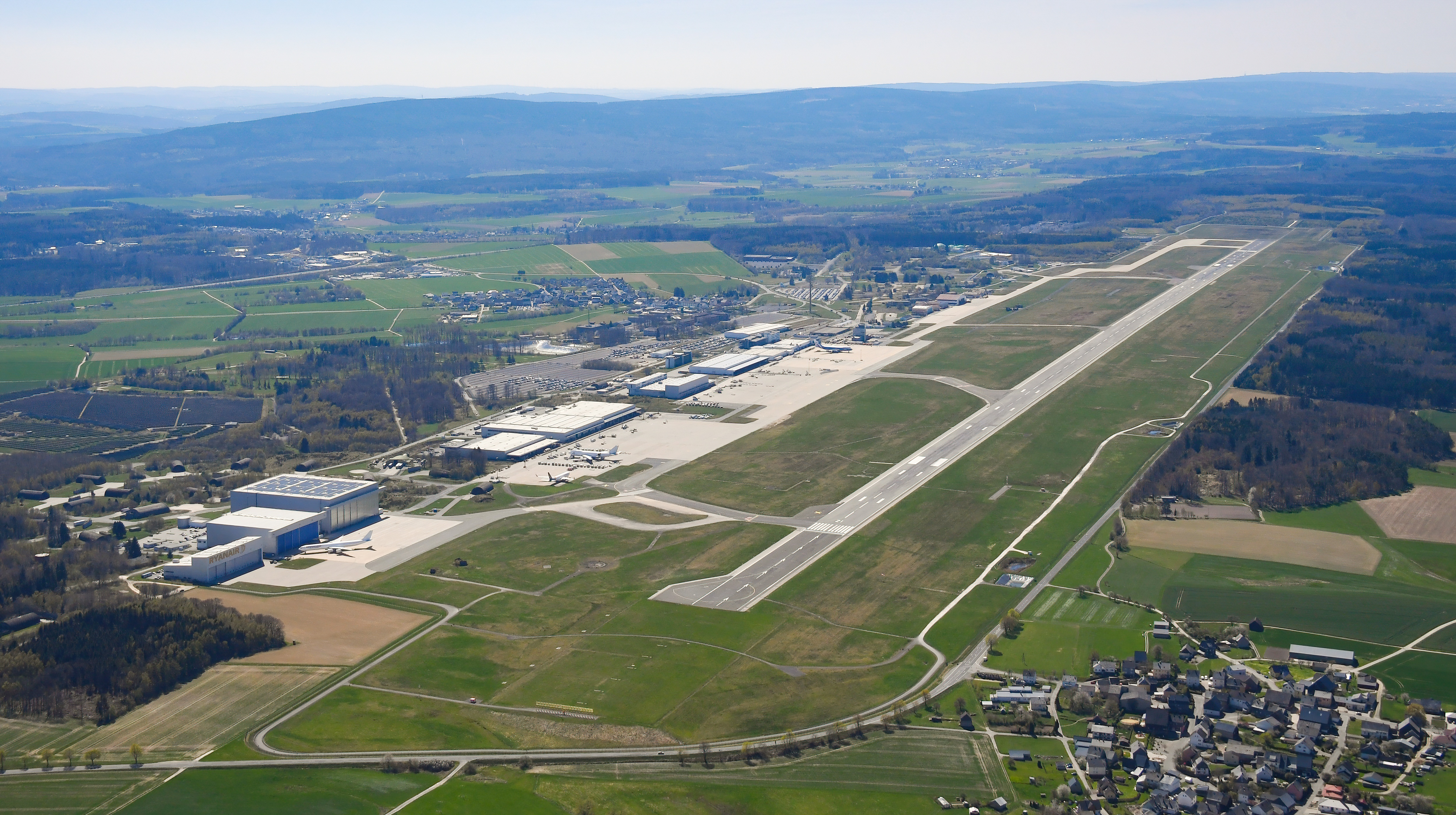
- IATA: HHN; ICAO: EDFH

Summary
- Airport type: Public
- Owner: Triwo Travvex Group (82.5% ) State of Hesse (17.5%)
- Operator: Flughafen Hahn GmbH
- Serves: Frankfurt Rhine-Main
- Location: Lautzenhausen, Rhineland-Palatinate, Germany
- Opened: 30 September 1993; 33 years ago
- Operating base for: Ryanair
- Elevation AMSL: 503 m (1,650 ft)
- Coordinates: 49°56′54″N 007°15′51″E
- Website: www.hahn-airport.de

Map
- Location of airport in Rhineland-Palatinate HHN/EDFH (Germany) HHN/EDFH (Europe)

Runways
Direction	Length		Surface
Direction	m	ft	Surface
03/21	3,800	12,467	Asphalt

Statistics (2022)
- Passengers: 1,377,087 ▲+103,5%
- Aircraft movements: 15,965 ▲+27,2%
- Cargo (metric tons): 220,836 ▼-14,7%
- Statistics at ADV., AIP at German air traffic control.

Hahn Airport (German: Flughafen Hahn) (IATA: HHN, ICAO: EDFH) is an international airport in the municipality of Hahn, Rhineland-Palatinate, Germany.

At the request of Ryanair, the major operator of flights to/from the airport, the airport was named Frankfurt-Hahn Airport from 2001 until its acquisition by Triwo Travvex Group in 2023, when the name was changed back to Hahn Airport. However, according to the German air navigation services provider Deutsche Flugsicherung, its official name is still Frankfurt-Hahn Airport.

The airport is 10 km (6.2 mi) from the town of Kirchberg and 20 km (12 mi) from both Simmern and Traben-Trarbach. The airport is equidistant between Frankfurt and Luxembourg – about 120 km (75 mi) to each city by road. The closest major cities are Koblenz at about 70 km (43 mi) and Mainz at about 90 km (56 mi).

The primary operators of flights to/from the airport are Ryanair and Wizz Air. It is also a prominent cargo airport as a result of its location and 24-hour operating licence.

The airport is 82.5% owned by Triwo Travvex Group and 17.5% owned by the state of Hesse.

== History ==
=== Military base ===
During the Cold War, at which time an invasion of West Germany was a possibility, Hahn Air Base was a frontline air base, and home of the United States Air Force 50th Tactical Fighter Wing (now the 50th Space Wing), in various designations, as part of the United States Air Forces in Europe (USAFE). It was one of several USAFE bases in Germany within 100 kilometres (62 mi) of each other including Zweibrücken Air Base, Ramstein Air Base, Sembach, Bitburg Air Base, Spangdahlem Air Base, and Rhein-Main Air Base. These air bases were well situated to reach all locations within Europe and the Mediterranean Basin. Hahn Air Base had more than 13,000 people and three squadrons of F-16 tactical fighters. At the end of the Cold War, the United States was left with a huge excess capacity of expensive airfields in Europe.

As a result, the squadrons at the base were inactivated: the 496th Tactical Fighter Squadron was inactivated on 15 May 1991, the 313th Tactical Fighter Squadron was inactivated on 1 July 1991, and the 10th Tactical Fighter Squadron was inactivated on 30 September 1991. The 50th Tactical Fighter Wing was inactivated on 30 September 1991 and then activated as the 50th Space Wing at Falcon AFB (now Schriever Air Force Base) in Colorado on 30 January 1992. The inactivations had a significant effect on the local economy.

Most of Hahn Air Base was turned over to German civil authorities on 30 September 1993, though USAFE retained a small portion as a radio communications site until its final turnover to German authorities in 2012. It is still frequently used for military charters operated by, amongst others, Atlas Air, Delta Air Lines, and United Airlines.

The German government turned Hahn Air Base into a civil airport with the goal of reducing traffic to Frankfurt Airport, which is located in the neighbouring state of Hesse. One of the main investors in the development of the airport was Fraport AG, the operator of Frankfurt International Airport, which took a 65% ownership stake in the airport.

In 1996, the faculty and police training school of the Rheinland-Pfalz State Police were combined at a new joint facility located at the air base's former housing area.

=== Losses and ownership transfers ===
In 2003, the airport reported a loss of €17 million, compared to €20 million in 2002.

In 2007, Etihad Cargo switched its German freighter services from Frankfurt International airport to Frankfurt-Hahn airport.

Effective 1 January 2009, Fraport sold its 65% interest in the airport to the government of Rhineland-Palatinate for the symbolic price of €1. The airport had been losing money and Fraport did not want to continue to fund losses. The transaction increased the stake owned by the government to 82.5%.

Also in 2009, a cargo flight departing from Hahn using the Antonov 225 made the world record for the heaviest single piece of air cargo, a 189.98 tonne generator for a Fossil-fuel power station in Armenia.

In 2013, Etihad Cargo, a major customer of the airport, announced the relocation of its cargo operations from Hahn to Frankfurt Airport.

By January 2014, the airport had accumulated debts of €125 million while passenger and cargo traffic were decreasing. The government pledged €80 million to the airport to avoid bankruptcy.

In February 2014, security staff at the airport initiated a strike action.

In the summer of 2014, Ryanair reduced capacity on several routes and removed 3 of 9 aircraft based at the airport.

In March 2015, Yangtze River Express, the largest freight customer of the airport with 4 cargo destinations and accounting for 50,000 of the airport's 130,000 tons of annual volume, announced it would cease its cargo operations at Frankfurt–Hahn Airport in favor of Munich Airport. Months earlier, Qatar Airways and Aeroflot had also ceased their cargo operations at the airport.

In June 2016, the cargo subsidiary of Air France–KLM announced it would shut down its cargo reloading point at the airport, which was used to collect freight and transfer it to Paris by truck.

Also in June 2016, the government of Rhineland-Palatinate announced the sale of its 82.5% interest in the airport to Shanghai Yiqian Trading Company. However, the deal fell apart a month later after the buyer failed to get approval to make the payment.

In August 2016, RAF-Avia from Latvia announced basing two aircraft at the airport to operate ad-hoc charter flights.

In 2017, Suparna, formerly known as Yangtze River Express, began operating a 747-400F at the airport and AirBridgeCargo and Etihad also expanded cargo operations.

In August 2017, HNA Group acquired the 82.5% stake in the airport owned by the government of Rhineland-Palatinate for €15.1 million. In conjunction with the acquisition, the European Commission agreed to cover up to €25.3 million of losses between 2017 and 2021 while HNA makes improvements to the airport.

In February 2018, Ryanair announced the shift of part of its operations from Hahn to Frankfurt Airport, where it opened a base in 2017. One of five aircraft were moved to Frankfurt Airport and four routes were cut at Frankfurt-Hahn.

In May 2019, Ryanair announced further major cuts with a reduction to just 16 routes — from over 40 in earlier years — for the 2019/2020 winter season.

The airport filed for bankruptcy in October 2021.

In May 2023, after a sale to SWIFT CONJOY fell through, and a €20 million bid by Russian oligarch Viktor Kharitonin was scrutinized by the German government, the airport was sold to TRIWO Hahn Airport GmbH, an affiliate of Triwo AG, which agreed to invest €20 million in the site.

== Infrastructure ==
=== Terminals ===
The airport consists of two passenger terminals and one cargo terminal. The passenger terminals, designated A and B, include shops and restaurants including a McDonald's. The apron has 11 stands for mid-sized aircraft, such as the Boeing 737, which are reached on foot. The cargo apron has three stands for large aircraft such as the Boeing 747-8F.

=== Runway ===
Hahn has a long runway of 3,800 metres (12,467 ft) in the direction of 03/21. This, combined with a large apron, allows it to handle some of the world's biggest aircraft, such as the Antonov An-124 or the Boeing Dreamlifter. While the Antonov is a frequent visitor, the Dreamlifter has only landed twice at the airport, both times in 2010. An Instrument Landing System is available, with runway 21 being category 3 approved; low-visibility conditions are a frequent problem at the airport, especially in autumn and winter.

== Airlines and destinations ==
=== Passenger ===
The following airlines operate regular scheduled and charter flights at Hahn:

Airlines	Destinations
Air Arabia	Seasonal: Nador
Air Serbia	Niš
FlyOne	Chișinău
Ryanair	Agadir, Alicante, Bari, Catania, Faro, Fès, Kerry, Lamezia Terme, London–Stansted, Málaga, Marrakesh, Nador, Palma de Mallorca, Pescara, Porto, Rabat, Rome–Fiumicino, Sofia, Tenerife–South, Thessaloniki; Seasonal: Alghero, Barcelona, Budapest, Cagliari, Chania, Girona, Ibiza, Palermo, Rijeka, Valencia, Vilnius, Zadar
Wizz Air	Bucharest–Băneasa, Cluj-Napoca, Kutaisi, Pristina (begins 14 December 2026), Sibiu, Skopje, Timișoara, Tirana, Tuzla, Varna

=== Cargo ===
Airlines	Destinations
Aerotranscargo	Baku, Rio de Janeiro–Galeão, Riyadh
Atlas Air	Halifax, Mumbai, Riyadh
Silk Way West Airlines	Baku, Vienna
Suparna Airlines	Wuxi, Xi'an

The airport is also used by further cargo carriers on an irregular basis, e. g. for ad-hoc charter or military operations.

== Statistics ==
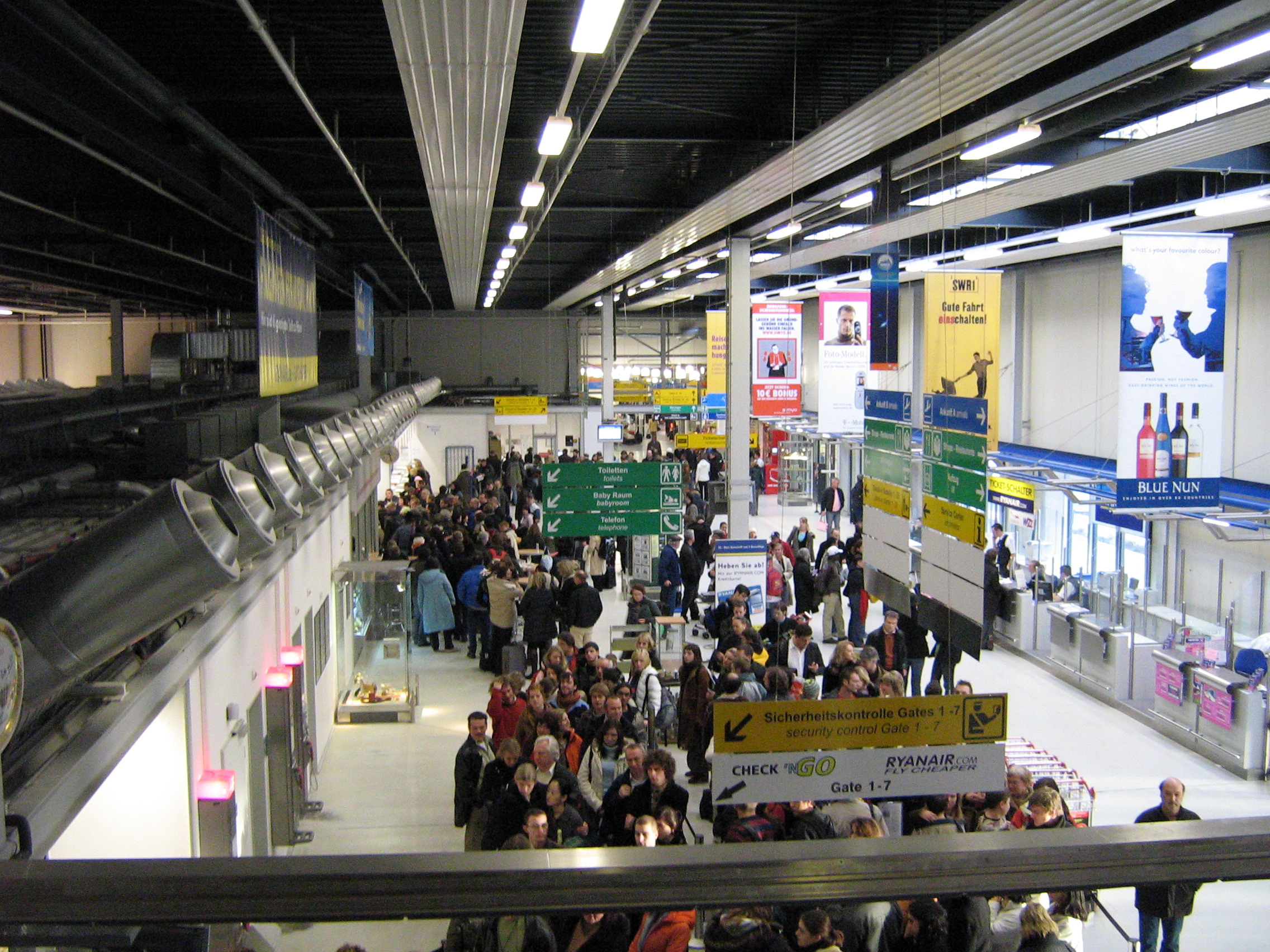
Check-in area

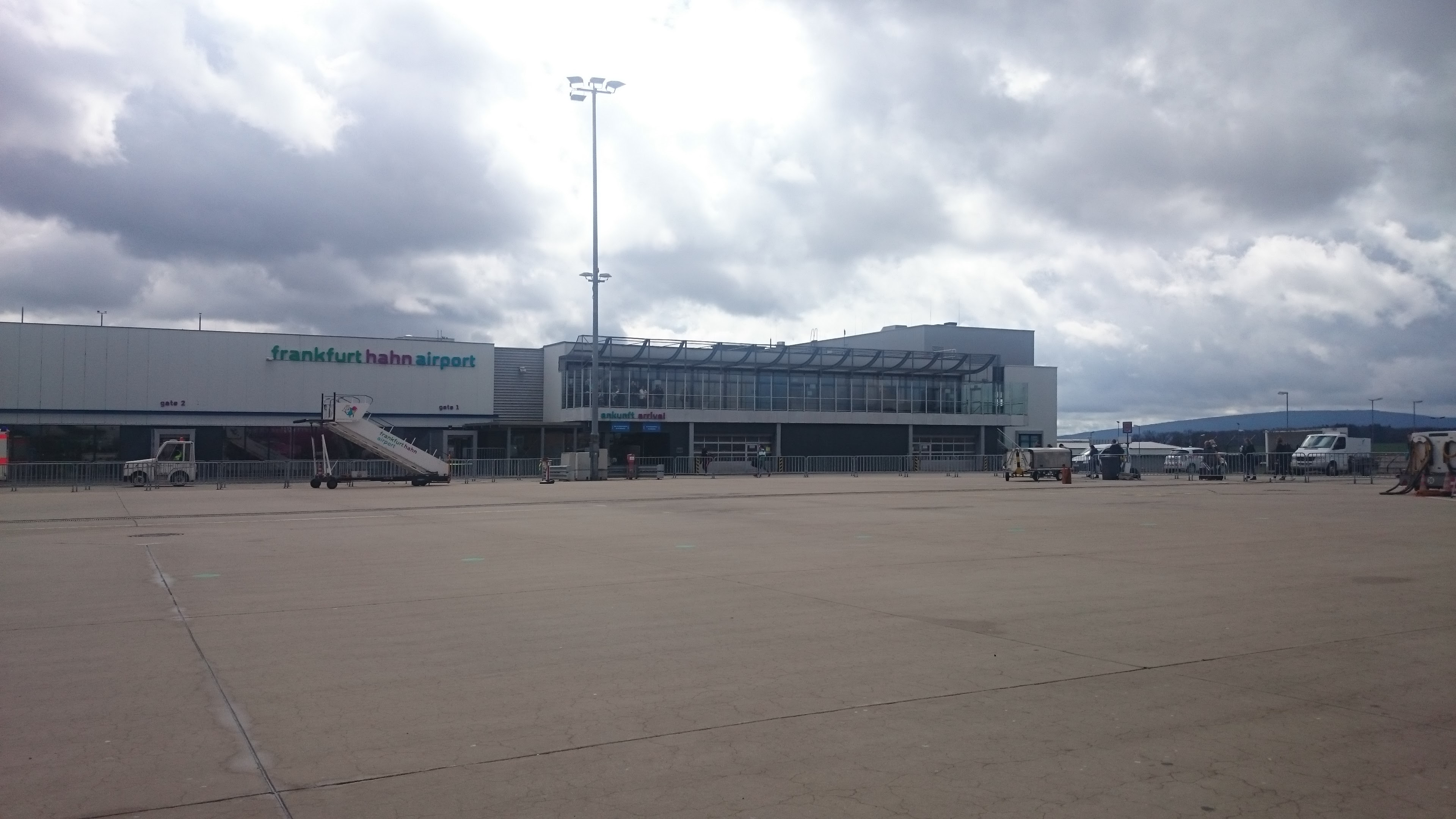
Apron in front of the passenger terminal

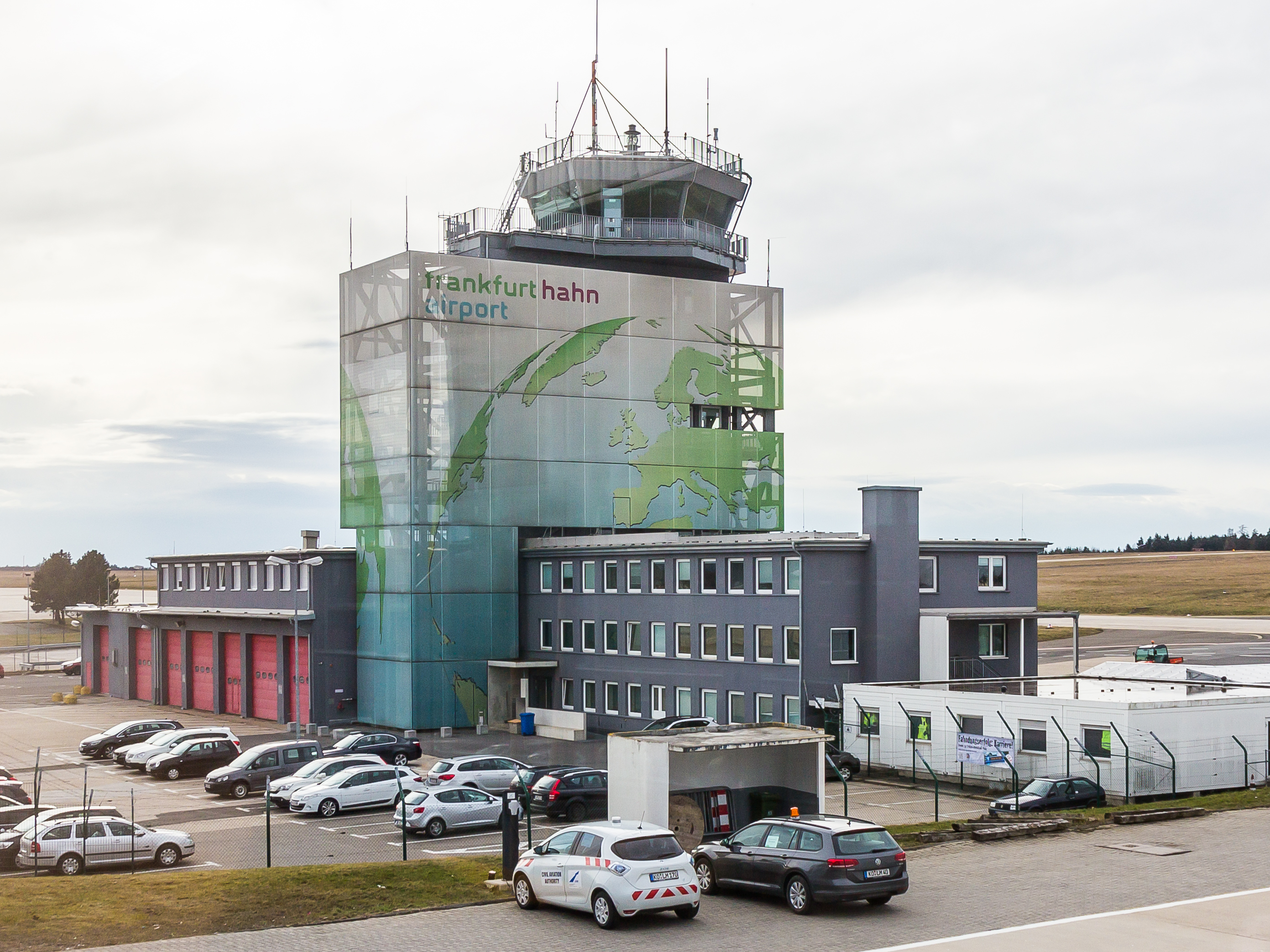
Control tower

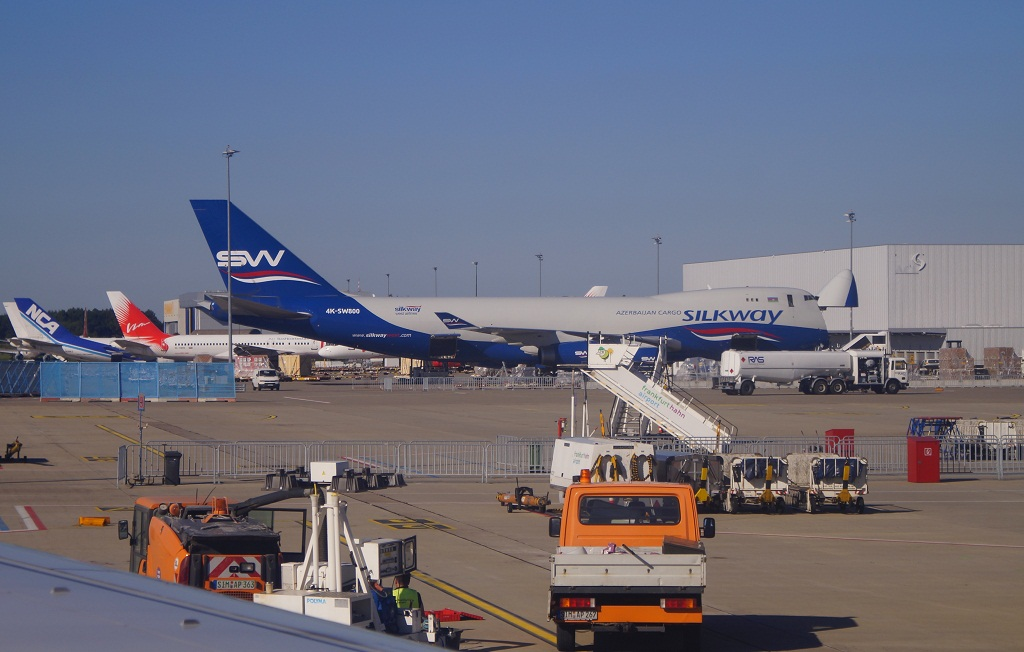
Overview of the cargo apron

	Passengers
2004	2,751,585
2005	▲3,076,823
2006	▲3,704,633
2007	▲4,014,898
2008	▼3,940,159
2009	▼3,793,710
2010	▼3,493,451
2011	▼2,894,109
2012	▼2,790,961
2013	▼2,667,402
2014	▼2,447,140
2015	▲2,667,000
2016	▼2,609,156
2017	▼2,472,198
2018	▼2,092,868
2019	▼1,496,362
2020	▼436,862
2021	▲678,829
2022	▲1,377,087
2023	▲1,673,219
2024	▲1,865,112

The airport had a turnover of 156,000 tons of cargo in 2019.

== Ground transportation ==
=== Bus ===
As of September 2023, the airport can be reached with the following long-distance bus and regional lines provided by Intermezzo, Flibco and FlixBus.

=== Rail ===
The airport has no railway station. The nearest train station is in Traben-Trarbach, the terminus of the Pünderich–Traben-Trarbach railway. The nearest long-distance railway stations are Bullay (on the Koblenz–Trier railway), and Idar-Oberstein (on the Mainz–Bad Kreuznach–Saarbrücken line.) Frequent buses also run to the main railway station of nearby cities.

=== Car ===
The nearest Autobahn connections are approximately 40 kilometres (25 mi) to the west (A1) or east (A 61). Parking and car rental are available at the airport.

== Legal issues ==
=== Name controversy ===
In 2001, Ryanair began flying to the airport, using it as a second base for its European operations. At the request of Ryanair, the name of the airport was officially changed from Hahn Airport to Frankfurt–Hahn Airport. Lufthansa began legal proceedings against Ryanair in 2002, claiming the usage of "Frankfurt" in the name to be false advertising. Ryanair was allowed to keep the name but was forced to clarify in its advertising that the airport is actually 120 kilometers (75 miles) by road from Frankfurt. In March 2023, the new owners, Triwo, changed the name back to "Hahn Airport".

== See also ==
- Transport in Germany
- List of airports in Germany
