= Greenacre School for Girls =

Coordinates: 51.3297°N 0.1940°W

Greenacre School

Location
- Sutton Lane; Banstead, Surrey, SM7 3RA; England

Information
- Type: Independent
- Established: 1933
- Founders: Sabine Pasley and Patricia Wagstaffe
- Closed: 2017
- Local authority: Surrey
- Department for Education URN: 125318 Tables
- Headmistress: Lindsay Redding
- Gender: Girls
- Age: 3 to 18
- Website: www.greenacre.surrey.sch.uk

Greenacre School for Girls was an independent girls' school, founded in 1933, in Banstead, Surrey, England, which closed in 2017.

It was inspected by the Independent Schools Inspectorate and was a member of the Girls' Schools Association. The governors of the school turned it over to United Learning in 2015.

It closed in 2017, at the end of the academic year. The site is now used for the new independent and co-educational Banstead Preparatory School, which opened in September 2017 with the merger of Greenacre School for Girls, Priory School, and Bramley School in Banstead, Surrey. The new school is on the former Greenacre site, for pupils aged from 2 to 11. Pupils in Greenacre Junior School will transferred to the new school, and pupils in the Senior School were guaranteed places at other local schools. Banstead Preparatory School is run by United Learning.
