= Peter de Putron =

English businessman

- Born: Peter Nicholas de Putron; 15 October 1963 (age 63)
- Education: Eton College; University of Oxford; Wharton School
- Occupation: Hedge fund manager
- Employer(s): Royal Bank of Canada; G-Research
- Known for: Owner of G-Research
- Spouse: Carolynne Hayley Salmon
- Children: 4

Peter Nicholas de Putron (born 15 October 1963) is a British financier, and the founder of De Putron Fund Management, G-Research and associated companies.

== Education and early life ==
De Putron grew up in Guernsey, where his father was a local politician. He was privately educated at Eton College followed by the University of Oxford where he was an undergraduate student at Jesus College, Oxford and graduated with Bachelor of Arts (BA) and Master of Arts (MA) degrees in engineering science. From 1990 to 1992, De Putron attended Wharton School of the University of Pennsylvania graduating in 1992 with a Master of Business Administration (MBA) in finance and entrepreneurial management.

== Career ==
De Putron began his career in the corporate finance department of Royal Bank of Canada in 1985. From 1987 to 1990 he worked at GNI, a brokerage firm where he traded derivatives. He then worked at IFM, a London-based hedge fund where he specialized in market neutral solutions. He founded De Putron Fund Management (DPFM) in 1997, which had seed money from George Soros. G-Research, a quantitative investment firm is part of the De Putron Fund Management Group.

=== Political activities ===
De Putron is the brother-in-law of Andrea Leadsom, a British Conservative Party member of Parliament and financial services minister who was briefly a contender for the position of leader of the Conservative party and hence Prime Minister in July 2016. Leadsom also worked for De Putron Fund Management in the 1990s.

De Putron has donated money to Leadsom and the Conservative Party, as well as Eurosceptic think tanks.

De Putron was one of those mentioned in the "Jersey files" which were leaked from Kleinwort Benson to the International Consortium of Investigative Journalists.

=== Other ventures ===
According to The Times in March 2024, De Putron is the real owner of the Williams Racing team.

== Personal life ==
De Putron is resident in Jersey. He is regarded as a very private and reclusive individual.

He is married to Carolynne Hayley Salmon and has 4 children.
