= Pharmstandard =

Russian pharmaceutical company

JSC Pharmstandard
- Company type: Private
- Industry: Pharmaceuticals
- Founded: 2003
- Headquarters: Dolgoprudny, Russia
- Area served: Worldwide
- Key people: Viktor Kharitonin (Chairman); Igor Krylov (CEO)
- Products: Remedies
- Revenue: $638 million (2017)
- Operating income: $231 million (2016)
- Net income: $119 million (2016)
- Total assets: $1.41 billion (2016)
- Total equity: $936 million (2016)
- Number of employees: 6,450 (2015)
- Website: pharmstd.com

JSC Pharmstandard (Russian: ПАО "Фармстандарт", romanized: PAO "Farmstandart") is a Russian multinational pharmaceutical company. It is headquartered in Dolgoprudny, Moscow Oblast.

Pharmstandard's makes and exports over 400 generic and proprietary drugs, including products used in the treatment of diabetes, growth hormone deficiency, cardiovascular diseases, gastroenterological and neurological disorders, infectious diseases, cancer, etc.

The company has six manufacturing facilities located in Moscow, Ufa, Nizhny Novgorod, Kursk, Tomsk and Tyumen.

== History ==
Pharmstandard was established in 2003 as a result of a merger.

In May 2007 the company raised $880 million in an IPO, valuing the company at $2.2 billion. Roman Abramovich owned a 17% stake in the company until March 2008.

In 2013 the company announced plans to buy the ingredient supplier Bever Pharmaceutical, causing Pharmstandard shares to fall 25%.

Pharmstandard was delisted from the London and Moscow stock exchanges in 2017.
