= Viktor Kharitonin =

Russian billionaire businessman

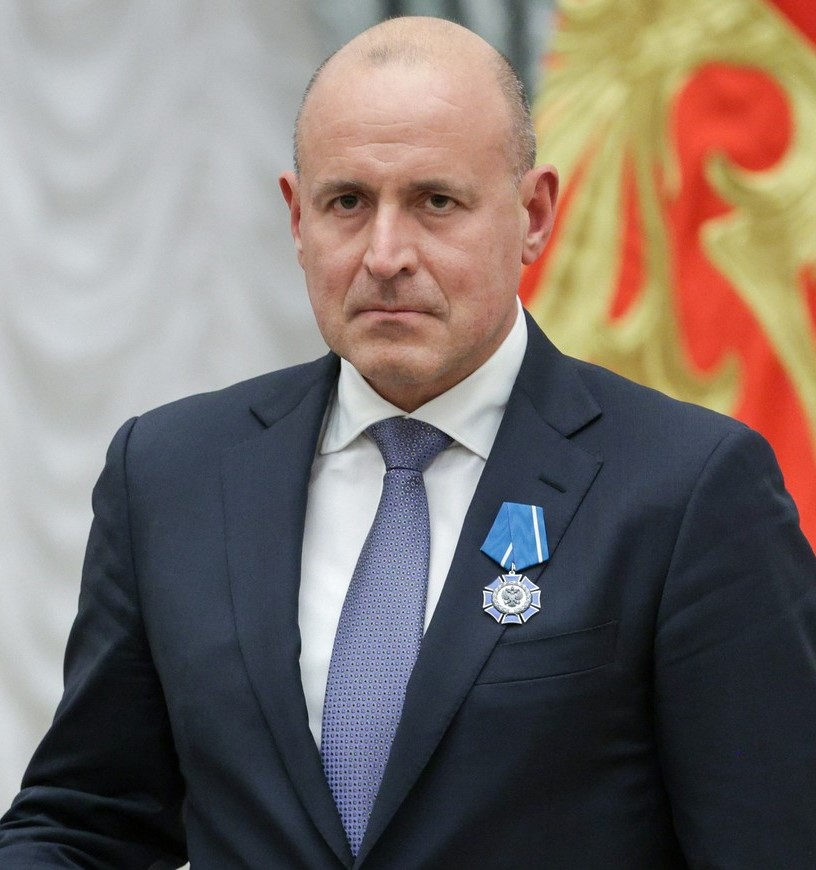
- Occupation: Businessman

Viktor Kharitonin (Russian: Виктор Владимирович Харитонин) is a Russian billionaire. He is known to be close to Russian Deputy Prime Minister Tatyana Golikova and her husband Viktor Khristenko.

== Biography ==
Kharitonin made his fortune from the pharmaceutical firm Pharmstandard, which he co-founded with Roman Abramovich. Along with his partner, Egor Kulkov, Kharitonin listed the firm on the London Stock Exchange in 2008, but then they brought it back into private hands in 2016. In November 2021, Kharitonin and Kulkov acquired TSS group, an equipment manufacturing firm serving oil producers through Augment Investments. As of April 2022, Kharitonin's net worth is $2.8 Bn according to Forbes.

Kharitonin also owns the Nürburgring race track in the German state of Rhineland-Palatinate and is in talks to buy the nearby bankrupt Frankfurt–Hahn Airport.

He resides primarily in Moscow. He graduated from Novosibirsk State University.

== Sanctions ==
He is one of the Russian billionaires who were not sanctioned in 2018 or during the 2022 Russian Invasion of Ukraine by a country other than Ukraine itself. However, Kharitonin allegedly avoided the sanction by relocating his firm Augment Investments, in which he has majority ownership, to Oktyabrsky Island from Cyprus, utilizing the Special Economic Region scheme of Russia.

== See also ==
- Pharmstandard
