= G-Research =

British quantitative finance research and technology firm

Trenchant Limited
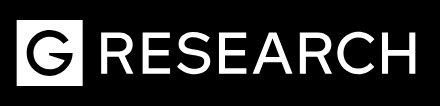
- Trade name: G-Research
- Formerly: Gloucester Research; GR Software & Research
- Type: Private
- Industry: Investment Management
- Founded: 2001; 25 years ago
- Founder: Peter de Putron
- Headquarters: London, United Kingdom
- Key people: Mark Jones (CEO)
- Owner: Peter de Putron
- Number of employees: 1200 (2023)
- Parent: Pans (UK) Holdings Limited
- Website: www.gresearch.co.uk

G-Research (legal name: Trenchant Limited) is a British quantitative finance research and technology firm. The firm makes use of machine learning, big data, and other technologies to predict movements in the financial markets.

== Background ==
In 1997, Peter de Putron formed his own hedge fund named De Putron Fund Management which had seed money from George Soros. The newsletter MARHedge reported in 1999 that the fund was managing about $100 million. The fund became a group of different companies known as De Putron Fund Management Group Limited. Although the entity known De Putron Fund Management no longer exists, the group of companies is still operational and is mainly owned by de Putron. By 2014, a former employee estimated that the amount being managed was $3 billion to $5 billion although this figure was disputed by a spokeswoman for de Putron.

One of companies in the group was founded in 2001 as Gloucester Research, which was focused on quantitative finance.

The firm has changed its name to GR Software & Research and then Trenchant. While it is legally known as Trenchant, the firm now operates under the trade name, G-Research.

G-Research employs quants that are staff who perform quantitative analysis on financial investments. In the London office, quants create algorithmic trading strategies and software. The traders who are based in the Guernsey office use the trading signals produced from these software to perform trades. The firm is known to pay very high starting salaries of almost $200000 to new graduates who join the firm as quants.

G-Research considers its trading algorithmic codes as trade secrets and has employed very stringent security measures to ensure they cannot be copied or stolen. It has taken significant legal action against former employees that are suspected of copying or stealing its trade secrets.

The current CEO of G-Research is Mark Jones, who was appointed at the start of 2025.

The fund group and G-Research itself have been labeled in the media as Hedge funds although they might be considered closer to a family offices. Former employees have stated that most of the assets being managed belong to de Putron and that capital from external investors isn't normally accepted.

== Legal actions against former employees ==
=== Ke Xu lawsuit ===
Ke Xu was born in Hubei, China and won a scholarship to Raffles Institution in Singapore. He then attended the University of Cambridge where he graduated third in his class of 250 with a degree in mathematics. In 2008, he joined Goldman Sachs where he worked on pricing credit derivatives. In 2012, he joined G-Research as a quant. In early 2014 he received a bonus of £400000 which he was dissatisfied with. In July, he accepted a job in Hong Kong at Cubist Systematic, a division of Point72 Asset Management. In August, he resigned from G-Research. Xu shortly after was on a flight to Hong Kong where he met his family near the China border and gave them a desktop computer and three laptops. G-Research, on suspicion that Xu was taking company trade secrets with him to a competitor, immediately initiated legal action against Xu. Xu was arrested in Hong Kong and extradited back to the UK in December where he continued to be held in custody. In June 2015, Xu pleaded guilty to fraud and in his written statement, admitted to reverse engineering 55 G-Research trading strategies for personal gain. On 3 July 2015, Xu was sentenced to four years in prison although he could be released as early as one year. However G-Research was not satisfied with the outcome as Xu maintained he had not kept or copied any G-Research code. The firm engaged in private prosecution to find out who had seen the 55 trading strategies. In July 2016, Xu was denied early release. In December 2016, Xu stood trial as a witness under private prosecution and was questioned on why he couldn't return the devices that were sent to China. Xu said they were either stolen or thrown in the Yangtze. Xu was also questioned about his job offer to which he denied G-Research's insinuations that he offered Cubist any of the firm's trading strategies as he believed Steve Cohen wouldn't risk using them. Xu's mother, Lu Juanhe testified by videoconferencing that she threw the devices into the Yangtze on 30 December. This testimony was rejected by the firm's lawyer stating that they had hired Chinese detectives to monitor her flat and that she never left on this day. In January 2017, jurors found Xu guilty of two of the five charges in the private prosecution. They stated that while he couldn't be held responsible for not returning the computers, he had not sufficiently explained where the 55 trading strategies had gone and who viewed them. The judge sentenced him to an additional 18 months in prison although early release was still an option. G-Research still continued to pursue additional legal action against Xu. In June 2018, Xu was handed an additional prison term of 13 months. G-Research has stated that it has simply followed the legal process as a victim of theft which was to ensure justice is done and that the perpetrator does not profit from his crime. In January 2019, Xu was finally released after four and a half years behind bars and was deported to China. Xu stated he no longer wanted to work in the hedge fund industry and wanted to work in artificial intelligence instead.

=== Quadrature Capital ===
In 2008, five employees left G-Research to found Quadrature Capital, a London-based quantitative finance firm which officially commenced in 2010. G-Research responded initially by threatening a lawsuit and in 2011, actually filing one. The filings suggested that nothing had been stolen but G-Research argued that the five former employees had developed quantitative trading skills at the firm so any new platform they would have would be similar and therefore an infringement of intellectual property. Some of the five former employees said in their filings that they found tracking devices on their cars and could see they were being followed by outside parties which was considered harassment. The lawsuit lasted until 2014 where it was settled on confidential terms.

== Political activities ==
G-Research has donated almost £700000 to the Fresh Start Project, a eurosceptic pressure group that was led by Andrea Leadsom.

As of 2014, G-Research has been noted to have donated £816000 to the Conservative Party.
