= Quadrature Capital =

UK-based quantitative finance hedge fund

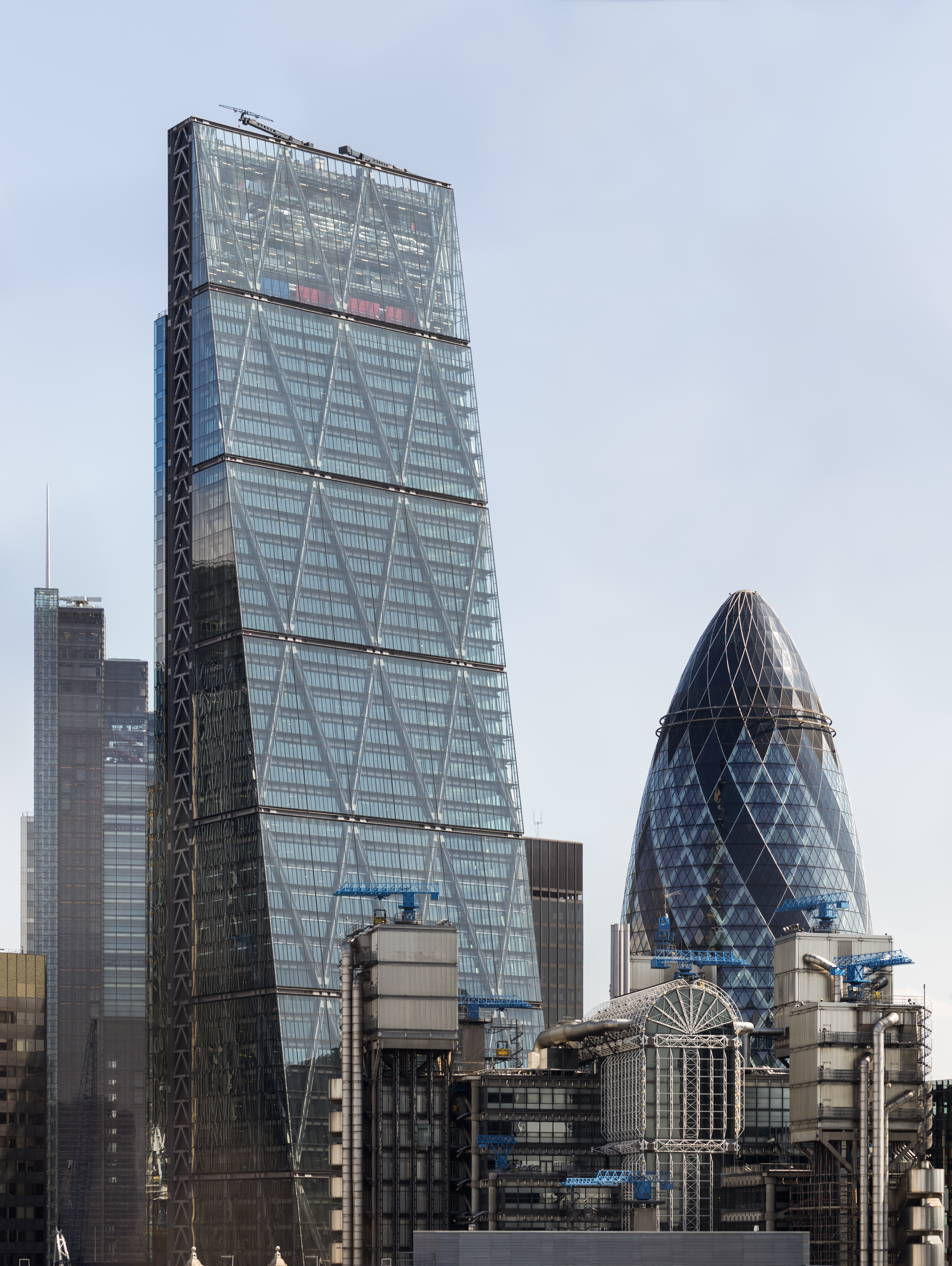
- Quadrature occupy floors 31–34 of 122 Leadenhall Street
- Type: Private company
- Industry: Financial services
- Founded: 2008; 18 years ago
- Founders: Greg Skinner and Suneil Setiya
- Headquarters: London, United Kingdom
- Area served: United Kingdom
- Products: Hedge fund
- AUM: US$8.4 billion (2026)
- Website: quadrature.ai

Quadrature Capital is a British quantitative finance hedge fund. The company's headquarters occupy floors 31–34 of 122 Leadenhall Street, London.

As of May 2026, total assets under management (AUM) were US$8.4 billion plus undisclosed cash.

== History ==
Quadrature Capital was started by five former employees of quantitative finance firm G-Research in 2008. The founders included financiers Greg Skinner and Suneil Setiya.

In 2022, The Times reported that Quadrature paid it staff an average of £3 million each.

In May 2024, they gave the largest ever donation to the UK's Labour Party, £4 million.
