= Kieran Setiya =

American philosopher

- Born: Hull, UK
- Awards: Charles A. Ryskamp Fellowship

Education
- Education: Jesus College, Cambridge (BA); Princeton University (PhD)

Philosophical work
- Era: 21st-century philosophy
- Region: Western philosophy
- School: Analytic
- Institutions: Massachusetts Institute of Technology
- Main interests: ethics, epistemology, philosophy of mind
- Website: http://www.ksetiya.net/

Kieran Setiya is a professor of philosophy at the Massachusetts Institute of Technology. He was born in Hull, UK and educated at Hymers College. He is known for his work in ethics, epistemology, and the philosophy of mind. Setiya is a co-editor of Philosophers' Imprint. He has also been active in public philosophy and hosts a podcast, Five Questions, in which he asks contemporary philosophers five questions about themselves.

== Books ==
- Life Is Hard, Riverhead Books (US), Hutchinson Heinemann (UK), 2022
- Midlife: A Philosophical Guide, Princeton University Press, 2017
- Practical Knowledge, Oxford University Press, 2016
- Knowing Right from Wrong, Oxford University Press, 2012
- Reasons without Rationalism, Princeton University Press, 2007

== Other works ==
- Intention, article in the Stanford Encyclopedia of Philosophy, first published 2009, revised July 2022.
