= Priory Preparatory School =

The Priory School
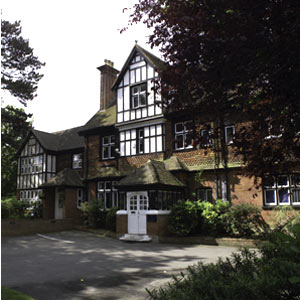
- The Priory School, Banstead

Location
- Bolters Lane; Banstead, Surrey, SM7 2AJ; England; 51.3225°N 0.2062°W

Information
- Type: Preparatory School
- Motto: "Olim Meminisse Iuvabit" (Latin for "Perhaps someday it will help to remember")
- Established: 1921
- Founder: Charles S Poole
- Closed: 2017
- Staff: 35
- Gender: Boys
- Age: 2 to 13
- Enrolment: 180 (Approx)
- Houses: St.Andrew, St.David and St.George
- Colour
- Publication: Priory Post
- Website: http://www.priory-banstead.surrey.sch.uk/index.php

Priory Preparatory School was a preparatory school in Banstead, Surrey, England, for boys aged two to thirteen years, which was closed in 2017. The school was a member of the Independent Association of Preparatory Schools (IAPS) and of the Independent Schools Council (ISC). It was founded in 1921, and was a charitable trust. Upon closure in 2017, pupils moved to the new Banstead Preparatory School at the site formerly occupied by Greenacre School for Girls. The school's buildings at the old site on Bolters Lane, including the historic mansion known as the Red House were demolished in January 2021 to make way for the development of retirement apartments.

== History ==
The main building, known as the Red House, was built in 1885 and given to Herbert Edgar Reid and his wife as a wedding present from his father-in-law.

The Priory School was founded in 1921 within Sydenham, County of London by Charles S. Poole, and was called as such because it occupied an old building that had been a priory. It moved to the Red House in 1936.

The school originally catered for both boys and girls up to the age of twelve, but after the move to Banstead it eventually became an all-boys preparatory school. The task of changing the school to an all-boys school fell to John Skinner, who was given this task when he first came to the Red House at Priory in 1938.

The Priory was one of the schools in Banstead that remained open throughout World War II. On 17 November 1940, the school was extensively damaged by fire resulting from high explosive incendiary bombs that hit the top floor of the Red House. The damage to the school was so severe that repairs could not be carried out until after the war's end. Because of the fire damage, the number of pupils dropped dramatically, and in 1944 the school only had eighteen pupils. During this period, the school was only able to operate on half days, with lessons being held in the cellar of the Red House.

== Headmasters ==
- Mr. Charles S. Poole (1921–1951)
- Mr. John Skinner (1951–1980)
- Mr. John Saunders-Griffiths (1980–1990)
- Mr. Ian R Chapman (1990–2000)
- Mr. Graham Malcolm (2000–2017)

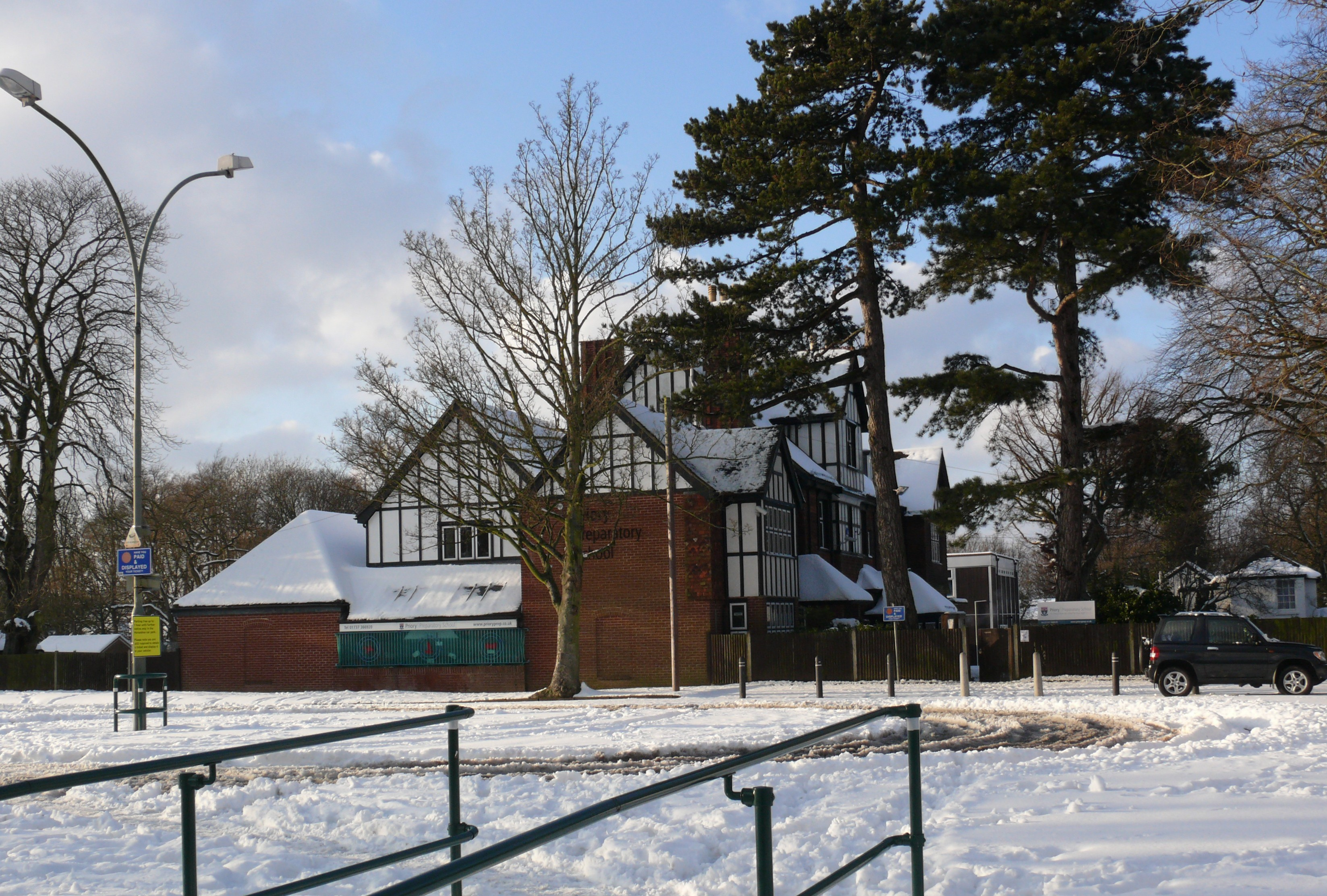
Priory School, February 2009
