= Estates Gazette =

UK commercial property market magazine

EG (formerly Estates Gazette)
- Editor: Tim Burke
- Categories: Real estate
- Frequency: Weekly
- Circulation: 22,500
- Founded: 1858
- Company: Mark Allen Group
- Country: United Kingdom
- Language: English
- Website: estatesgazette.co.uk
- ISSN: 0014-1240

Estates Gazette (formerly EG) is a provider of data, news and analytics for the UK commercial property market. It was first published in 1858, celebrated its 150th anniversary in 2008.

== History ==
Reed International acquired Estates Gazette in 1990.

In 1996, Estates Gazette launched its own online property news and research arm, EGi. In 1997, the group launched Propertylink, the UK's largest free-access commercial property availability search website.

In March 2008, Estates Gazette was announced as one of the top 500 "Business Superbrands" in the UK.

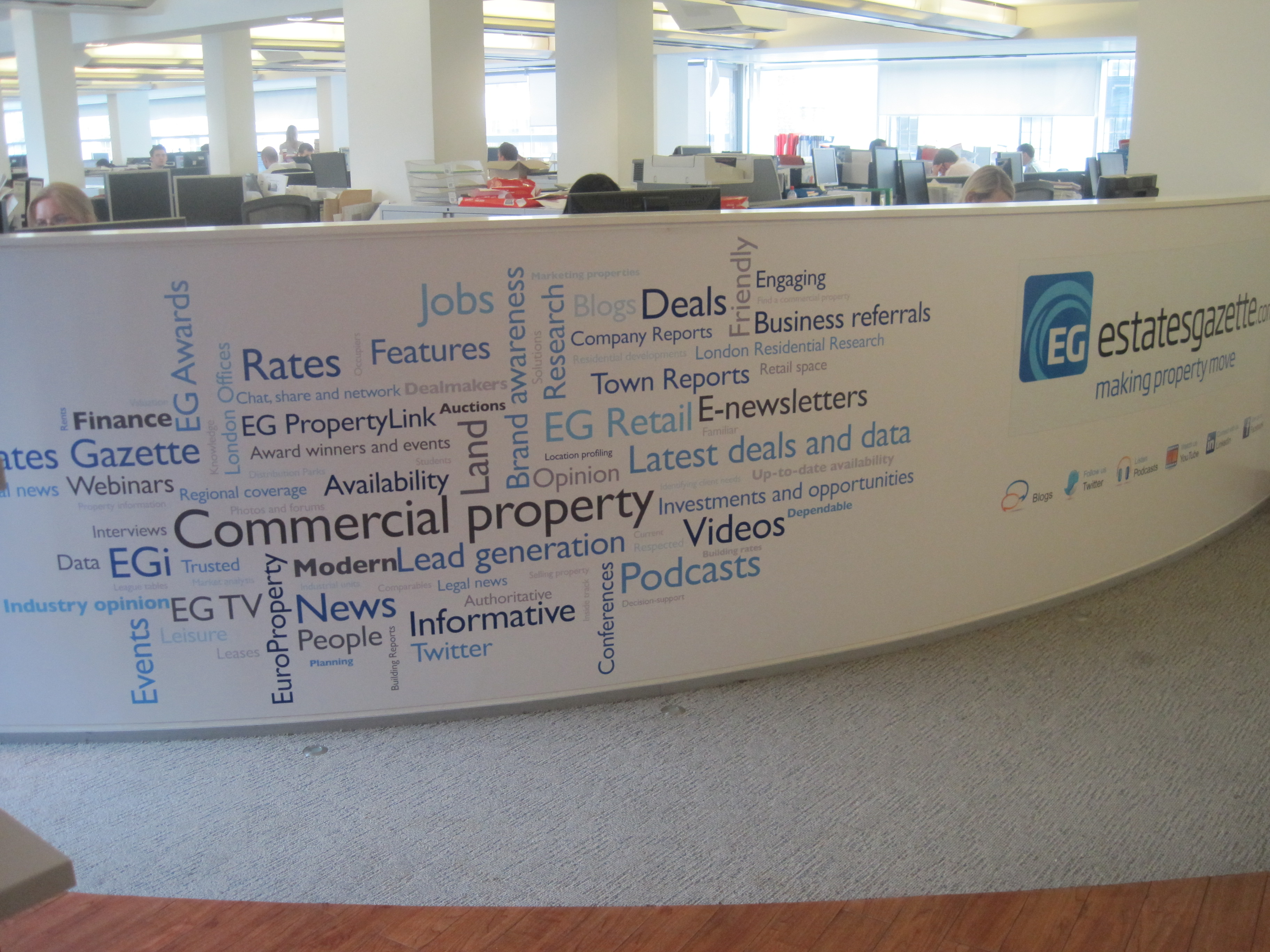
EG Office (2012)

EG is part of a portfolio of brands that belongs to RELX subsidiary LexisNexis Risk Solutions. The publication hosted the annual "EG Awards", held in London.

In 2018, Estates Gazette was critical of property events including MIPIM and the Presidents Club charity dinner.

In December 2024, it was announced that, after 166 years, Estate Gazette would cease publication in 2025. EG's managing director Chris Fleetwood said "headwinds that have struck the whole of the commercial real estate industry hard have had an irreparable impact on the EG business." All EG products and services, including the magazine and the EG Radius data and EG Propertylink listings businesses would be withdrawn from the market during 2025. However, the magazine was saved from closure when it was acquired by Mark Allen Group for £2m.

== See also ==
- Estates Gazette Law Reports
