= David Richards, Lord Richards of Camberwell =

British judge (born 1951)

The Right Honourable Lord Richards of Camberwell
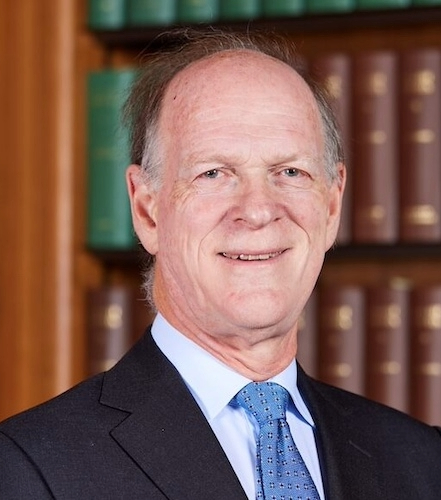

Justice of the Supreme Court of the United Kingdom
- In office 3 October 2022 – 9 June 2026
- Nominated by: Dominic Raab
- Appointed by: Elizabeth II
- Preceded by: Lady Arden of Heswall

Lord Justice of Appeal
- In office 2015–2021
- Monarch: Elizabeth II

Personal details
- Born: 10 June 1951 (age 75)
- Education: Oundle School
- Alma mater: Trinity College, Cambridge

David Anthony Stewart Richards, Lord Richards of Camberwell, PC (born 9 June 1951) was a Justice of the Supreme Court of the United Kingdom from 2022 to 2026.

== Biography ==
The son of Kenneth Richards, MBE and Winifred Richards, he was educated at Oundle School and Trinity College, Cambridge (BA 1973; MA 1980).

He was called to the bar at Inner Temple in 1974. He was made a QC in 1992 and judge of the High Court of Justice (Chancery Division) in 2003. He was appointed as a chairman of the Competition Appeal Tribunal in 2014. Whilst at the Bar, Lord Richards' principal area of practice was company law and corporate insolvency, including takeovers, mergers, and acquisitions, corporate restructuring, joint ventures, shareholder disputes, directors' duties and governance, and corporate regulation. These were also regarded as his areas of expertise during his judicial service.

He was appointed a Lord Justice of Appeal on 16 November 2015. He retired on reaching the then applicable retirement age of 70 in June 2021.

On 17 August 2022, it was announced that Richards had been appointed as a Justice of the Supreme Court of the United Kingdom. Lord Richards was sworn in on 3 October 2022, when it was announced that he would take the judicial title Lord Richards of Camberwell.

On 27 October 2025, Lord Richards announced his planned retirement from the Supreme Court. He retired on 9 June 2026. He serves as an arbitrator at One Essex Court.
