= One Hyde Park =

Apartment complex in central London

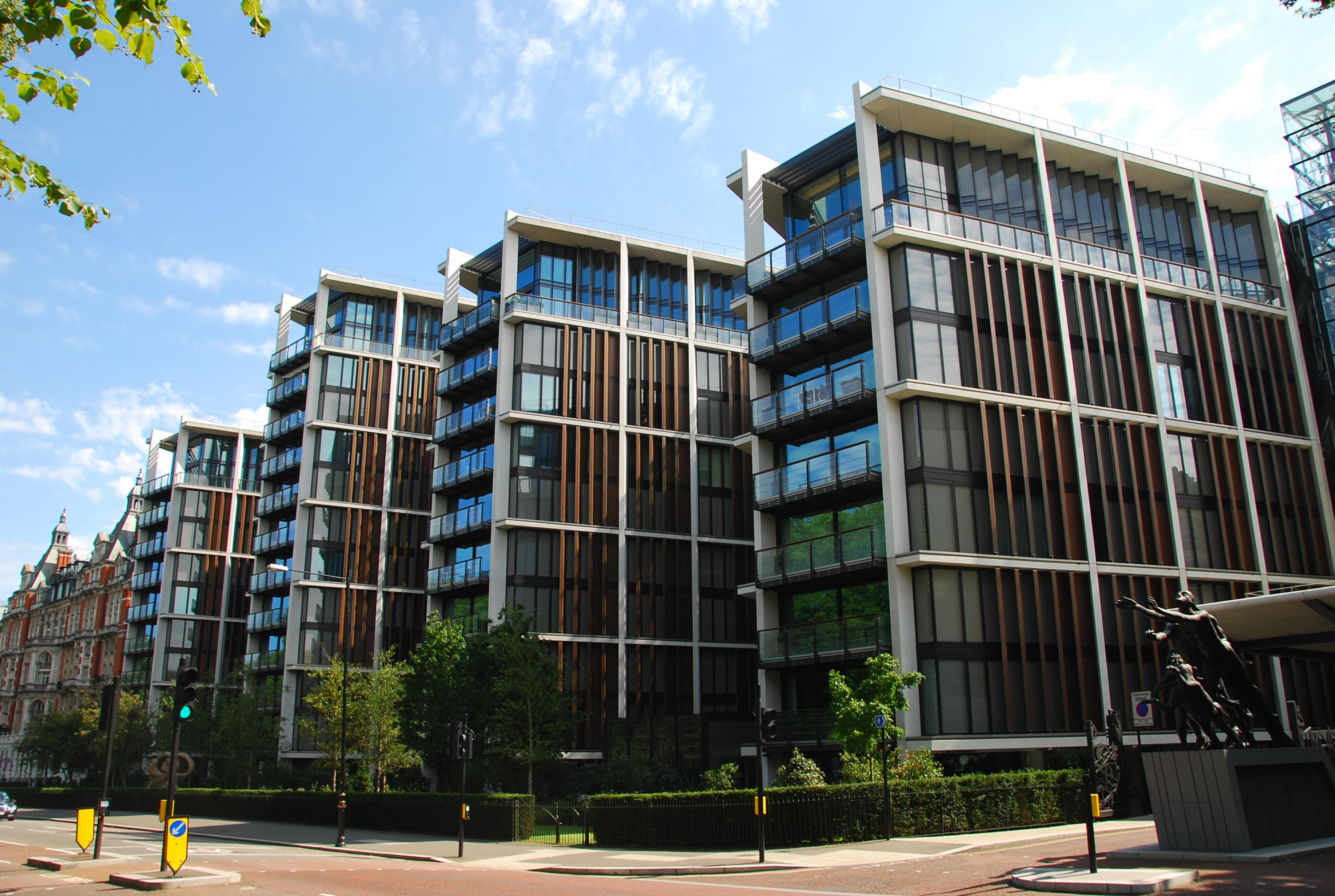
- One Hyde Park in 2012
- Interactive map of the One Hyde Park area

General information
- Type: Residential, retail
- Architectural style: Modernist
- Location: London, United Kingdom, One Hyde Park: The Residences at Mandarin Oriental, 100 Knightsbridge, London, SW1X 7LJ
- Coordinates: 51.5020°N 0.1613°W
- Current tenants: Rolex, McLaren Automotive, Abu Dhabi Islamic Bank
- Construction started: January 2007
- Completed: December 2010; 15 years ago
- Cost: £1.15 billion
- Owner: One Hyde Park Limited

Technical details
- Floor area: 385,000 sq ft (35,800 m^{2})

Design and construction
- Architecture firm: Rogers Stirk Harbour + Partners
- Structural engineer: Arup
- Services engineer: Cundall
- Other designers: Candy & Candy
- Quantity surveyor: Gardiner & Theobald
- Main contractor: Laing O'Rourke

One Hyde Park is a luxury residential and retail complex located in Knightsbridge, London. It is commonly referred to as the most expensive apartment block in the UK.

== Ownership ==
The building was developed by Project Grande (Guernsey) Limited, a joint venture between the Christian Candy-owned CPC Group and Sheikh Hamad bin Jassim bin Jaber Al Thani, former Prime Minister and Minister of Foreign Affairs of Qatar. Graham Stirk led the team at Rogers Stirk Harbour + Partners who designed the building, built by Laing O'Rourke It was financed via a £1.15 billion development loan from Eurohypo AG. Candy & Candy were the development managers and interior designers for the scheme. The building is now owned by One Hyde Park Limited.

== Tenants ==
Commercial tenants as of July 2023 were Rolex, McLaren Automotive and the Abu Dhabi Islamic Bank.

Owners of residences at the address have included Rinat Akhmetov, Kylie Minogue, Idan Ofer, Naguib Sawiris, Amirkhan Mori, Farida Farid khamis, Alexander Ponomarenko, Fahd Khater, Vladimir Stolyarenko, Dane Bowers, Vladimir Uzun, Temur Akhmedov (the son of Farkhad Akhmedov) and the Candy brothers.

== History ==
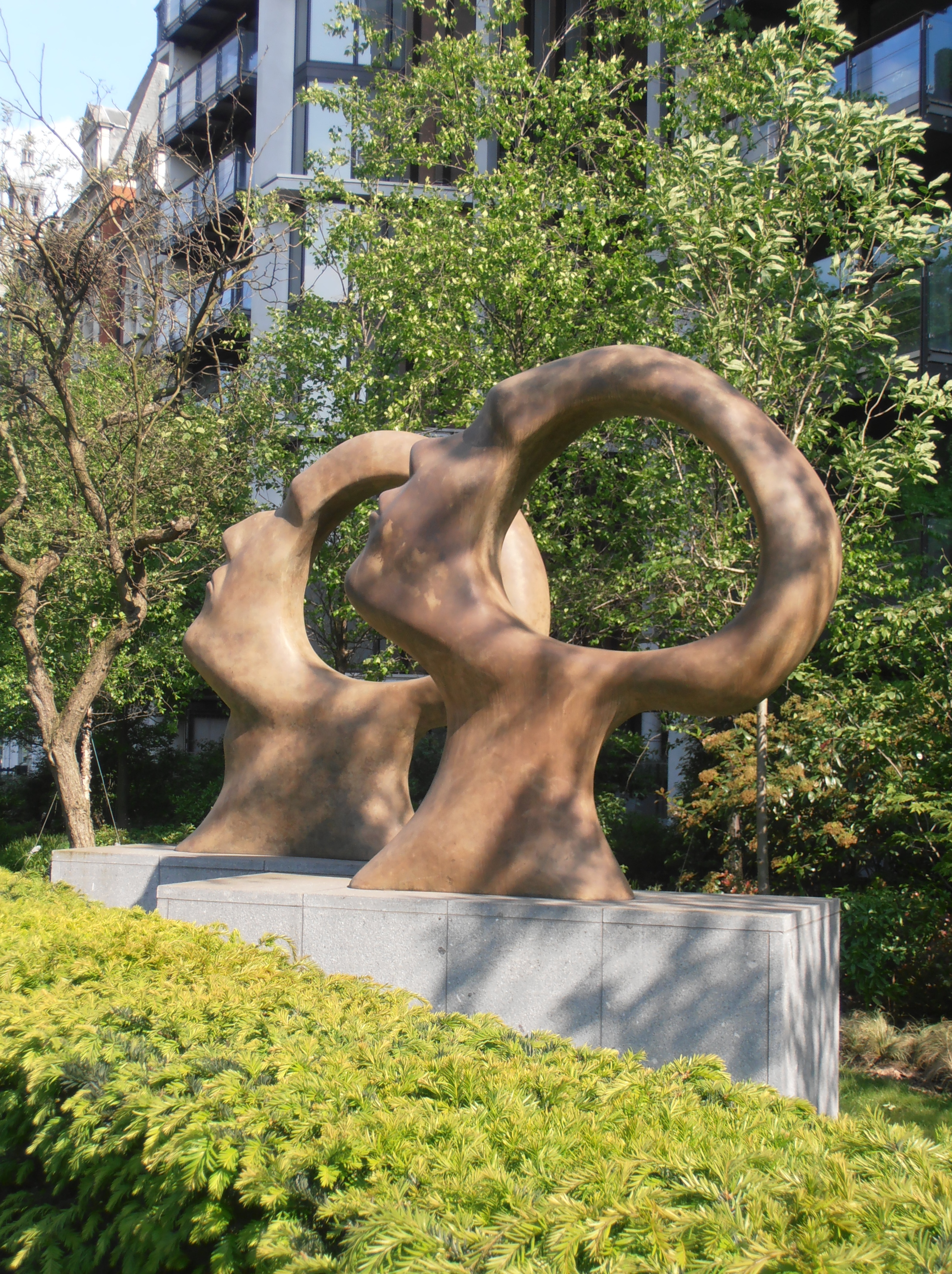
Search for Enlightenment

Planning consent for the building was granted in June 2006. Demolition of the previous building on the site—the 1950s office block Bowater House—took place between July and December 2006. Construction work began in January 2007. The superstructure of the building was completed in March 2009. Fitting-out of the building began in April 2009. In August 2010, a penthouse in the development was rumoured to be sold for £140 million, making it the most expensive residential property in Britain. It was also announced that McLaren Automotive would be opening a car showroom in the building in early 2011. As part of the construction of One Hyde Park, a new entrance to Knightsbridge tube station was built. This opened in December 2010

In January 2011, a newspaper report at the time of the development's launch party indicated that according to Land Registry records the sale of only five properties had been completed. As of 2013, there was little evidence of people actually living in the complex. In September 2013 it was reported that a one-bedroom apartment in the complex worth £5.25m had been repossessed.

The sculpture Search for Enlightenment by Simon Gudgeon was unveiled on 19 January 2012 to mark the first anniversary of One Hyde Park. The bronze sculpture is of two human profiles, one male and the other female and faces Hyde Park and the Serpentine.

In February 2026, a group of tenants won a court case against Laing O'Rourke, the building's main contractor, to replace the complex's pipes and stop reoccurring leaks.

== Tax issues ==
In November 2011, it was reported that only nine out of the 62 apartments that had been sold at One Hyde Park were registered with Westminster City Council for Council Tax. Despite prices ranging from £3.6 million for a one-bedroom flat to £136 million for a penthouse, only four properties were paying the full £755.60 a year Council Tax plus the £619.64 Greater London Authority charge (collectively below the national average), while five were paying the Council Tax at the 50% reduction for a second home. Westminster North MP Karen Buck stated: "When council spending is under unprecedented pressure, it is scandalous that residents in luxury apartments can avoid their share of council tax liability. It sometimes seems as if the more money you have the less you are required to pay." Nicholas Shaxson from Vanity Fair discovered that 60 apartments are owned by companies registered in tax havens as foreign companies and therefore don't have to pay taxes on the apartments. The owners of many of the companies remain anonymous.
