= Real estate in the United Kingdom =

British land and property

Real estate is a significant feature of the economy of the United Kingdom, and regulated according to Scottish and English land law. The real estate market in the United Kingdom is the largest or second-largest in Europe (after Germany) depending on the method of measurement. The commercial real estate market in the UK has a market size of around 250billion euros. Domestic real estate represented the largest non-financial asset in the UK, with a net worth of £5.1trillion (2014). Foreign investment plays a substantial role in the UK's real estate market, particularly in London, and foreign companies and individuals invested around £20billion in UK real estate in 2012.

== Chinese interest ==
Chinese developers and investors have increasingly seen that the UK government gives support and encouragement to these projects, making London seem like the ideal area when looking at European markets for higher returns and strong growth. Hoping to aim for the desire and need of being seen as a hub for diversification and safety in the eyes of its investors, which is a successful venture considering its political and economic stability. Elections and other political events that occur regularly have a small impact on the legal system. After the UK accepted seven different Chinese banks, the government was eager to show their support by being the first outside of China to issue Renminbi Bonds and reflect the commitment of Chinese investors to the UK market. International standards, of which the Chinese have a thirst for knowledge, and a strong growth profile are also key attractions of the UK market.

The Brexit referendum and the corresponding fall in the value of the pound has given new impetus to Chinese buyers of British property. Growth in enquiries into UK property have jumped 60% over the prior 12 months. In related research, The Times found that more than 93 per cent of flats in one of Manchester's biggest housing developments have been bought by foreign residents or companies registered overseas.

== Online real estate market ==
The UK has a booming online real estate market which is dominated by portals which list properties for buyers and sellers and work with agents, charging them for their inventory. While the online real estate landscape has been changing over the years, new models have been introduced which focus on a freemium approach, not charging agents anything for listings but making money from selling add-ons and leads.

Moreover, UK's real estate portals are pushing the boundaries by adapting to the latest technological advances. Virtual reality, which is more prominent in video games, was accommodated by real estate listing portals to highlight the possibility of touring properties remotely. Furthermore, UK real estate developers even started to allow customers to walk-through apartments even before they are built.

Waltham Forest in London and Bridgend, Wales, both saw properties selling in an average of 24 days, the second-highest rate reported. However, the country's East and West Midlands regions had the greatest number of the U.K.’s fastest-moving real estate markets.

== See also ==
- English land law
- Housing in the United Kingdom
