= Ivan Harbour =

British architect

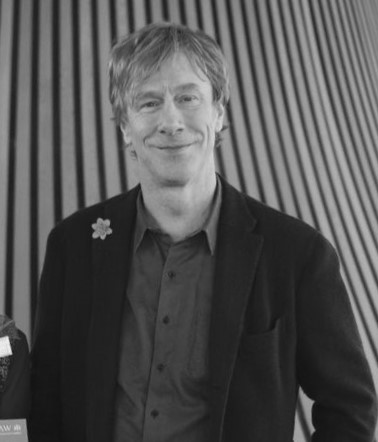
- Born: June 3, 1962 (age 64); Irvine, Scotland
- Education: Bartlett School of Architecture
- Occupation: Architect
- Awards: Stirling Prize (2006 and 2009)
- Practice: RSHP
- Buildings: Lloyd's building (Grade I); European Court of Human Rights building Senedd, Cardiff; Terminal 4 of Madrid-Barajas Airport; Maggie's Centre, London
- Website: www.rsh-p.com/practice/people/partners/ivan-harbour/

Ivan William Harbour (born 3 June 1962) is an architect and senior partner at RSHP. He joined the Richard Rogers Partnership in 1985 and by 2007 the name of the practice changed to Rogers Stirk Harbour + Partners in recognition of Graham Stirk and Harbour's contribution to the firm, later renamed RSHP, after the death of Richard Rogers.

He has been the leading architect on two Stirling Prize winning entries for the practice in 2006 and 2009 for Terminal 4 of Madrid-Barajas Airport and Maggie's Centre, London respectively.

== Early life and career ==
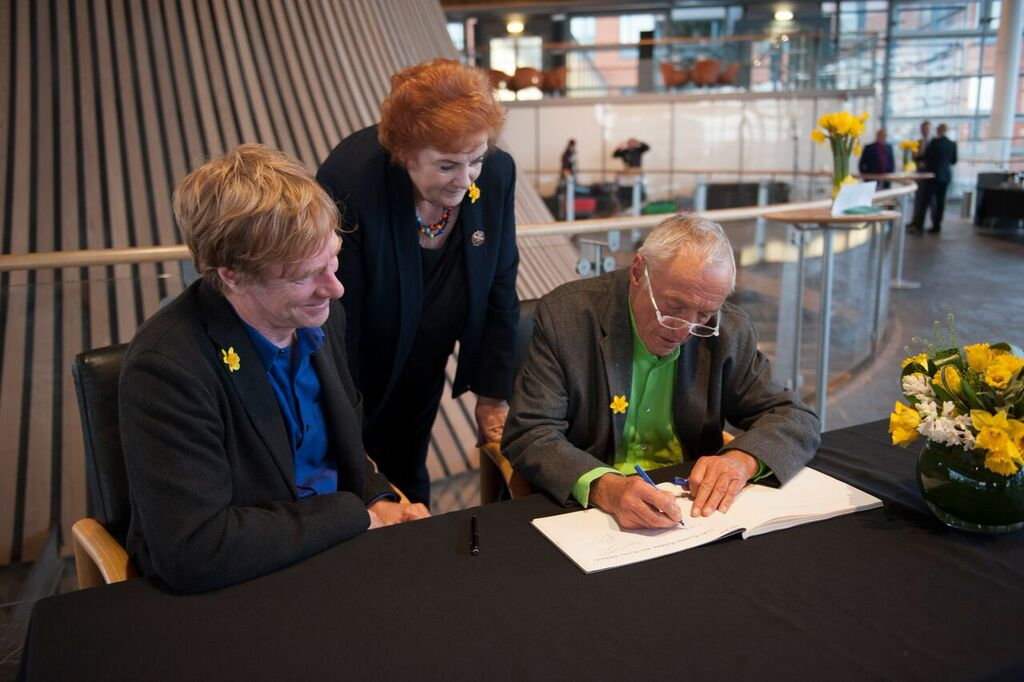
From left to right: Ivan Harbour, Rosemary Butler (Presiding Officer of the National Assembly for Wales) and Richard Rogers at the Senedd in March 2016

Harbour was born in 1962 in Irvine, Scotland. However he was brought up in the West Country. Harbour joined the Richard Rogers Partnership in 1985 after studying architecture at the Bartlett School of Architecture, University College London, where he obtained a Bachelor of Science degree (BSc (Hons)) during 1980-83 and a Diploma in Architecture (Dipl. Arch.) in 1985.

During 1983 he joined Yorke Rosenberg Mardall (YRM) as part of his studies and in 1984-85 he was with the London Borough of Hackney. After his studies he joined the Richard Rogers Partnership in 1985 and was made a director of in 1993. In 1998 he was made a director of the practice and by 2007 the name of the practice changed from Richard Rogers Partnership to Rogers Stirk Harbour + Partners. In 2011 he was made a senior partner in the firm. The practice is now known as RSHP.

The Guardian's Charlotte Higgins described Harbour's work, in comparison with fellow partner Graham Stirk, to be "more expressive and sculptural" such as Madrid airport's brightly coloured Terminal 4.

== Notable works ==
When Harbour joined Rogers Stirk Harbour + Partners in 1985, he started as part of a team working on the Richard Rogers Lloyd's building in London. He has gone on to lead design teams on the European Court of Human Rights building, the Bordeaux Law Courts, and winning the Stirling Prize for the practice in 2006 and 2009 for Terminal 4 of Madrid-Barajas Airport and Maggie's Centre, London respectively.

=== Images of a selection of Ivan Harbour's work ===
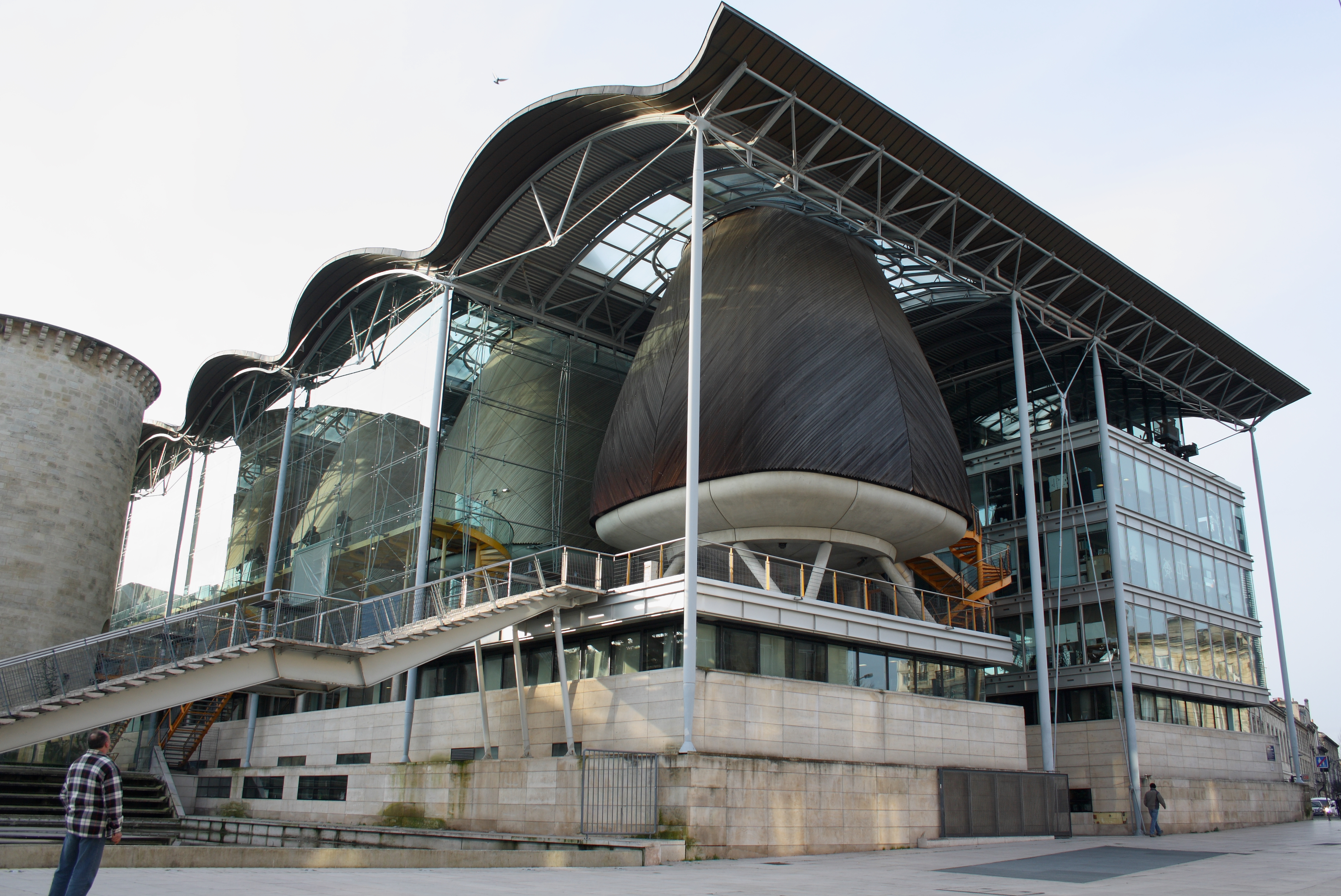
Bordeaux Law Courts, Bordeaux, France

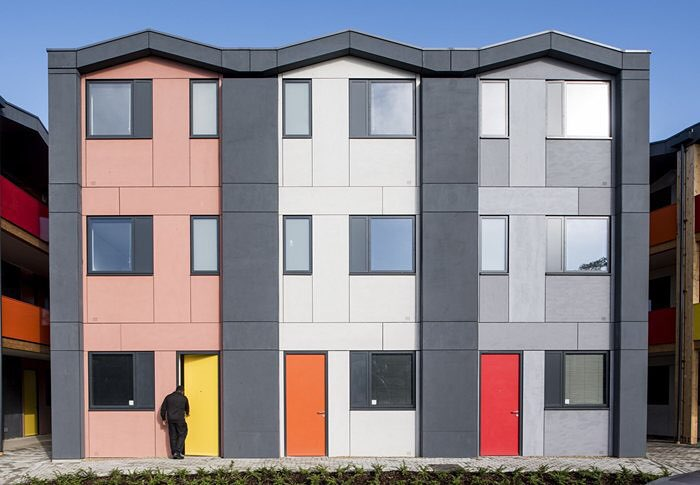
Y:Cube, London

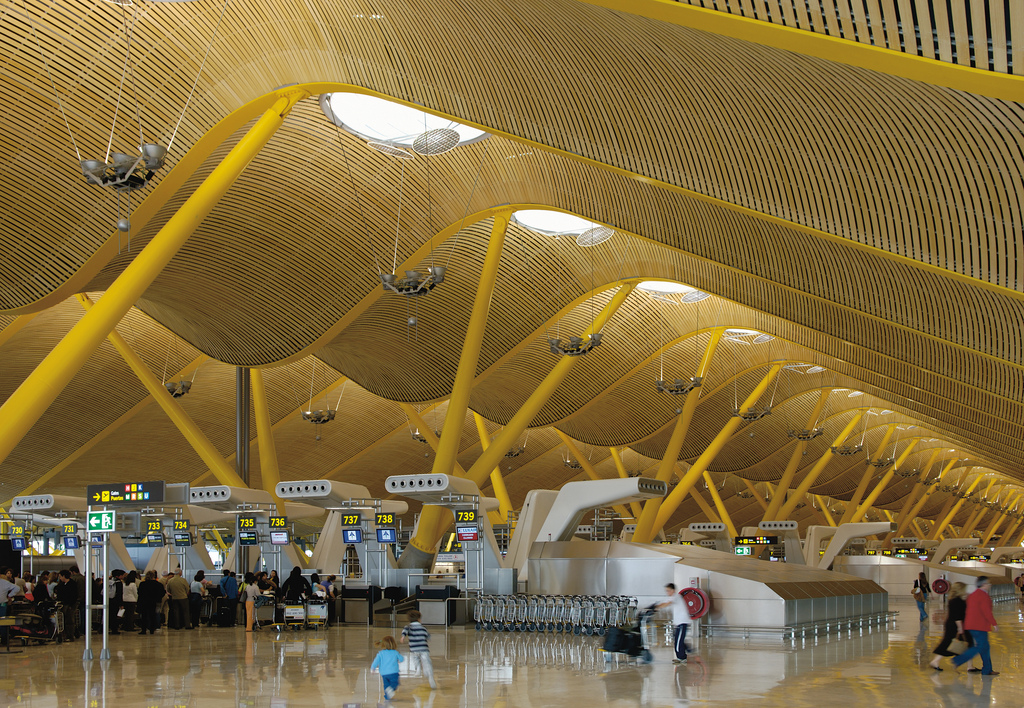
Terminal 4 Barajas Airport, Madrid, Spain

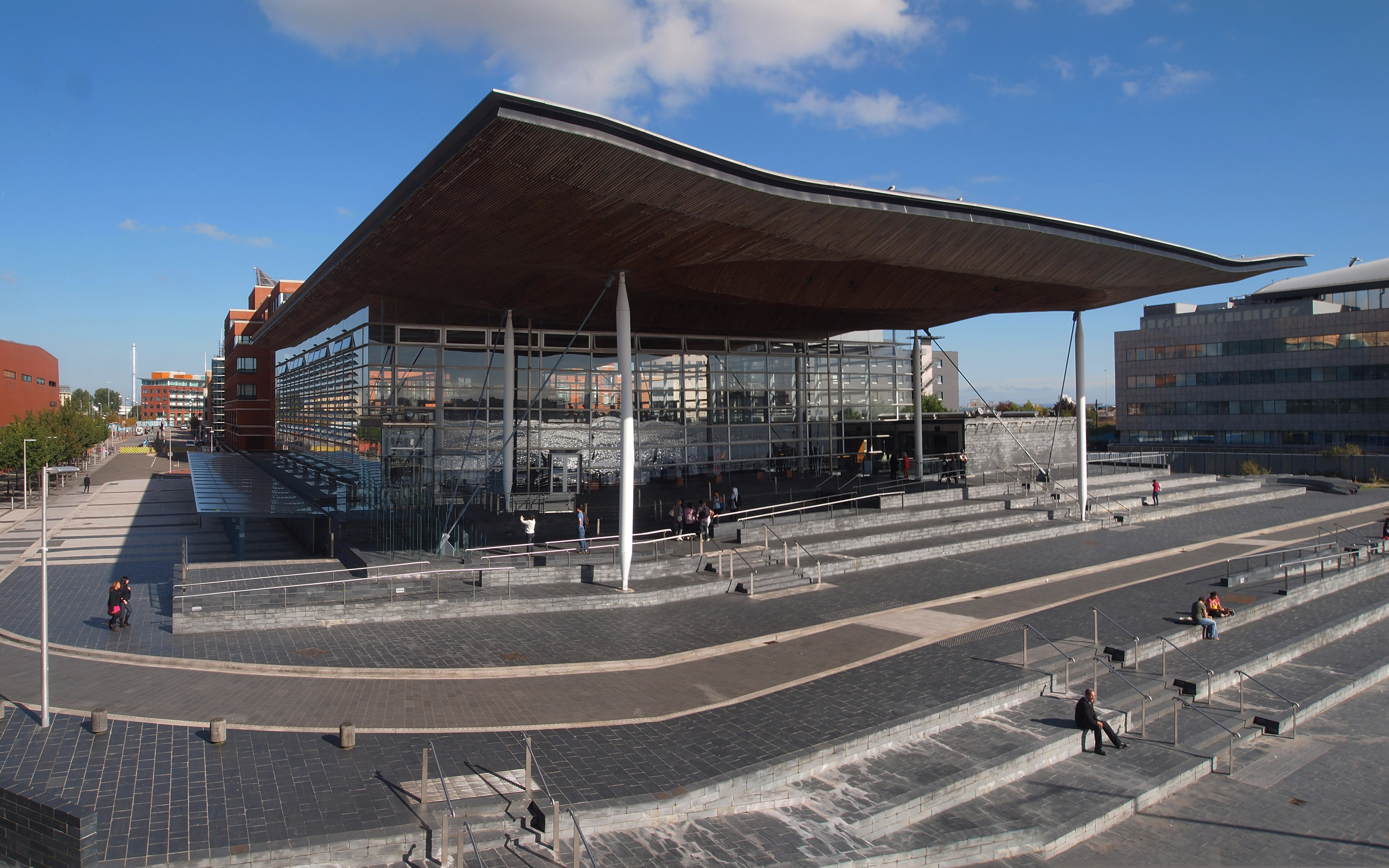
Senedd, National Assembly for Wales, Cardiff, Wales

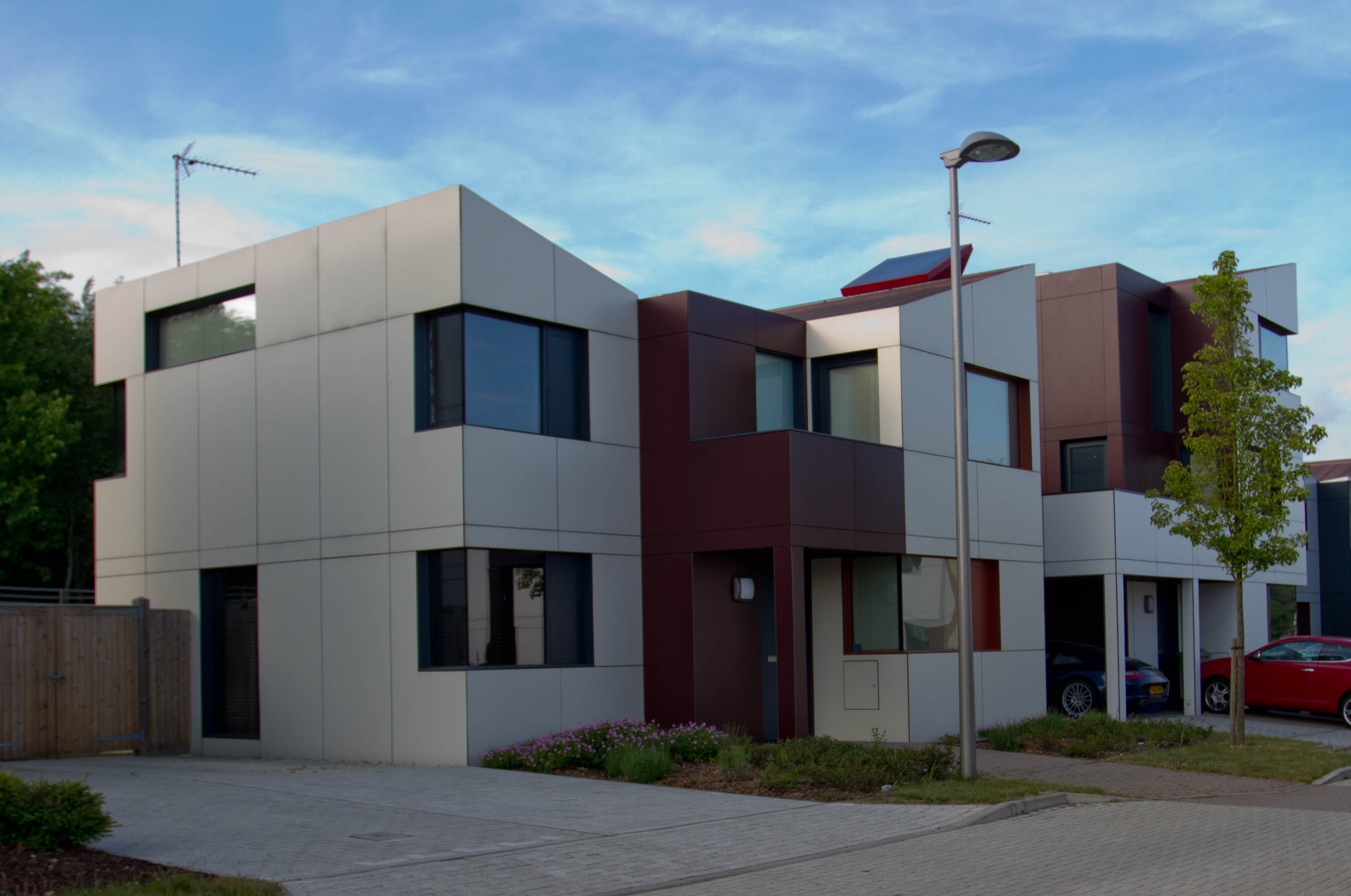
Oxley Woods housing development in Milton Keynes, England

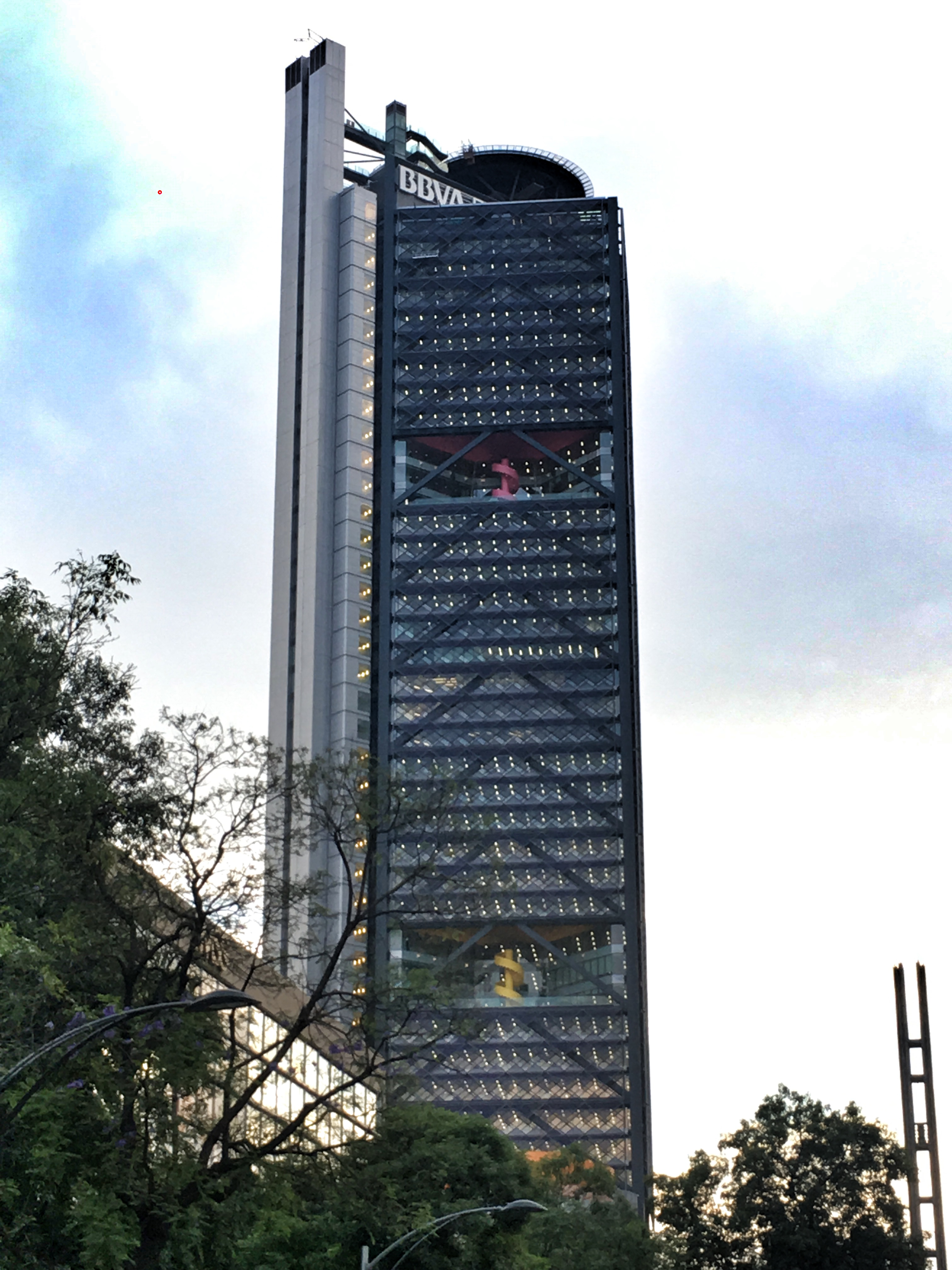
Torre BBVA Bancomer, Mexico.

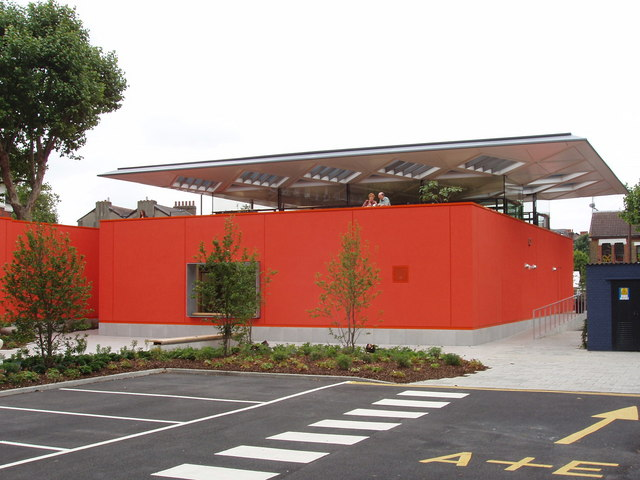
Maggie's Centre, London

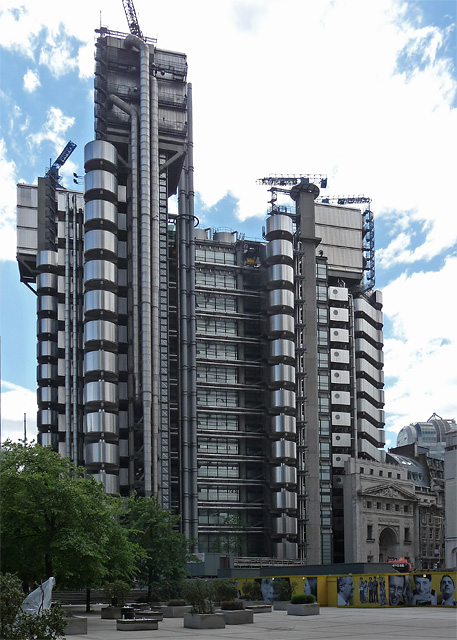
Lloyd's building, London

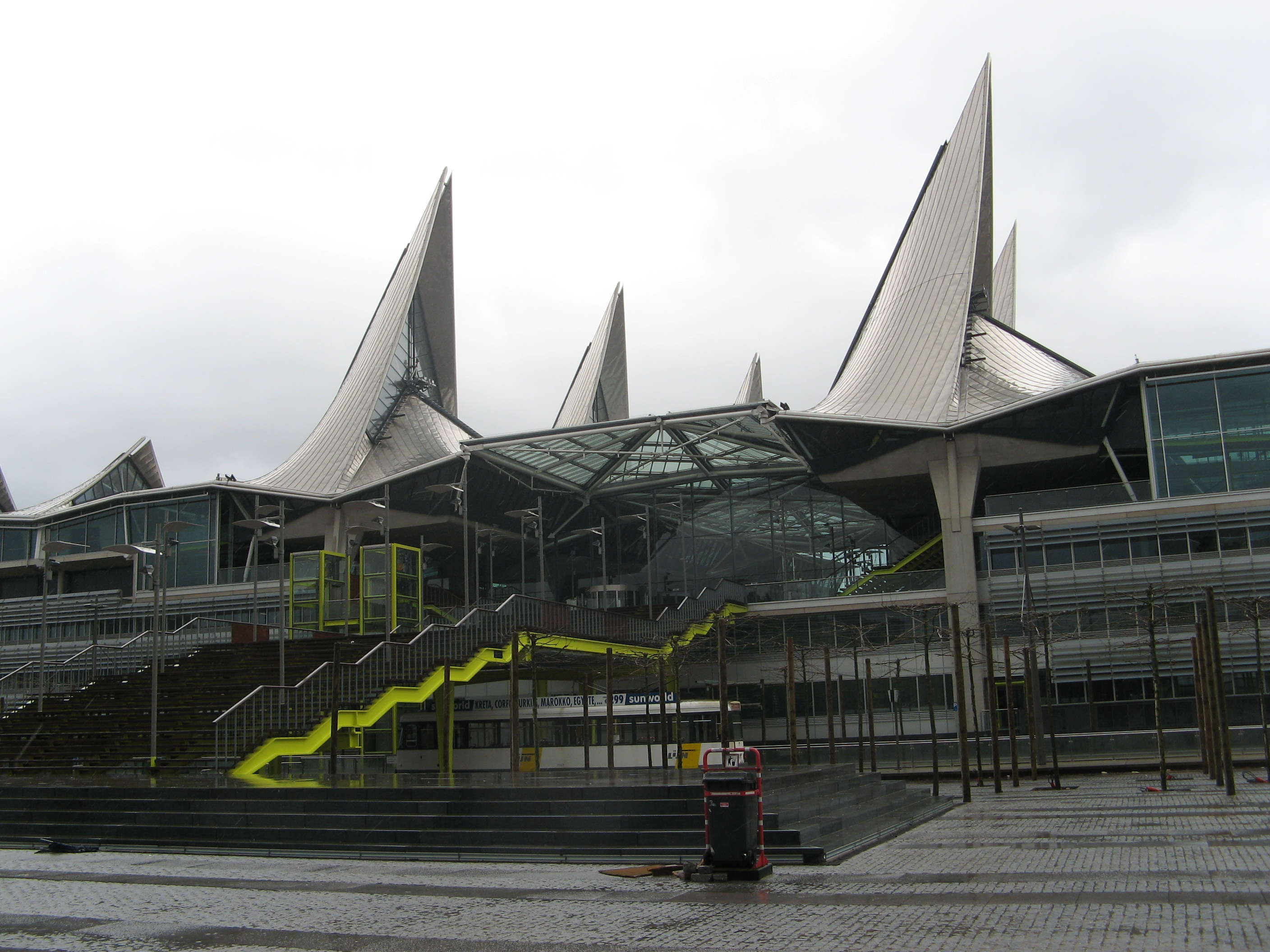
Antwerp Law Courts, Antwerp, Belgium

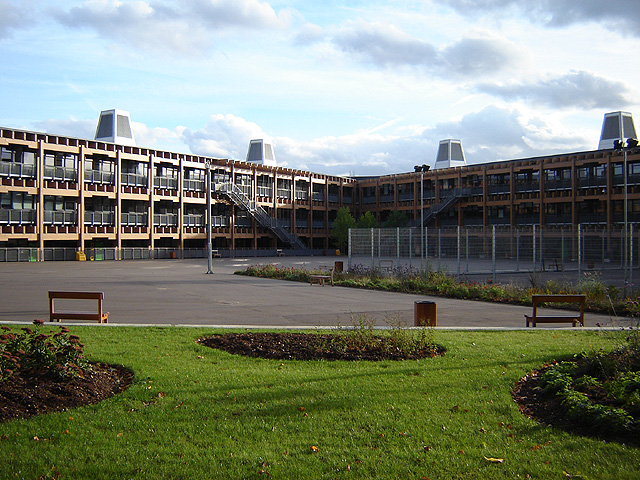
Mossbourne Community Academy, London

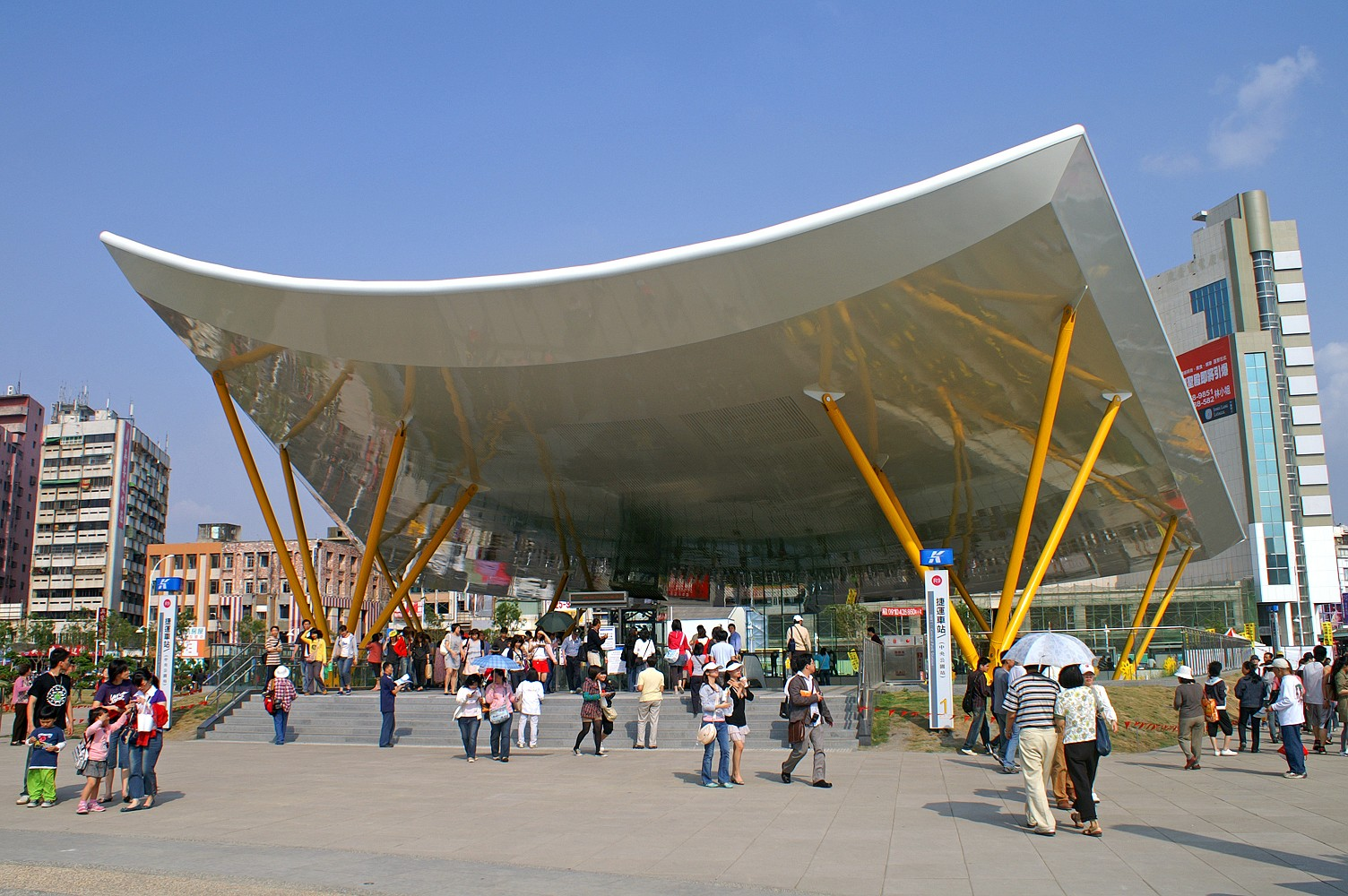
R9 Station, Kaohsiung, Taiwan

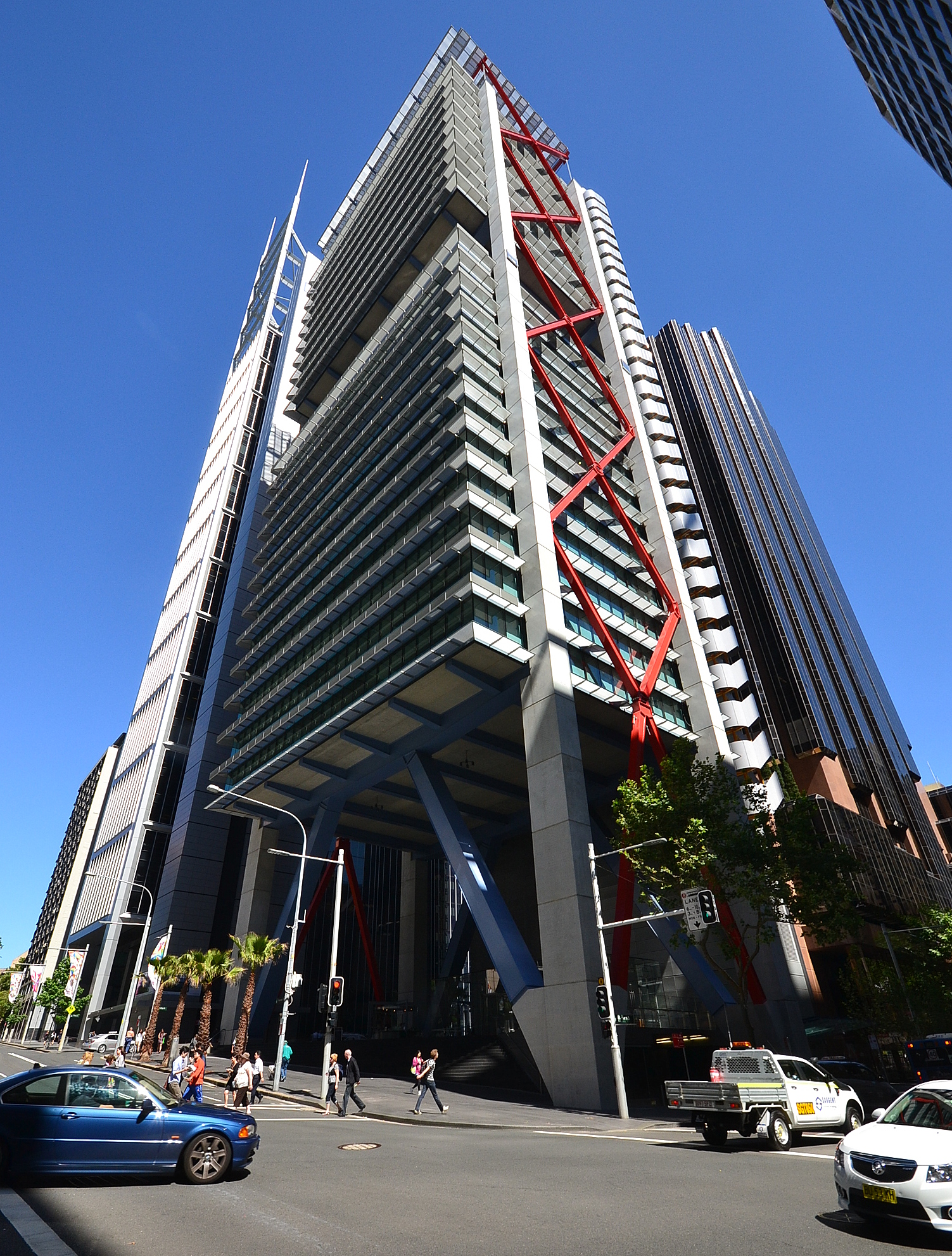
8 Chifley, Sydney, Australia

Other projects that have been designed / led by Harbour includes:

- Barangaroo masterplan, Sydney, Australia
- 300 New Jersey Avenue offices, Washington DC, USA
- Parc1, Seoul, South Korea
- International Quarter masterplan, London.
- PLACE / Ladywell, London
- Nuovo Centro Civico, Scandicci, Italy

== See also ==
- List of architects
