= Graham Stirk =

British architect

- Born: January 8, 1957 (age 69); Leeds, England
- Education: Oxford Polytechnic; Architectural Association; Kingston Polytechnic
- Occupation: Architect
- Practice: RSHP
- Buildings: 124 Horseferry Road (Channel 4 building); Montevetro, London; 88 Wood Street; NEO Bankside, London; 71 Fenchurch Street (Lloyd’s Register of Shipping building); 122 Leadenhall Street

Graham Carl Stirk (born 8 January 1957) is an architect and senior partner at RSHP. He joined the Richard Rogers Partnership in 1983 and by 2007 the name of the practice changed to Rogers Stirk Harbour + Partners to reflect his contribution to the practice, along with Ivan Harbour, later renamed RSHP, after the death of Richard Rogers.

== Early life and career ==
Stirk was born in 1957 in Leeds, England, he joined the Richard Rogers Partnership in 1983 after studying at Oxford Polytechnic where he graduated with first-class honours degree (Bachelor of Science). He went on to study at the Architectural Association and Kingston Polytechnic. Stirk joined Richard Rogers Partnership in 1983 and was made a Senior Director in 1995.

After his studies he joined the Richard Rogers Partnership and was made a director in 1988, and by 2007 the name of the practice changed from Richard Rogers Partnership to Rogers Stirk Harbour + Partners in recognition of Ivan Harbour and Stirk's contribution to the firm. In 2011 he was made a senior partner in the firm. The practice is now known as RSHP.

== Major works ==
Since joining the practice, Stirk has gone on to lead the design teams on such projects as 88 Wood Street, One Hyde Park, 122 Leadenhall Street and Plaza de toros de las Arenas. He has also designed and led projects such as Lyon–Saint-Exupéry Airport, Terminal 1 and Burlington Gate, London.

=== Images of a selection of Graham Stirk's work ===
All projects in London, England, unless otherwise stated.

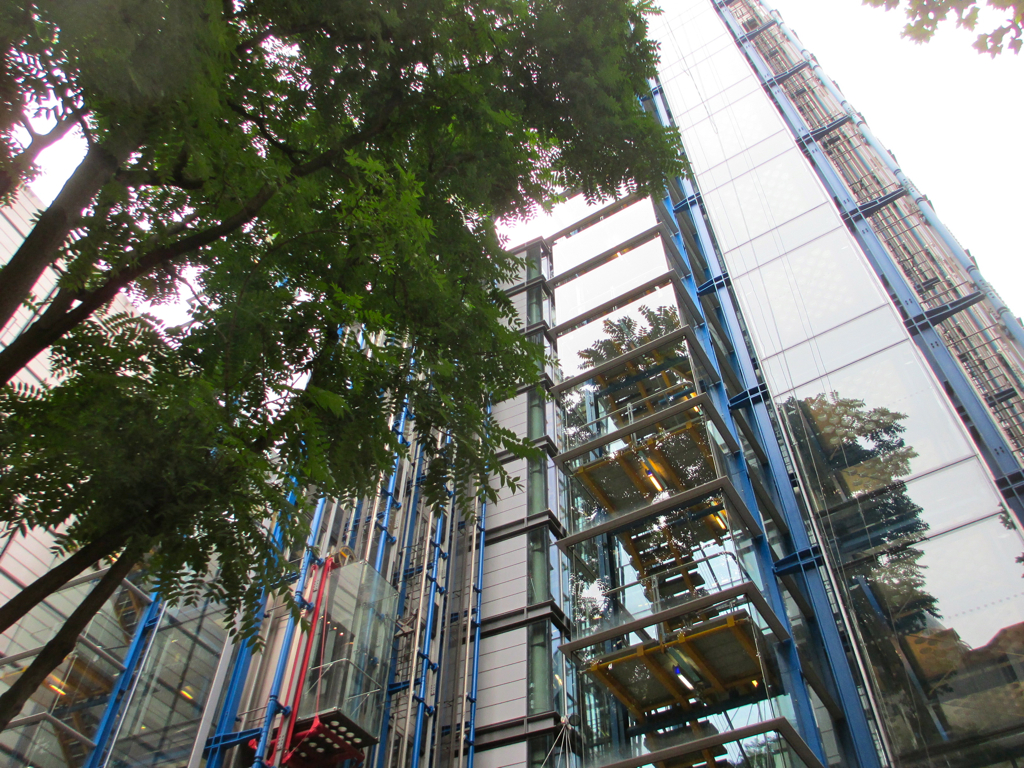
71 Fenchurch Street
(Lloyd's Register building)

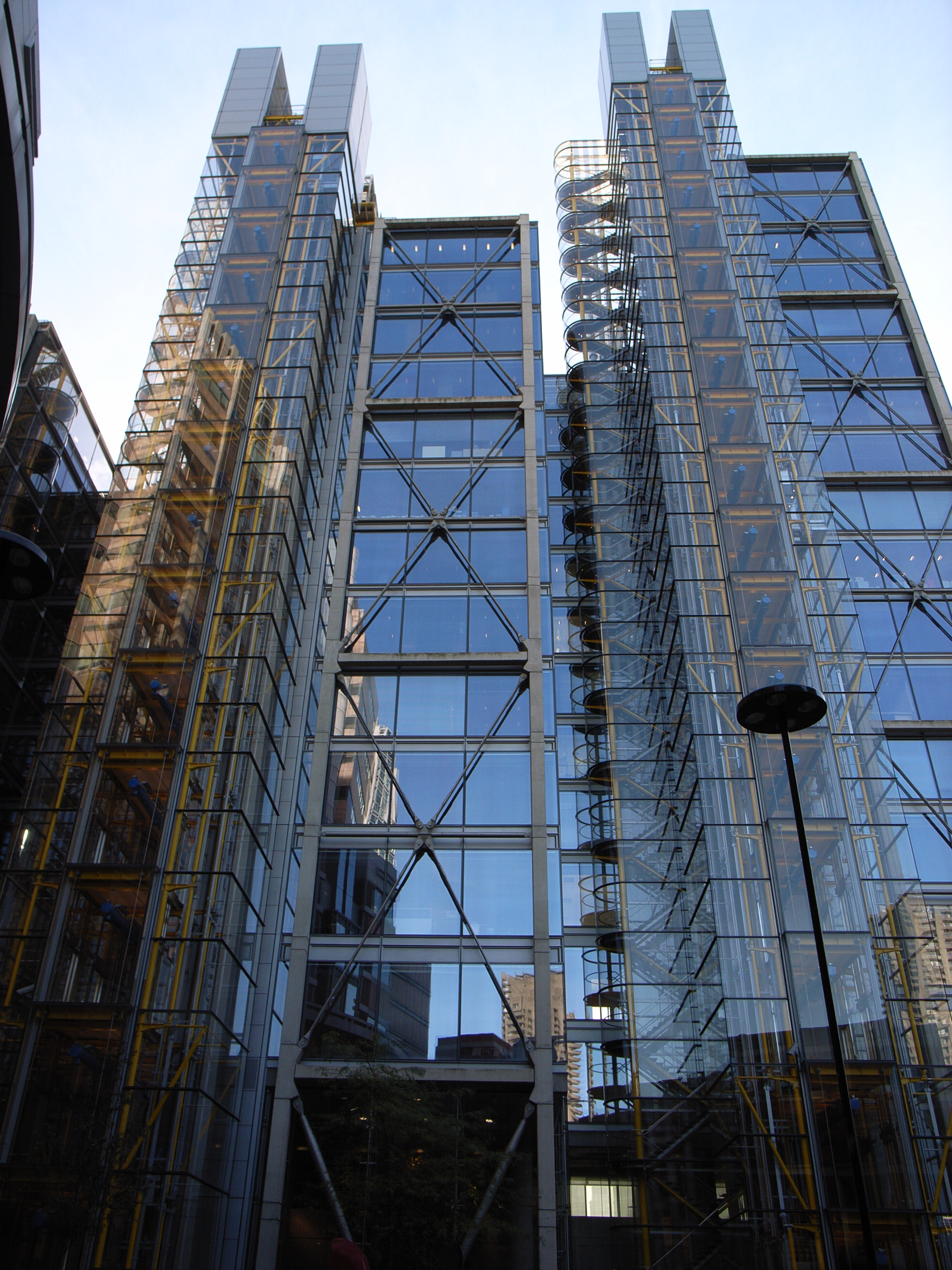
88 Wood Street

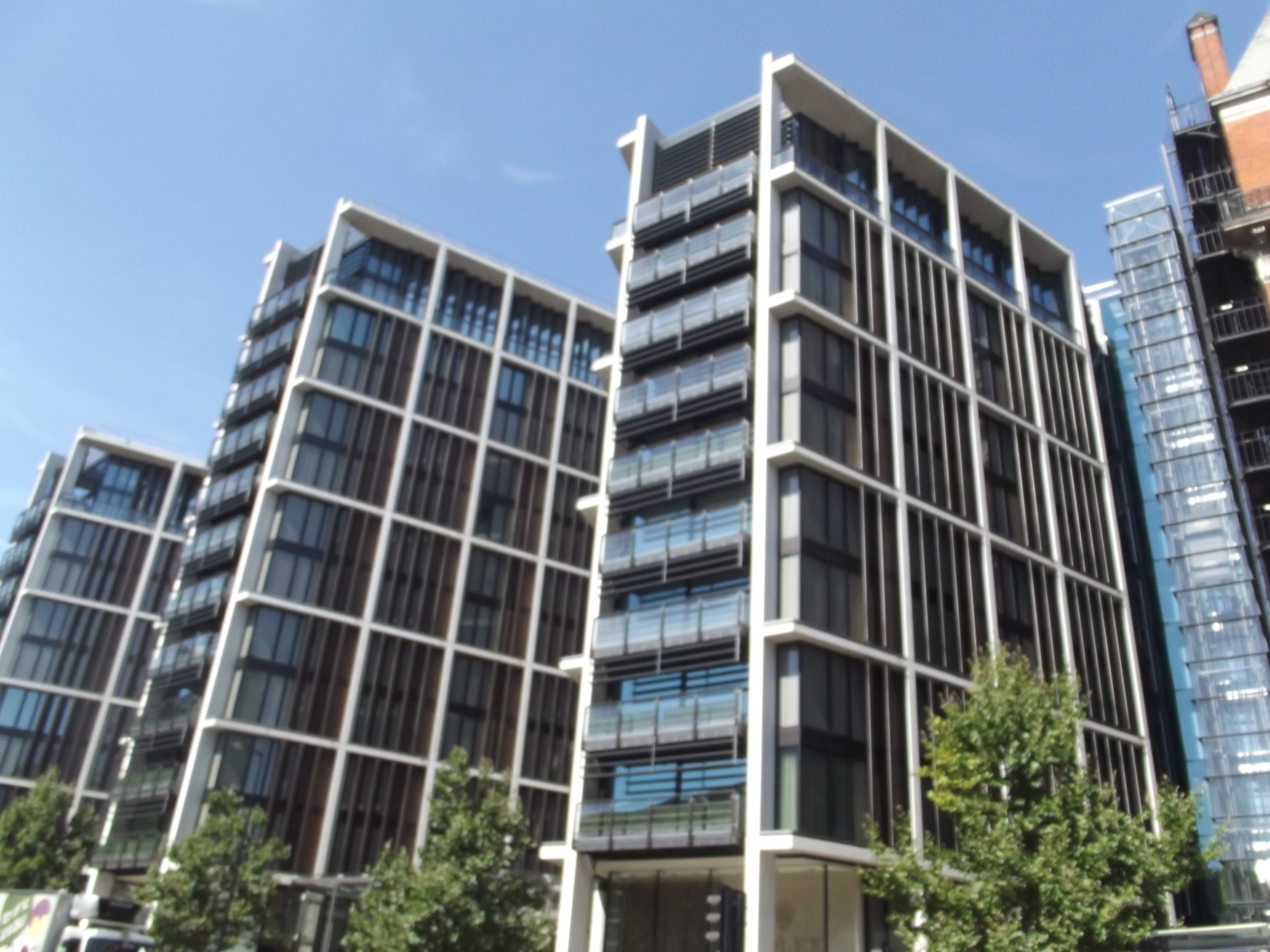
One Hyde Park

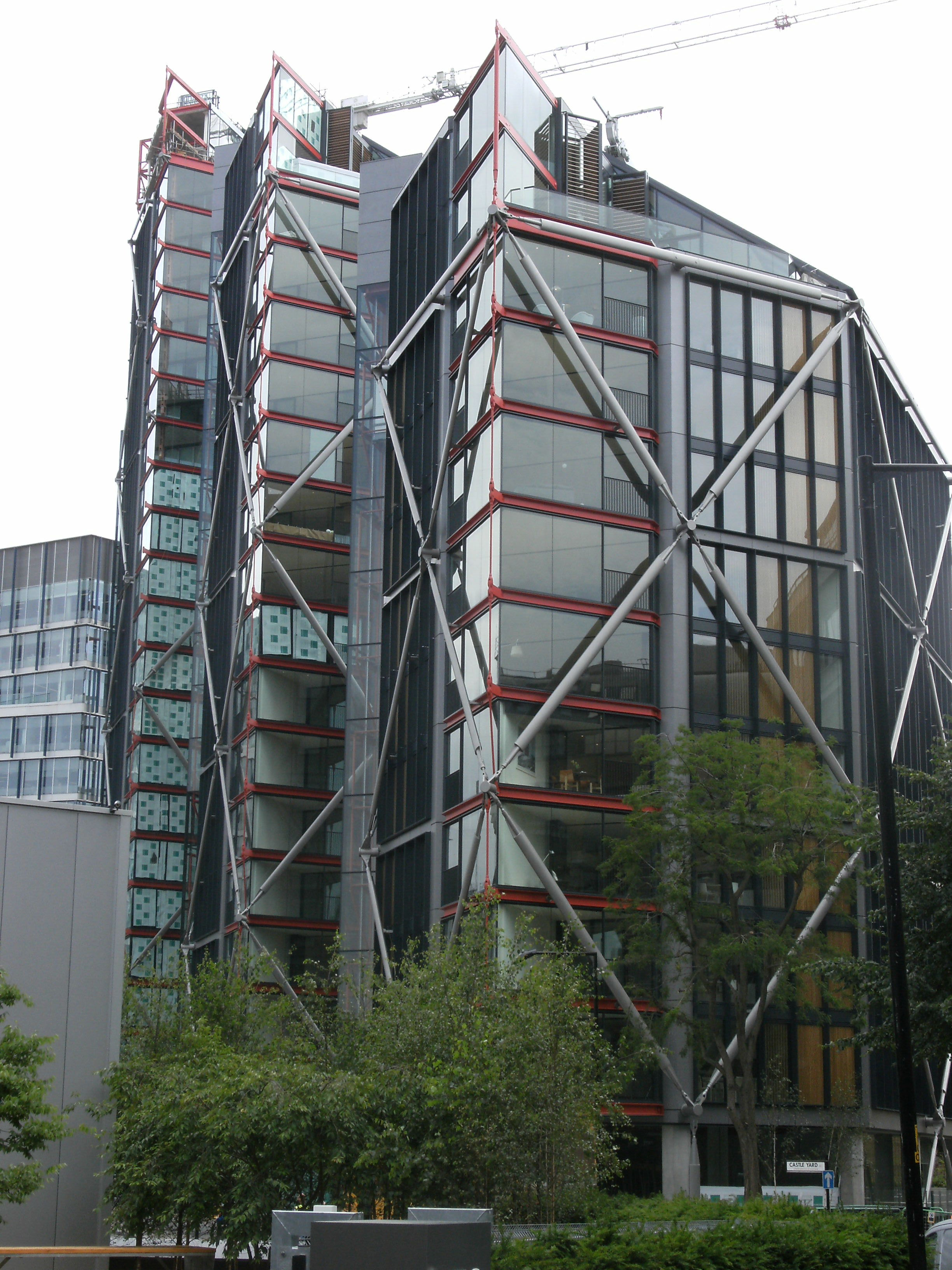
NEO Bankside, Holland Street

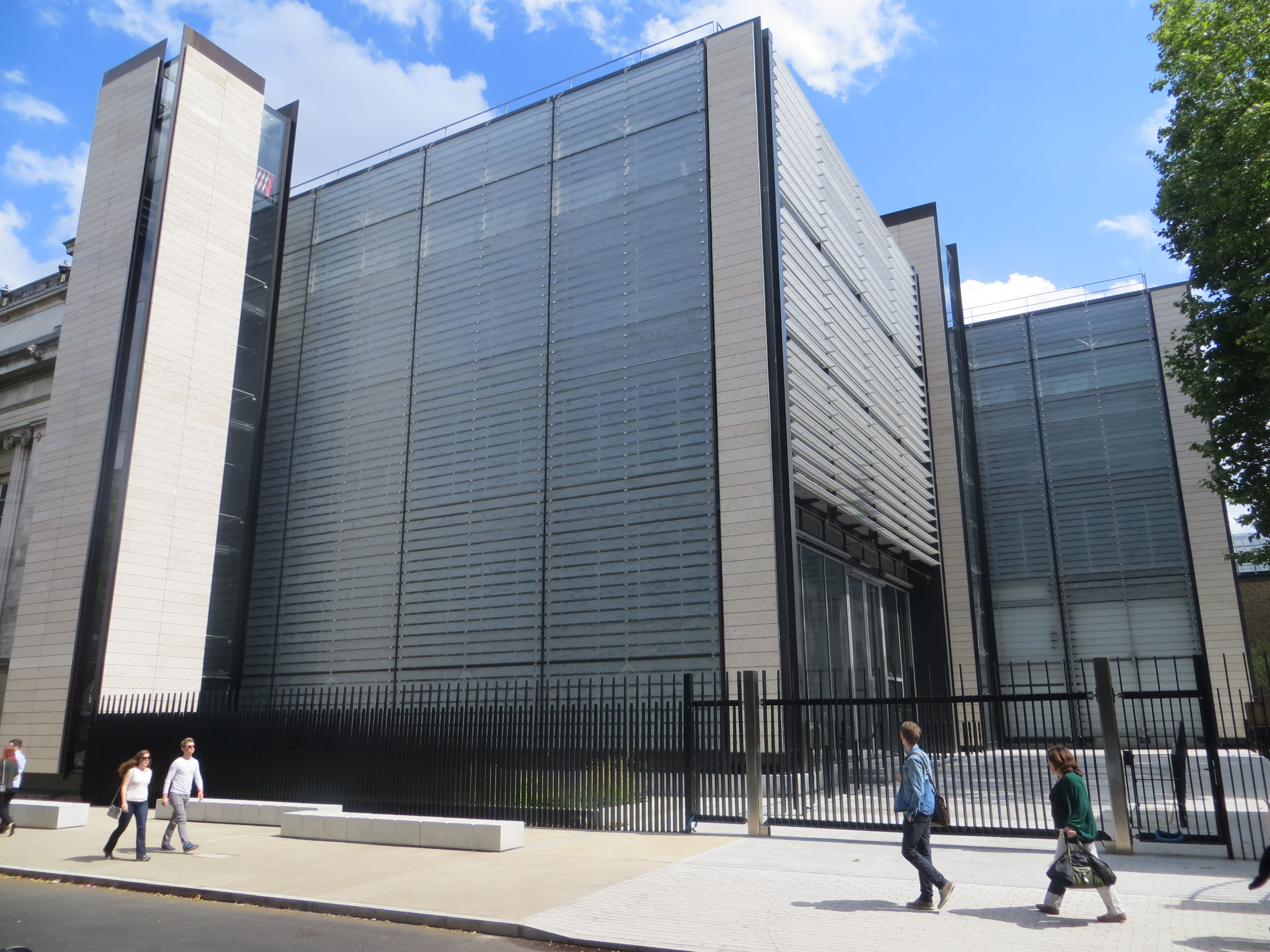
World Conservation and Exhibitions Centre
(British Museum)

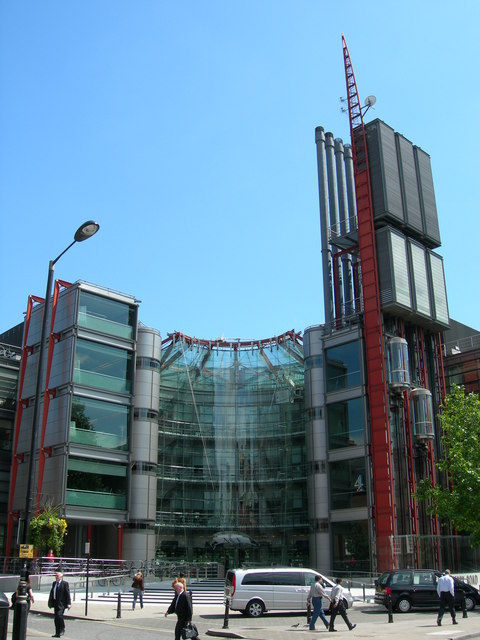
124 Horseferry Road
(Channel 4 HQ)

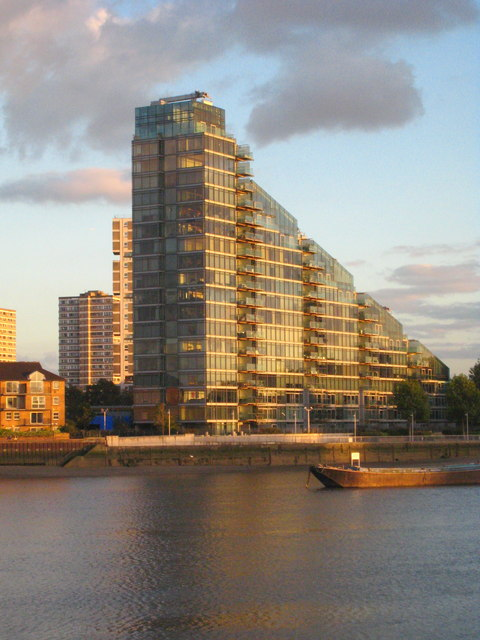
Montevetro,
100 Battersea Church Road

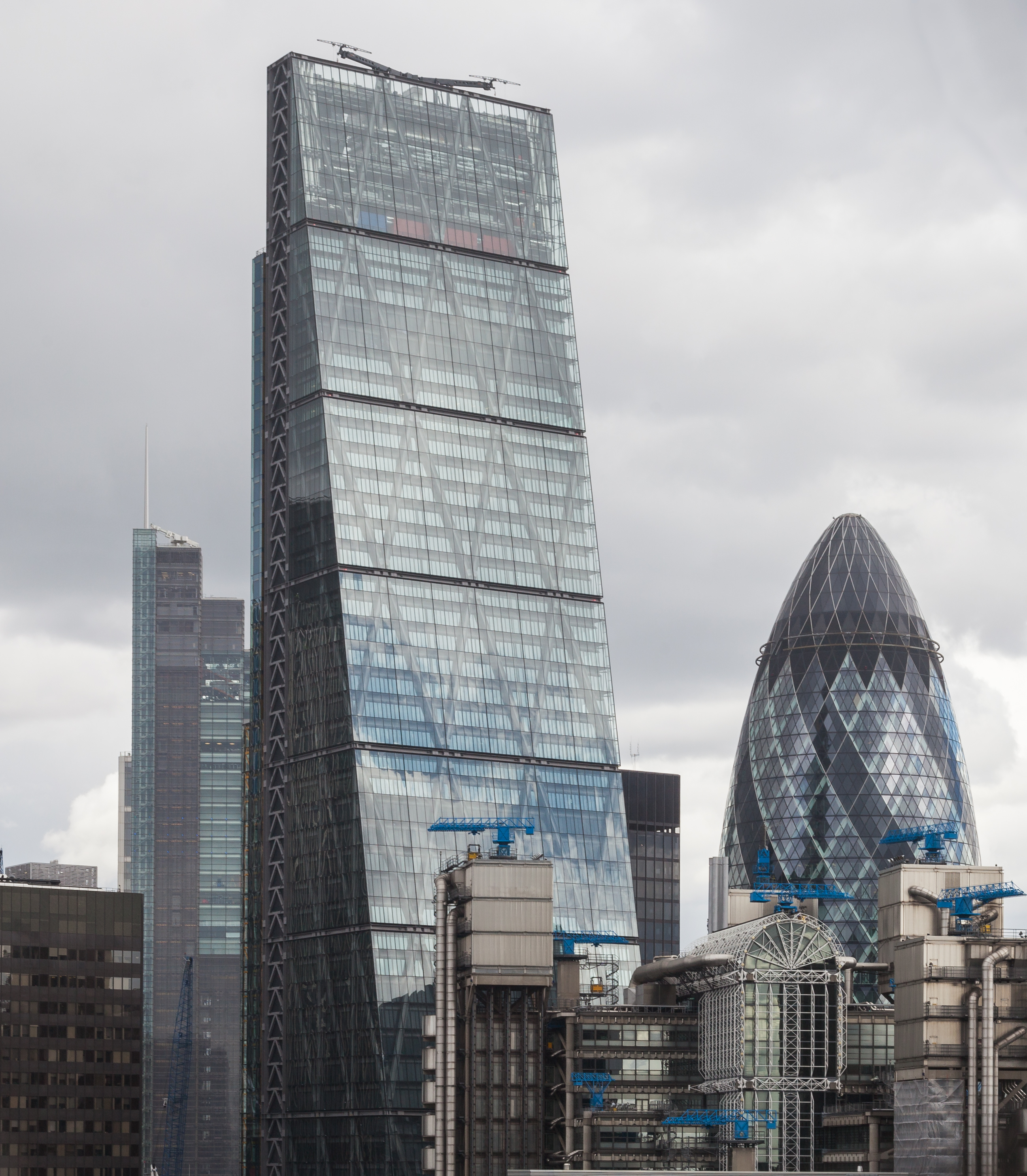
122 Leadenhall Street

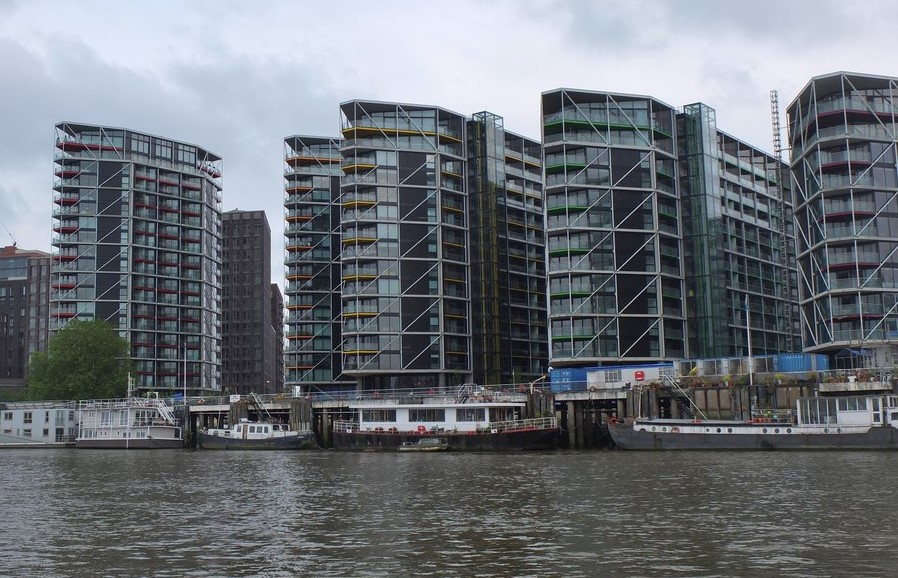
Riverlight, Nine Elms

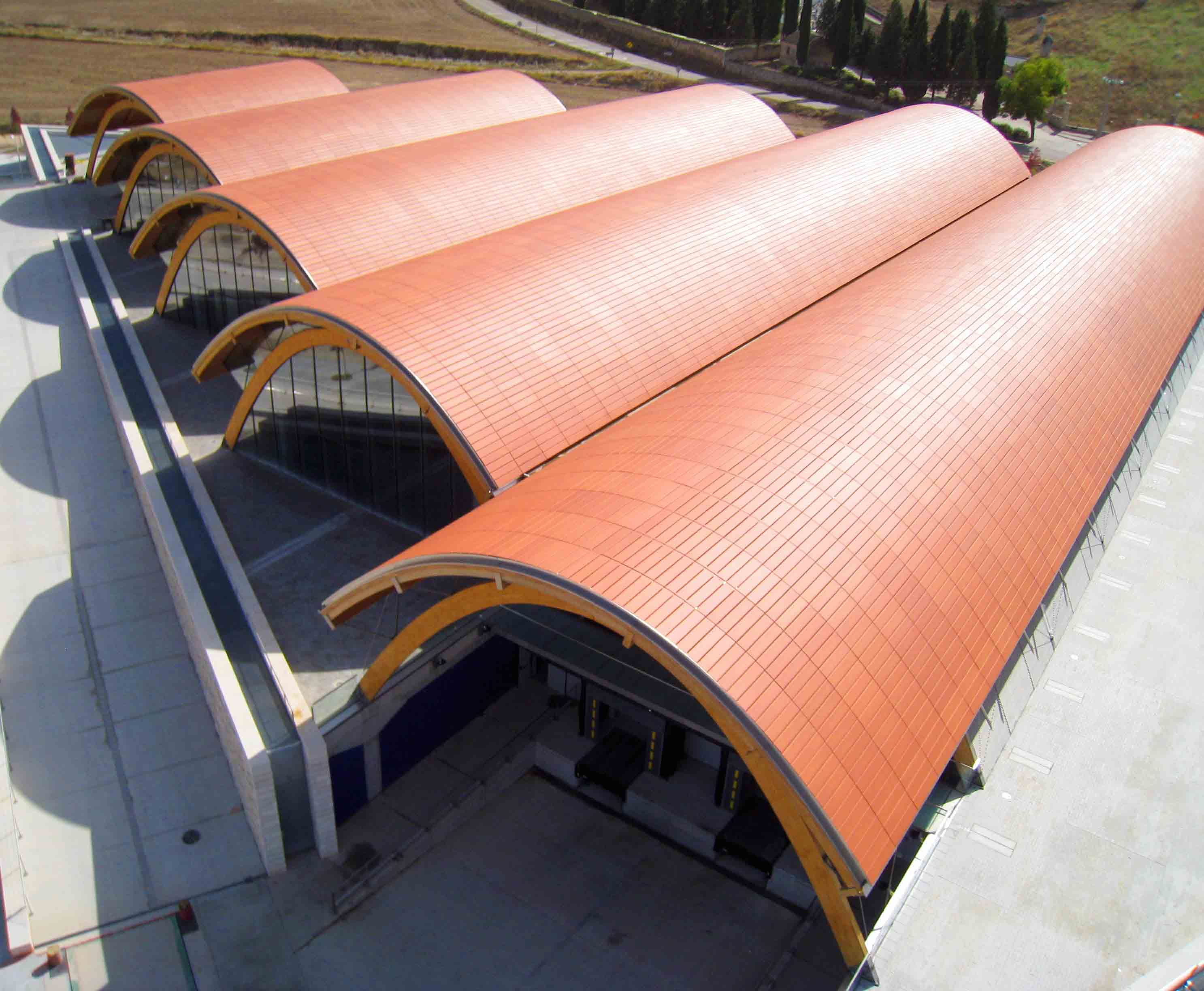
Bodegas Protos, Peñafiel, Spain

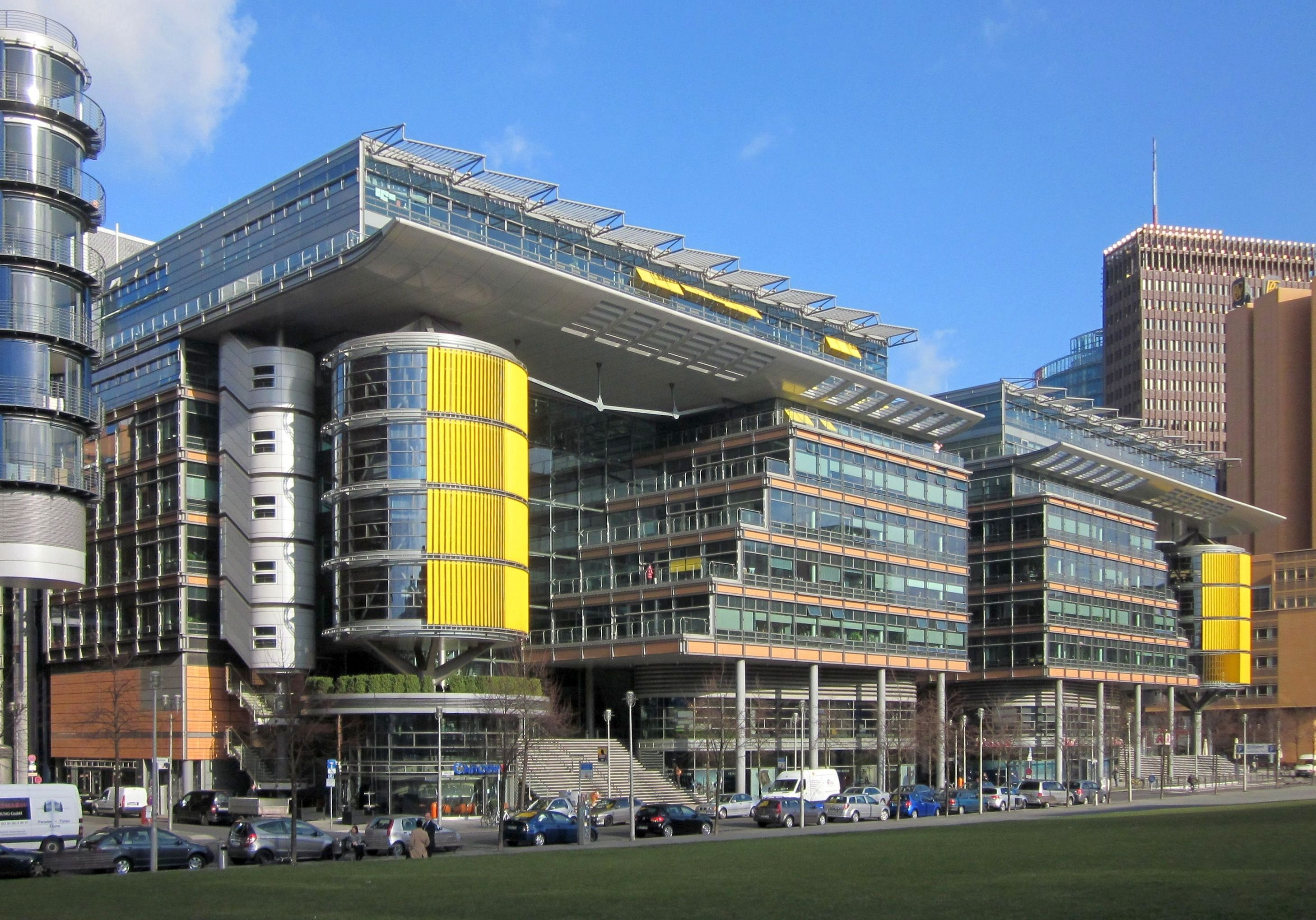
Linkstraße 2-4, Berlin, Germany

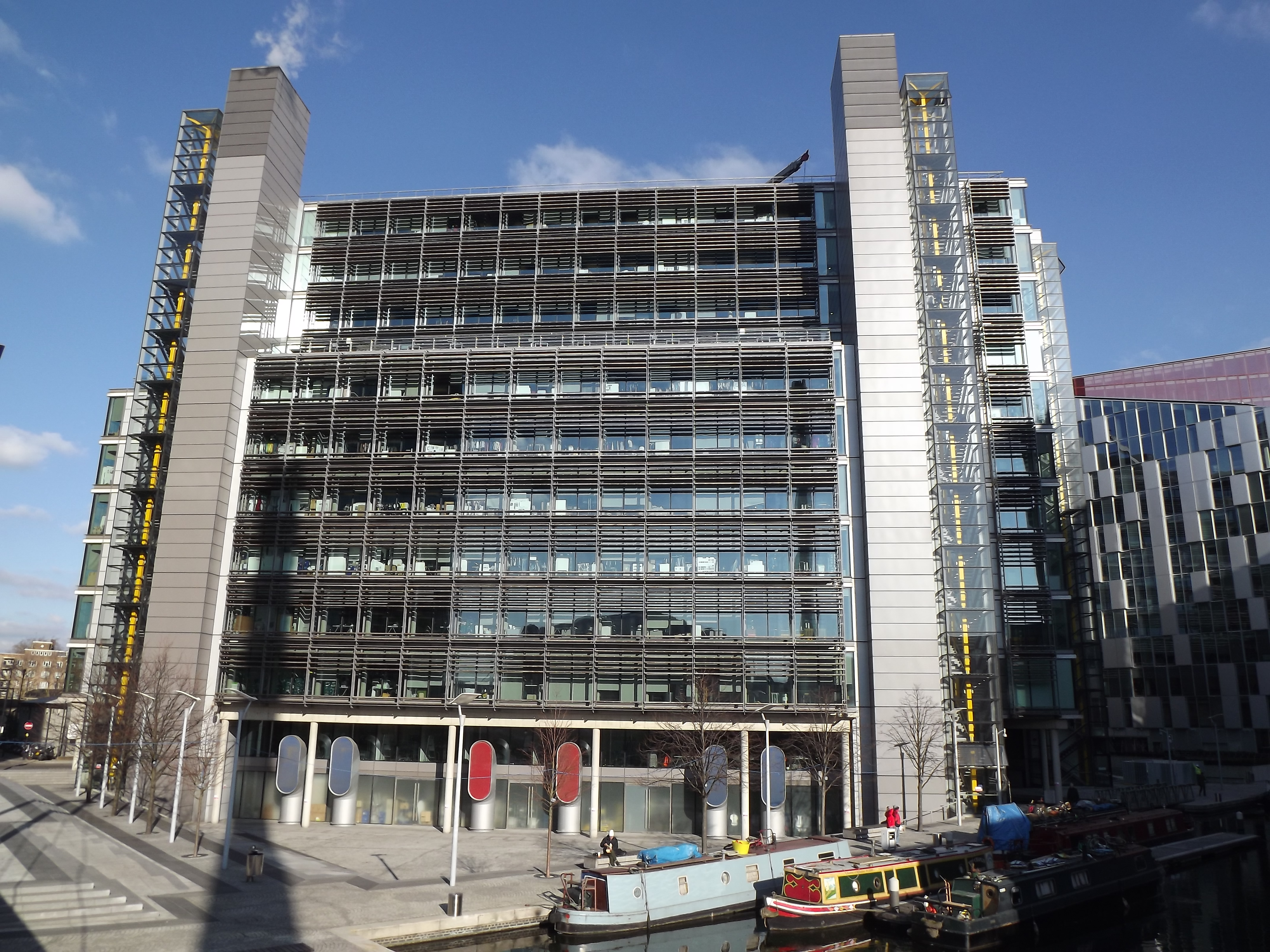
Waterside House, Paddington

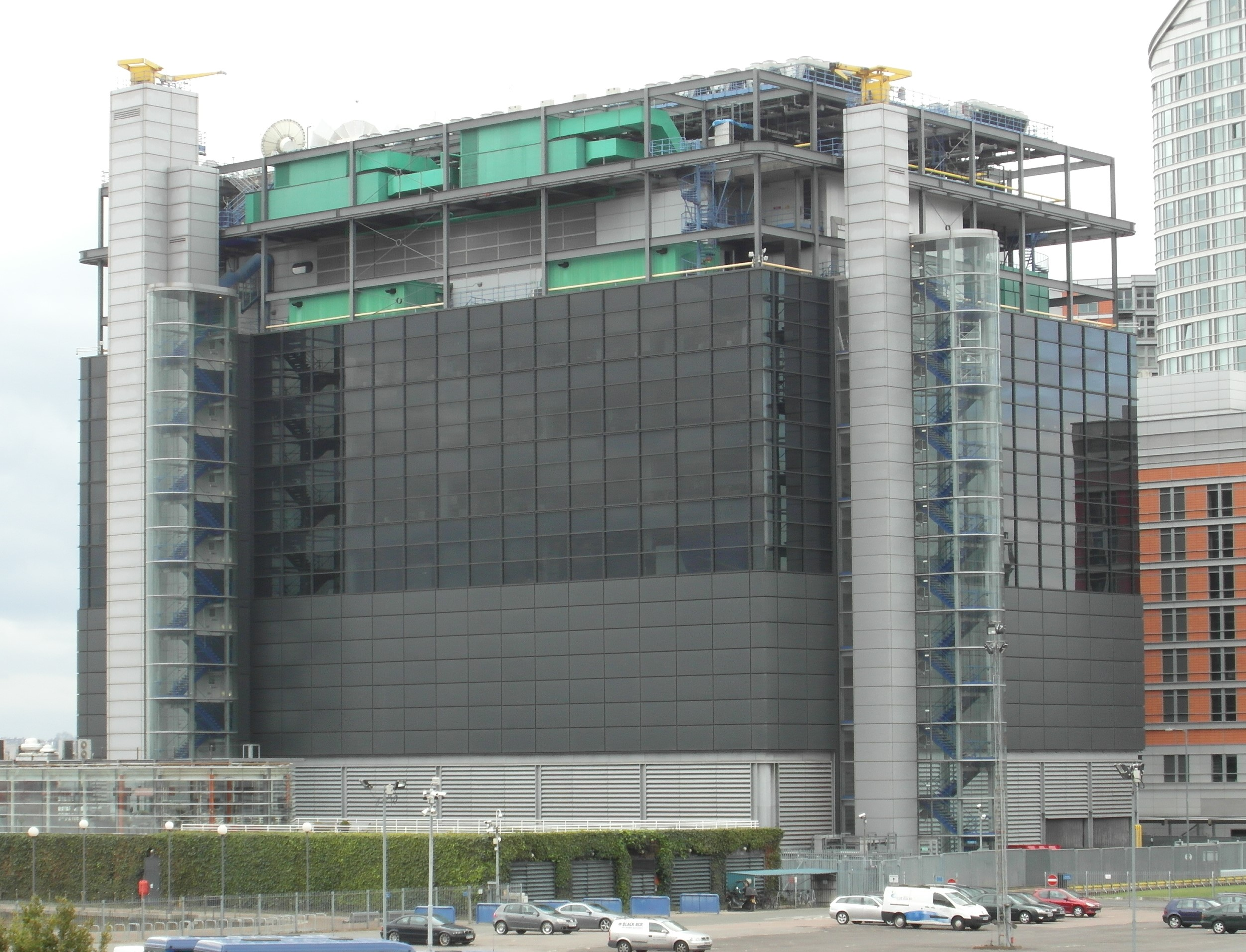
Reuters Data Centre

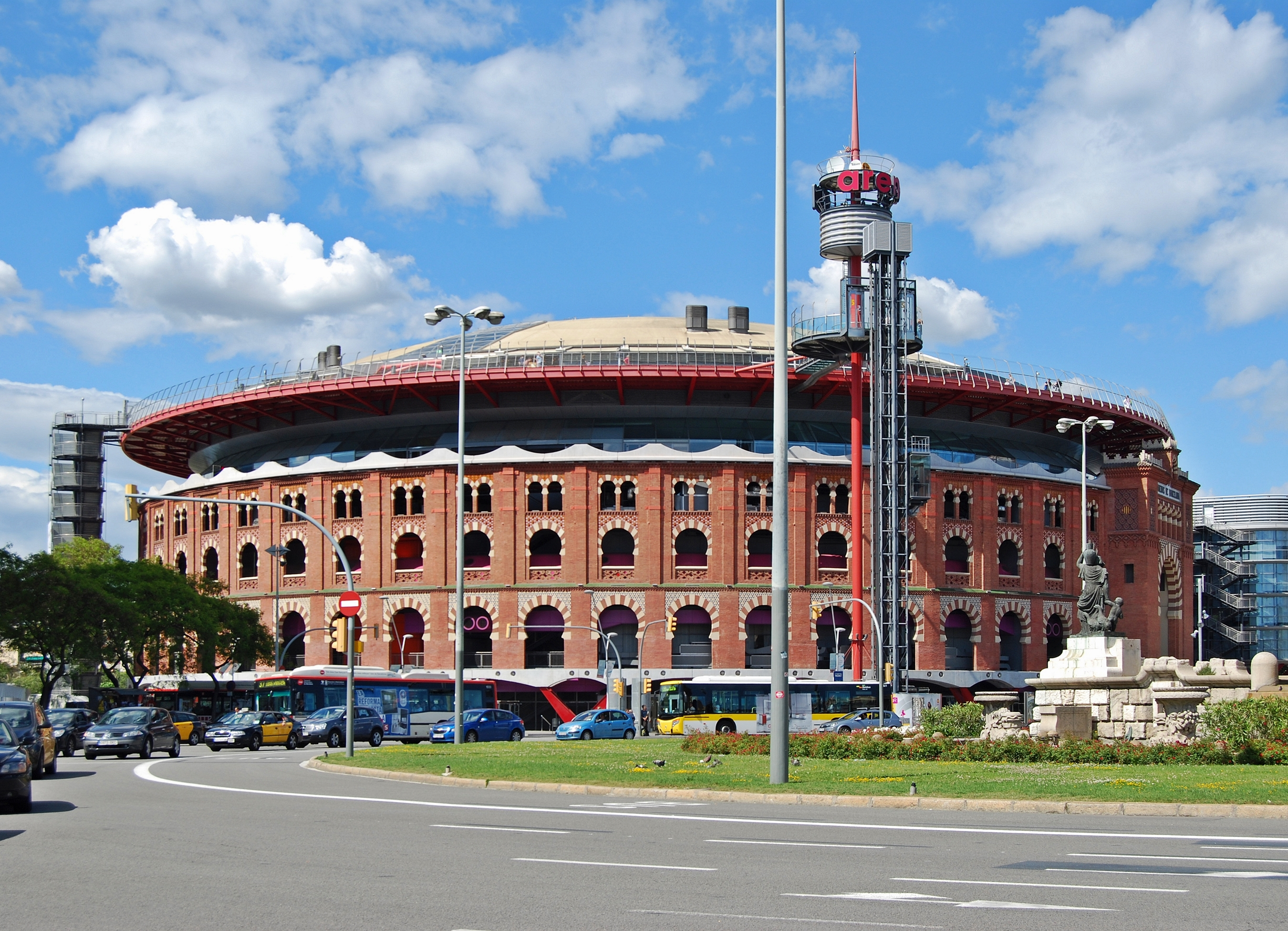
Plaza de toros de las Arenas, Barcelona, Spain

== See also ==
- List of architects
