= Y:Cube =

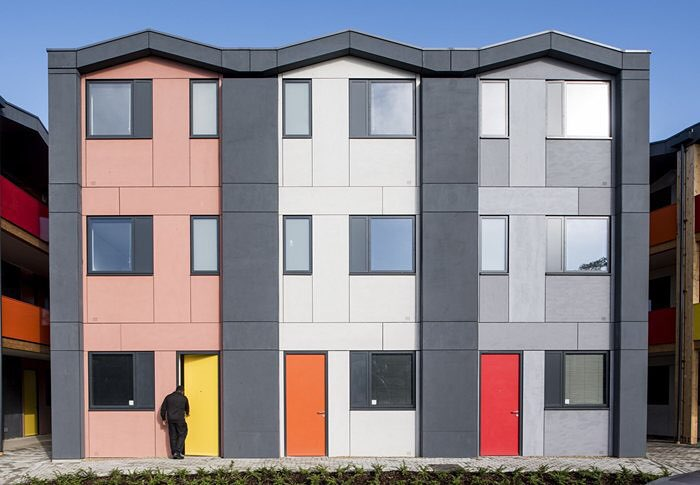

General information
- Status: Completed
- Location: Corner of Clay Avenue and Woodstock Way, Mitcham, London, England
- Coordinates: 51.4089°N 0.1474°W
- Completed: 2015
- Opening: 8 September 2015; 11 years ago
- Cost: GBP £1,600,000
- Owner: YMCA St Paul’s Group

Technical details
- Floor count: 3
- Floor area: 1,640 square metres (18,000 sq ft)

Design and construction
- Architect: Rogers Stirk Harbour + Partners
- Structural engineer: AECOM
- Main contractor: SIG plc

Y:Cube is a three-storey block of 36 one-bedroom affordable housing flats, owned by YMCA St Paul's Group. They include George William Court, 148 Clay Avenue and flats 36A-E Woodstock Way in Mitcham in London, England. George William Court was named after the founder of YMCA, George Williams.

== Construction history ==
Construction of the flats started in March 2015 and were completed in the August of the same year. The flats were built by SIG plc at a construction cost of £1,600,000 and they were designed by Rogers Stirk Harbour + Partners, with Ivan Harbour being the lead architect. The project managers were AECOM. The flats were constructed off-site in Derbyshire before being transported to London.

The block of flats were opened on 8 September 2015 by the then Minister of State for Housing and Planning, Brandon Lewis MP.

== Awards ==
- 2015 AIA UK Awards Shortlist
- 2015 Edison Awards - Silver medal in the ‘Social Solutions’ category
- 2016 World Architecture Festival 2016 - Completed Housing - Shortlist
- 2016 Urban Land Institute J C Nichols Award for Visionaries in Urban Development
- 2016 RIBA Journal MacEwen Award - Shortlist
