= 88 Wood Street =

Office building in the City of London

Coordinates: 51°30′55″N 0°5′42″W

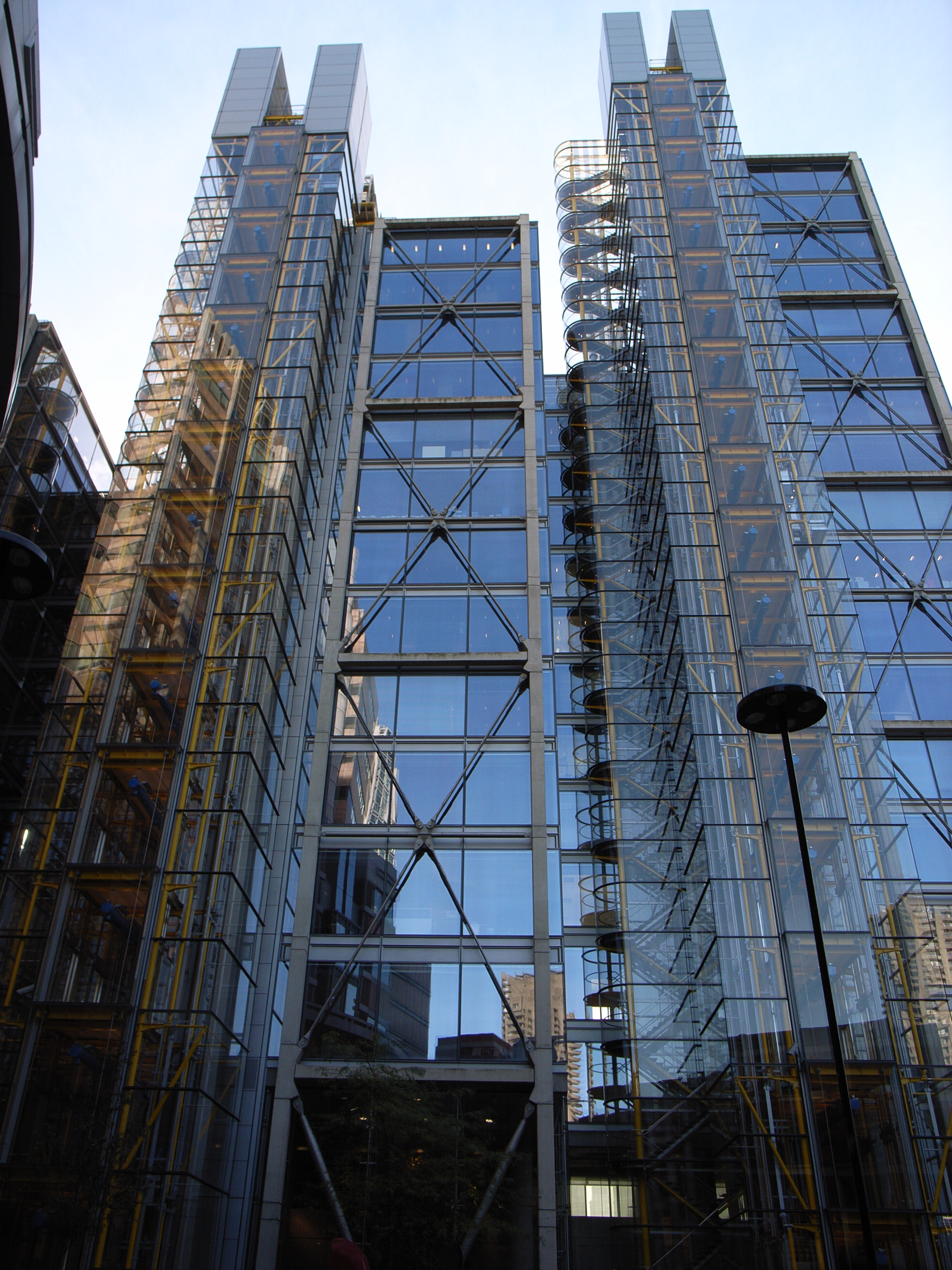

General information
- Status: Completed
- Type: commercial office
- Architectural style: expressionism
- Construction started: 1994
- Completed: 1998; 28 years ago

Technical details
- Floor count: 18
- Lifts/elevators: 12

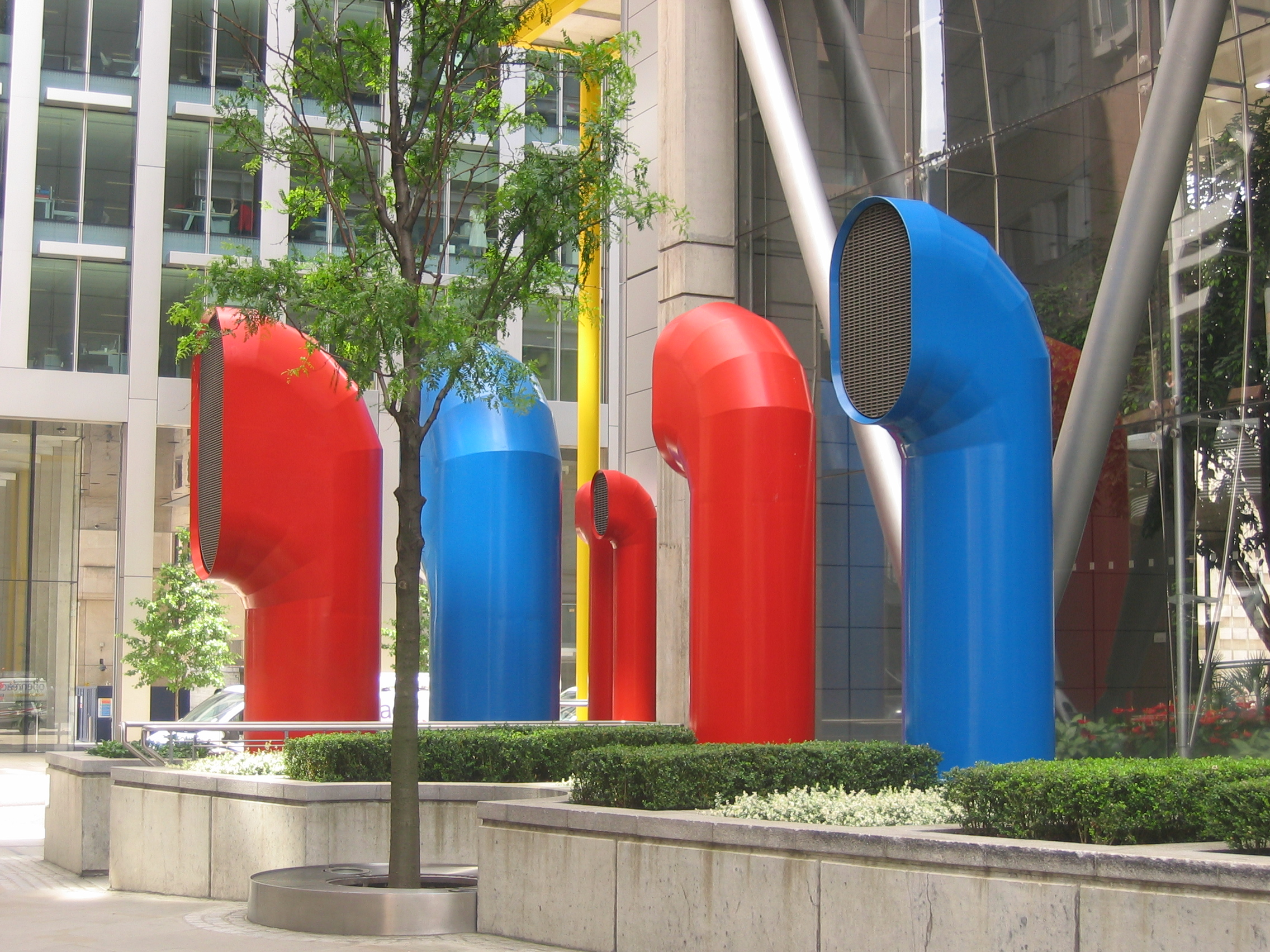
Ventilation funnels at 88 Wood Street.

88 Wood Street is a commercial skyscraper in London, located on Wood Street in the City of London.

The architect was the Richard Rogers Partnership, now known as Rogers Stirk Harbour + Partners, and the director in charge was Graham Stirk. The building was constructed between 1993 and 2001. The 18-storey structure has an office space of 33,000 m^{2} (355,209 sq ft).

== Design ==
The current building address for this building is 88 Wood Street, Barbican, London, EC2V 7QR. It was designed by Richard Rogers Stirk Harbour + Partners.

The building is divided into 3 distinct sections, in decreasing size. The ground floor measures 4,219 SQ FT by 392 SQ M. The first floor measures 14,391 SQ FT by 1,337 SQ M. The next eight floors from floor 2 to 9 measure at 23,853 SQ FT by 2,216 SQ M. The next four floors, from floors 10 to 13 measure 10,089 SQ FT by 937 SQ M.

In 2021, the reception level and five floors of the building were renovated by architects Morrow + Lorraine. These 5 floors were renovated to an open plan model of CAT-A standard.

The design is minimalistic, only using essential structural elements such as lightweight steel frames. The ‘diaphanous’ building is built from diamond white, low iron, triple-glazed glass, allowing the building to take in a lot of natural light. There are bold areas of colour such as the red and blue air funnels and bright yellow stairs.

Its glass lifts are on the outside, creating movement in the building, ‘a theme that has its roots in Richard Rogers' love of early twentieth-century futurist and constructivist experiments’. The building’s highest floors show London from a bird’s eye view where many of its monuments can be seen such as The London Eye and St Paul’s Cathedral.

== Building Structure ==
88 Wood Street is a smart building using Siemens Desigo CC. It is one of the largest Siemens Desigo CC installations in the UK. Rooftop photocells use solar power to adjust the building's blinds, in order to control the light, heat and energy consumption of the building.

The building has three blocks, of varying heights: eight, fourteen and eighteen stories. There are also two basement stories. The building has roof terraces on levels 8, 12, and 16.

ANS Global worked with Morrow + Lorraine and AIS Interiors to convert the building with high-quality materials and design a sophisticated communal space. They created a 45-metre-long wall of live plants, a co-working area and a cafe. They introduced a cycle rack, shower, and locker facilities.
