= Buckingham Street, London =

Street in the City of Westminster, in Central London

Buckingham Street
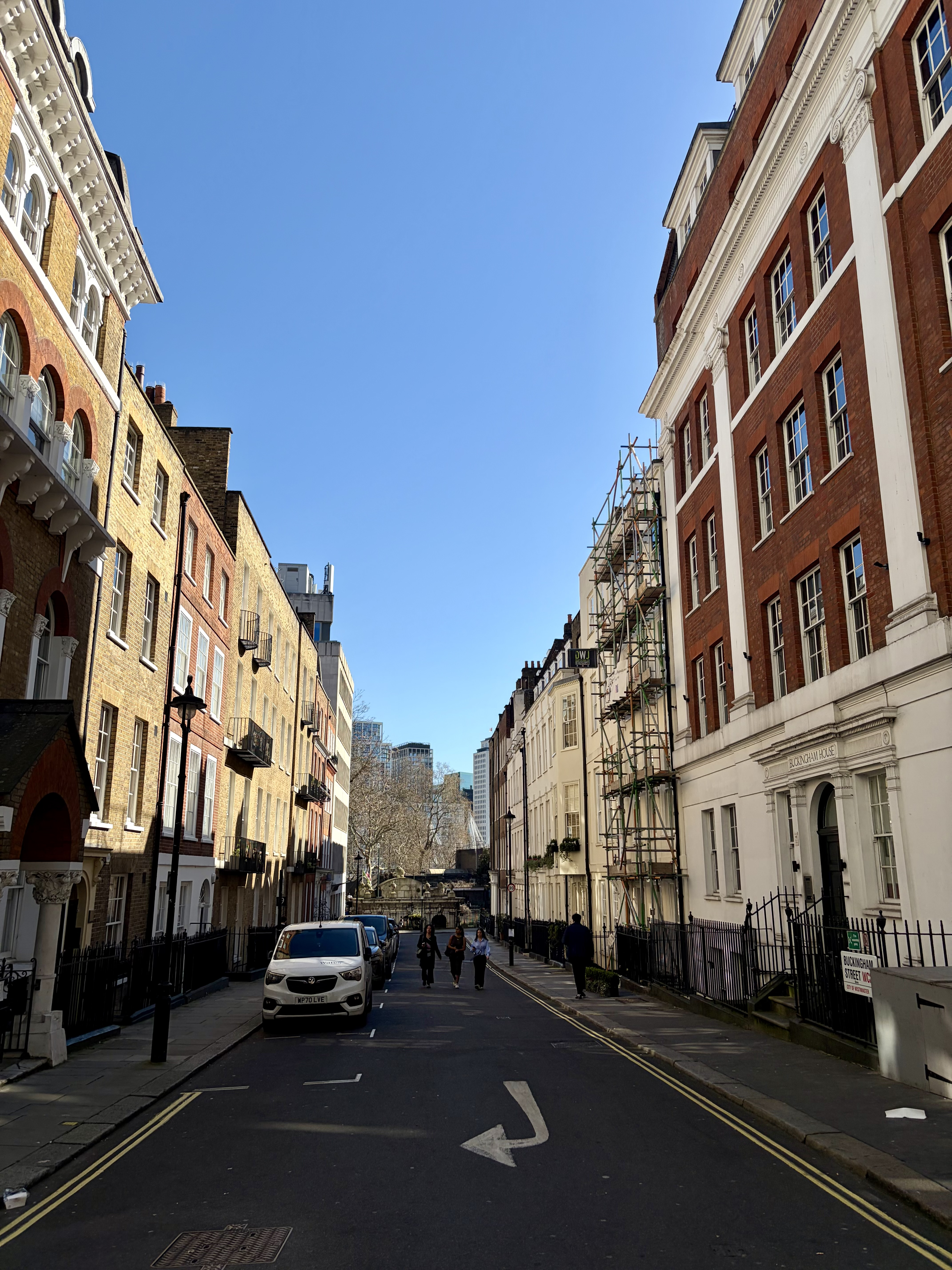
- View down Buckingham Street to the York Watergate
- Interactive map of Buckingham Street
- Length: 0.12 mi (0.19 km)
- Location: Central London, Westminster, London
- Postal code: WC2
- Nearest Tube station: Charing Cross
- Coordinates: 51.5083°N 0.1235°W
- North end: John Adam Street
- South end: Victoria Embankment Gardens

Buckingham Street is a short street in Westminster, London. It was laid out on the site of York House, the London home of George Villiers, 1st Duke of Buckingham. Developed from 1673, the street, and those around it, were all named in Buckingham's honour; George Street, Villiers Street, Duke Street, Of Alley and Buckingham Street itself. Mainly comprising the original late-17th-century houses, Pevsner described the area as "the best such group left in Westminster". Since its construction, Buckingham Street has been home to a number of prominent figures including: Samuel Pepys, the diarist at Nos.12 and 14; the philosophers David Hume and Jean-Jacques Rousseau at No.10; Robert Harley, 1st Earl of Oxford and Earl Mortimer at No.14, and later the artist William Etty and the architect Thomas Graham Jackson; Charles Dickens at No.15, followed by another architect, William Burges, and reputedly prior to both Peter the Great; William Smith, the "Father of English geology" at No.16; and the poet Samuel Taylor Coleridge at No.21.

== Location ==
Buckingham Street runs straight for 0.12 miles from Victoria Embankment Gardens in the south to John Adam Street in the north.

== History and description ==
These narrow houses, three or four storeys high - one for eating, one for sleeping, a third for company, a fourth underground for the kitchen, a fifth perhaps at the top for servants - give the idea of a cage with its sticks and birds

— Louis Simond - Journal of a Tour and Residence in Great Britain (1817)

The original building on the site of what is now Buckingham Street, and its immediate environs, was Norwich Palace, built in the 13th century as the London townhouse of the Bishops of Norwich. It was then briefly held by Charles Brandon, 1st Duke of Suffolk when it was called Suffolk Place, before being granted to the Archbishops of York and being retitled York Palace. Residency at the house was later transferred to Sir Nicholas Bacon, Lord Keeper of the Great Seal in the first decades of the reign of Elizabeth I, although the Archbishops of York retained ownership. The house continued to be used by the Keepers of the Great Seal through the remaining years of Elizabeth, and into the reign of James I, whose Lord Chancellor, Francis Bacon, son of Sir Nicholas, lived at York House until his fall from power in 1621. Ownership was almost immediately gifted to George Villiers, 1st Duke of Buckingham, the much indulged favourite of James. Buckingham, who renamed the house after himself, had great plans for the house, and work commenced with the construction of the York Watergate which provided a ceremonial entrance to the palace from the River Thames. His ambitions ended with his assassination in 1628. Ownership of the site passed to Buckingham's son who, burdened by debt despite reputedly being the richest man in England and in receipt of high rents for the property from successively the ambassadors of Spain, Russia, Denmark, France and Portugal, determined to sell the site for rebuilding. After lengthy and complex negotiations as the property was subject to multiple mortgages, York House was demolished in the early 1670s and a series of streets with housing laid out, the names commemorating the first Duke; George Street, Villiers Street, Duke Street, Of Alley and Buckingham Street itself. (Note: Of Alley, among the shortest streets in London, is now called York Place.)

The housing on Buckingham Street was largely complete by 1680. Designed by a range of builders, and financed by a number of property speculators, notably Nicholas Barbon, they generally follow a standard plan, being built in brick, usually to four storeys with attics and basements, elaborate doorcases and metal railings to the street frontage. Some have later been refaced in stucco. The layout of the buildings followed what Sir John Summerson called "the insistent verticality of the London house" [see box]. Simon Bradley and Nikolaus Pevsner, in the 2003 revised London 6: Westminster in the Buildings of England series, consider the houses on Buckingham and its adjacent streets as, "the best such group left in Westminster".

Buckingham Street is within the Adelphi Conservation Area, one of 56 such areas within the City of Westminster which are accorded special planning protection on account of their historic and/or architectural importance.

== Buildings, occupants and listing designations ==
- No.8 - Grade II* listed.
- No.9 - Grade II* listed. Occupied in the 1680s by Anne, Lady Newburgh. It was later the home of the 18th century actress, Peg Woffington. In the mid-19th century, No.9 was home to the inventor Laurence Holker Potts. In the 1880s, it was used as offices by the Society for the Protection of Ancient Buildings.
- No.10 - Grade II* listed. In 1766, the philosophers David Hume and Jean-Jacques Rousseau had lodgings at No.10. The engineer Thomas Russell Crampton was resident in 1850, followed by another engineer, James Dredge Jr., in the 1870s.
- No.11 - Grade II* listed. Ralph Montagu, 1st Duke of Montagu leased the house in the 1670s, when Master of the Great Wardrobe and the house continued in use by staff of the Wardrobe into the 18th century. In the mid-18th century it was the home of Archibald Stewart, Lord Provost of Edinburgh. In the 19th century, No.11 was home to the artist and angler John Greville Fennell and in the 20th, the illustrator Arthur Rackham.
- No.12 - Grade I listed. Samuel Pepys lived at No.12 for nine years, before moving next door to No.14 in 1688, his increasing wealth enabling the move to the larger house. It was later home to Mary Cromwell, Countess Fauconberg, daughter of Oliver Cromwell. In the mid-19th century, the architect Thomas Allom had his chambers at the house.
- No.13 - Grade II* listed. William Jones, a mathematician and close friend of Sir Isaac Newton and Edmund Halley, lived at No.13 in the 1730s.
- No.14 - Grade II* listed. Pepys moved to No.14 in March 1688. In 1690, under pressure to quit the building having been dismissed from his post, he wrote, "having accommodated it in every Circumstance to my particular Occasions and Method of Living (not easily to be had againe elsewhere) I have this further disswasive from quitting it". His arguments prevailed and No.14 remained his home until two years before his death in 1703. He was succeeded at the house by Robert Harley, Earl of Oxford. Harley remained until his own fall from power in 1714, when he was replaced at No.14 by Arthur Herbert, 1st Earl of Torrington. In the early 19th century, the house was home to the landscape artist Charles Calvert, while the basement was rented as a laboratory by Sir Humphry Davy. In 1826 another artist, William Etty rented the upper floor of the house. The architect John Johnson occupied the house and died there in 1878. From 1892-1916, the house was home to Thomas Graham Jackson, architect of many buildings, and reconstructions at the University of Oxford.
- Railings at the Victoria Embankment Gardens end of the street - Grade II listed.
- York Watergate - Grade I listed, the only remaining element of the 17th century palace
- No.s 15-16 - Demolished in 1906 and replaced in 1964 by Burdett House. No. 15 was briefly the home of Charles Dickens in 1832, who referenced the house as the lodgings of the eponymous hero in his novel, David Copperfield. It was later the home and studio of William Burges, prior to his move to The Tower House. The house has also long been described as the reputed lodgings of Peter the Great on his visit to England in 1698. No.16 was the home of the early geologist, William Smith, who is commemorated by a plaque.
- No.17 - Grade II* listed.
- No.18 - Grade II* listed.
- No.19 - Grade II* listed. James Douglas, 2nd Duke of Queensberry lived at No.19 in the 1690s.
- No.20 - Grade II* listed. The botanist Henry Trimen was resident in the 1870s.
- No.21 - Grade II* listed. Samuel Taylor Coleridge lodged briefly at No.21 in 1799.
- No.22 - Grade II listed. No.22 was designed by Richard Popplewell Pullan, William Burges' brother-in-law, who also ran his architectural practice from the house.

== Gallery ==
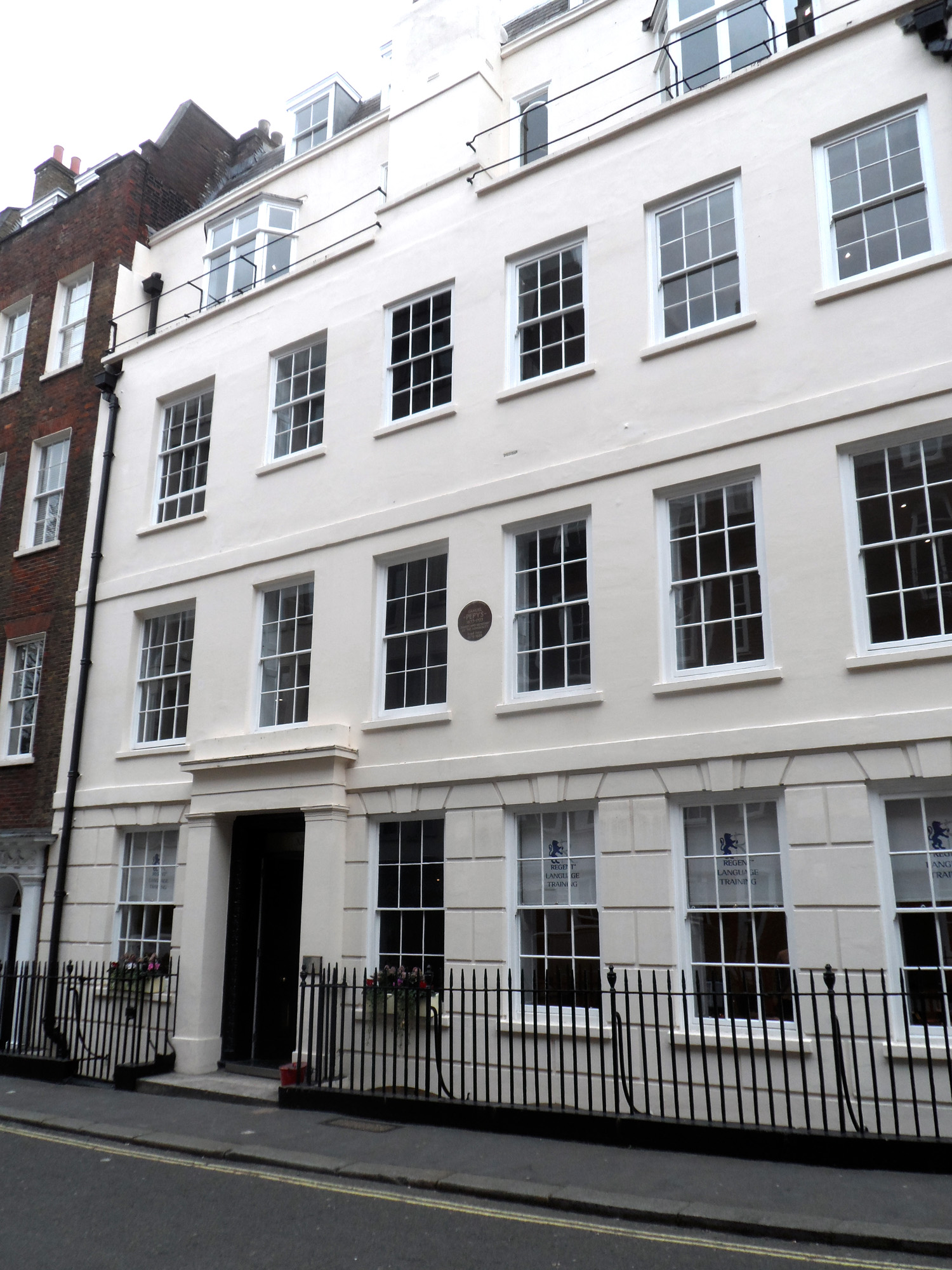
No. 12 - the first of two homes Samuel Pepys had on the street

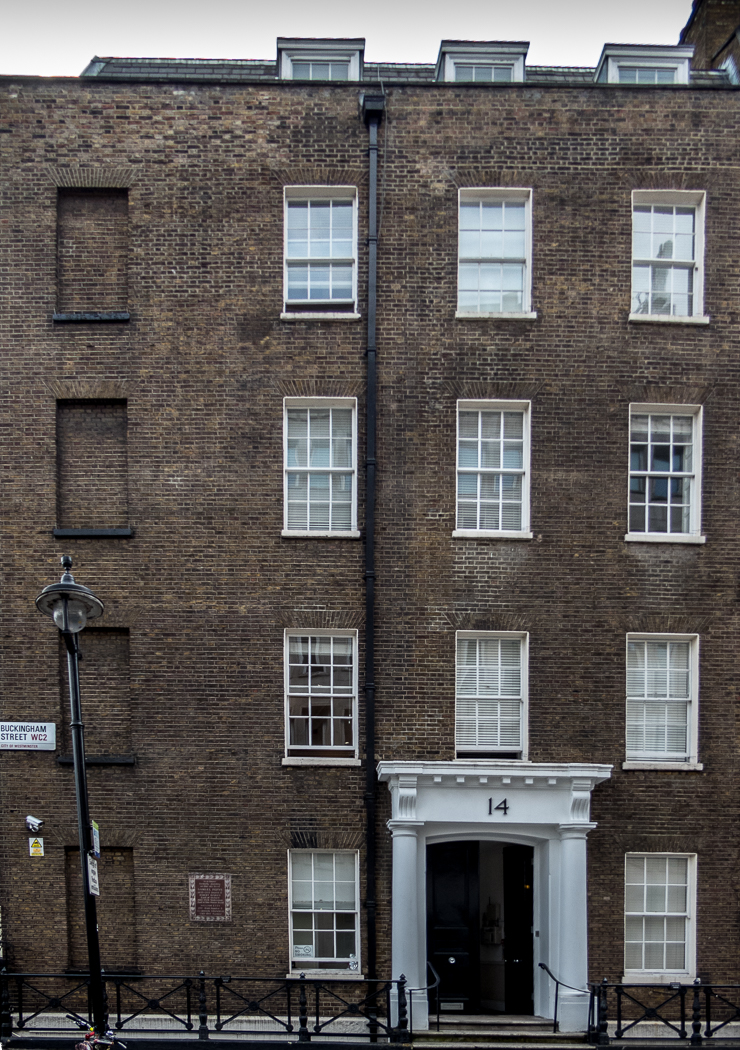
No. 14 - Pepys' second home, and later that of Robert Harley, 1st Earl of Oxford and Earl Mortimer and William Etty

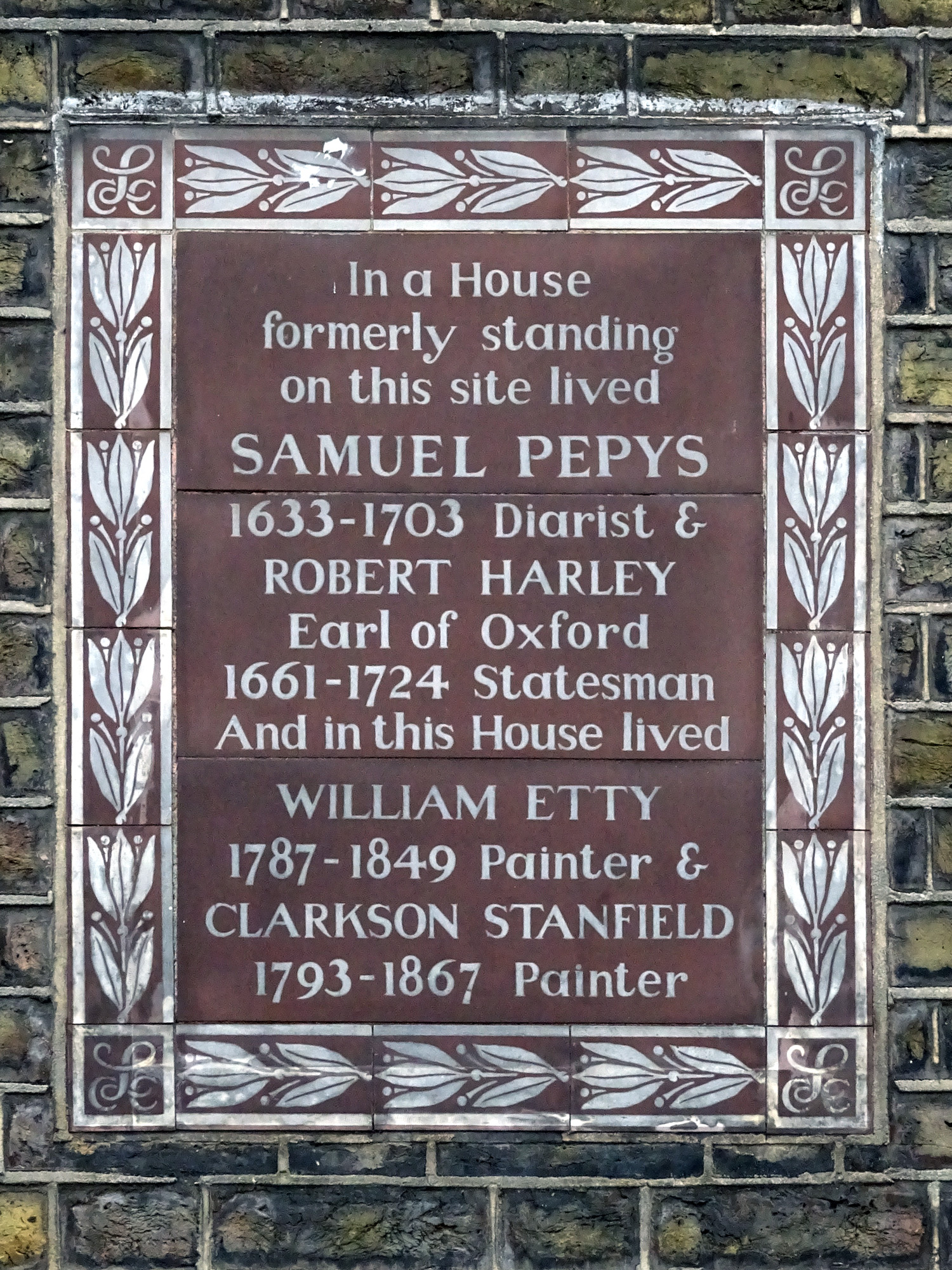
Plaque at No. 14

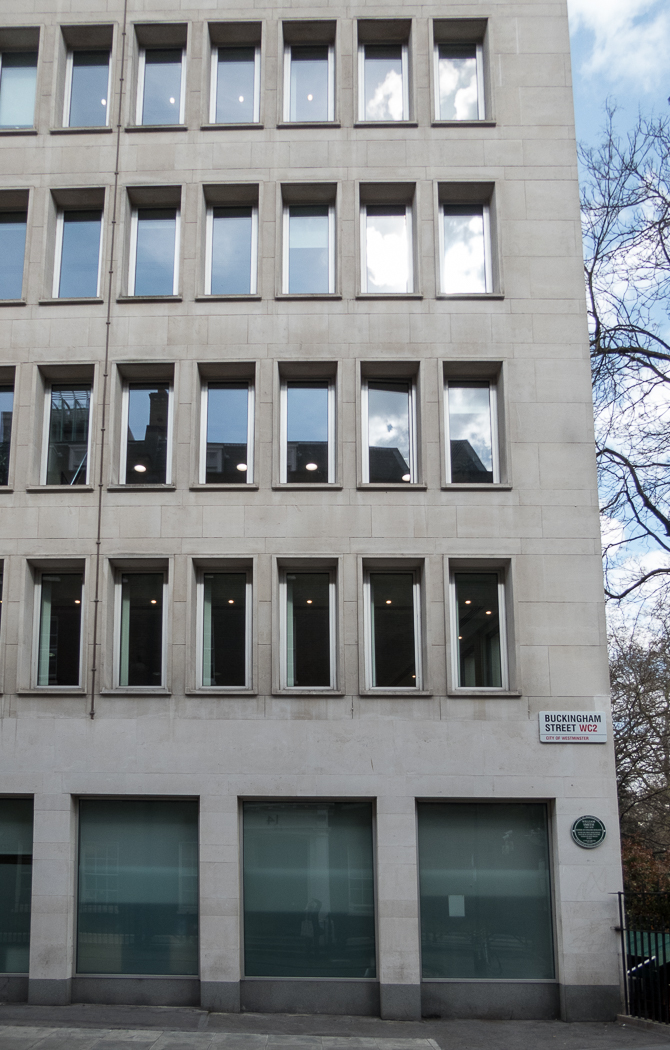
Burdett House, No.s 15-16, built on the site of the homes of Charles Dickens, William Burges and William Smith, and reputedly the lodgings of Peter the Great

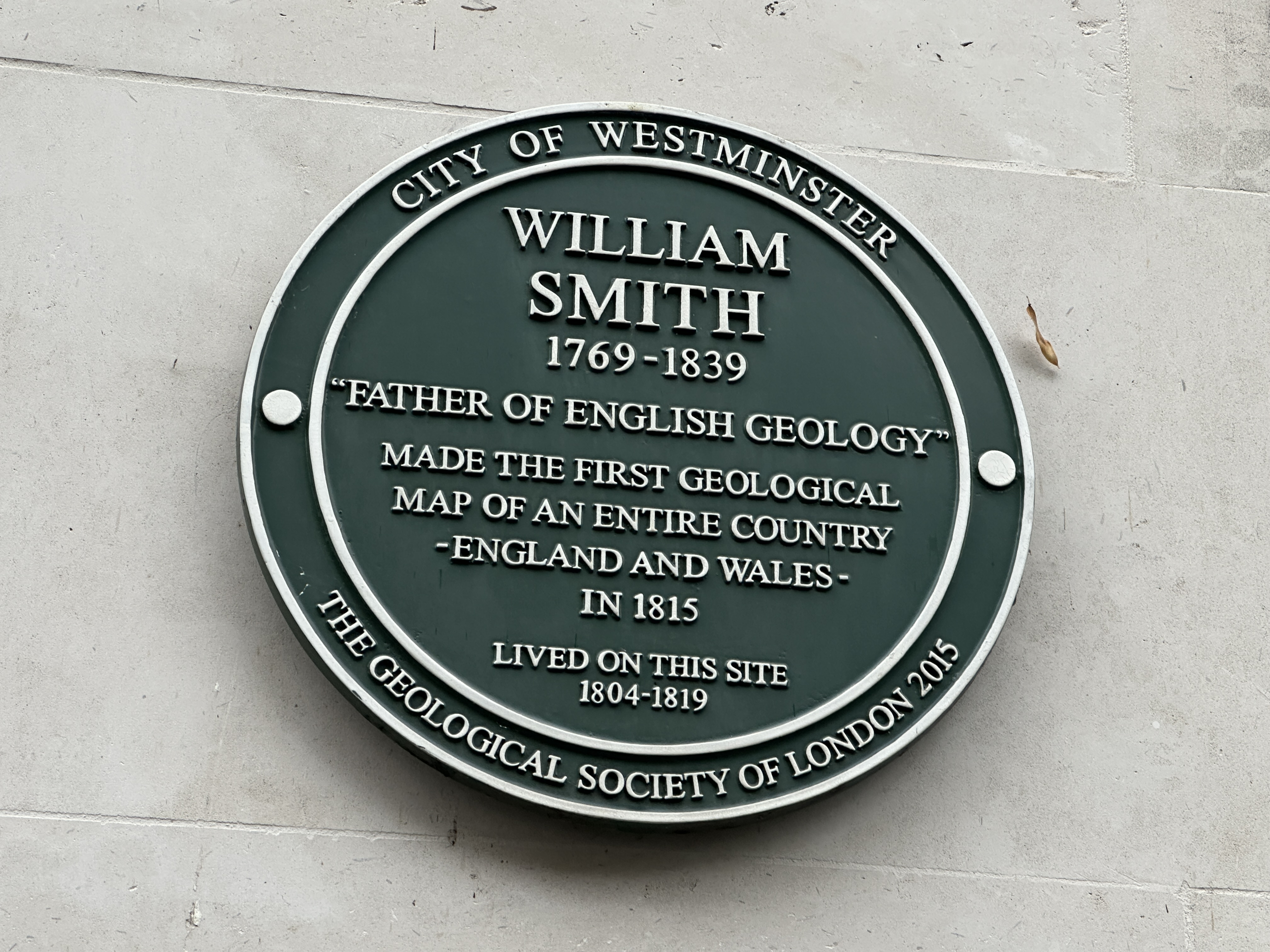
Plaque to William Smith at No. 16

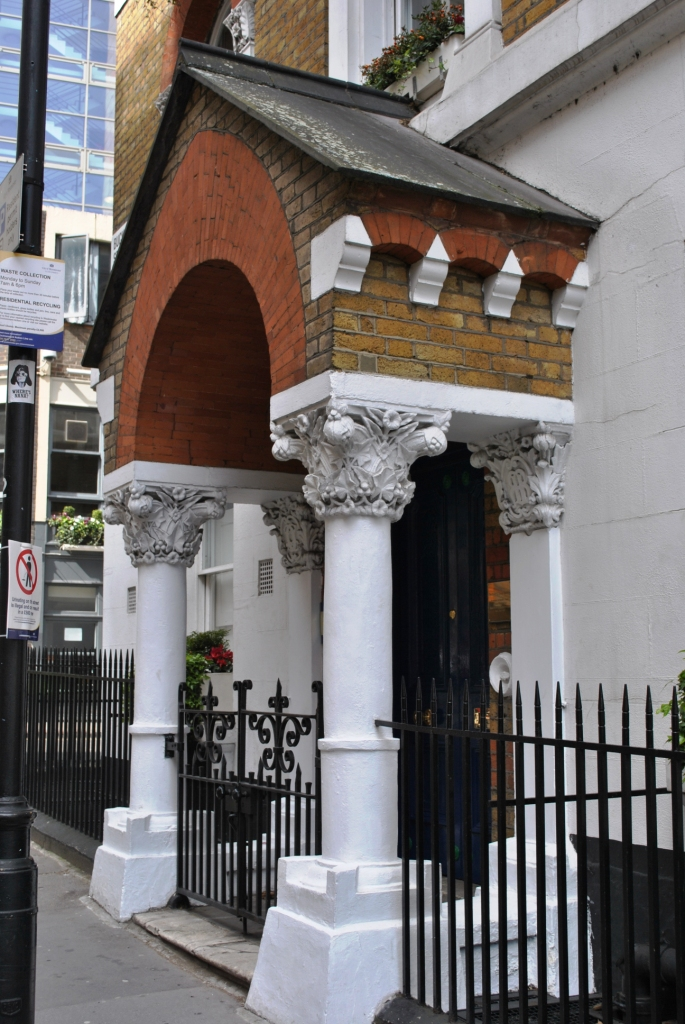
Doorcase of No. 22 by Richard Popplewell Pullan

== Sources ==
- Bradley, Simon; Pevsner, Nikolaus (2003). London: Westminster. The Buildings of England. New Haven, US, London, UK: Yale University Press. ISBN 9780300095951. OCLC 609428632.
- Gater, G. H.; Wheeler, E. P. (1937). St Martin-in-The-Field II: The Strand. Survey of London. London: British History Online.
- Hardwick, Michael; Hardwick, Mollie (1973). The Charles Dickens Encyclopedia. Ware, UK: Wordsworth. ISBN 1853269727.
- Summerson, John (1978). Georgian London. London: Barrie & Jenkins. OCLC 922574924.
- Westminster City Council, ed. (2003). Adelphi Conservation Area Audit (PDF). London: Westminster City Council.
