= Ibbitson =

Ibbitson is a surname. The origins of the name Ibbitson are with the Anglo-Saxon tribes of Britain. Notable people with the surname include:

- John Ibbitson (born 1955), Canadian journalist
- Robert Ibbitson (fl. 1648–1654), English publisher

== See also ==
- Ibbetson
