= York House, Strand =

Former mansion on the Strand in London, England

Coordinates: 51°30′29″N 0°07′24″W

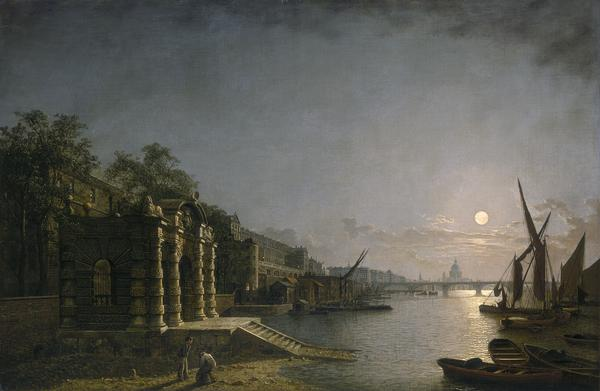
York Water Gate and the Adelphi from the River by Moonlight, by Henry Pether, circa 1850

York House (formerly Norwich Palace or Norwich Place) was one of a series of grand mansions that formerly stood on the Strand, the principal route from the City of London to the Palace of Westminster.

== Norwich Palace ==
The residence was originally known as Norwich Palace when it was built as the London bishop's palace of the Bishops of Norwich not later than 1237. On 4 February 1536 it was given by King Henry VIII to his favourite, Charles Brandon, 1st Duke of Suffolk, in exchange for Suffolk House in Southwark, the Bishop of Norwich having been provided with a new residence at Cannon Row in Westminster.

== York House ==
The residence was subsequently known as York House after it was granted to the Archbishop of York in 1556, and it retained that name for the rest of its existence. Its neighbour to the west was Suffolk House (later Northumberland House), the London townhouse of the Earls of Suffolk (a branch of the Howard family headed by the Dukes of Norfolk), which was sold in the 1640s to Algernon Percy, 10th Earl of Northumberland. Its neighbour to the east was Durham House, the London residence of the Bishop of Durham.

The Bishop of York was by tradition Lord Keeper of the Great Seal of England and for about seventy years from 1558 the house was leased to various secular holders of that high office, including Nicholas Bacon, Thomas Egerton and Francis Bacon.

Francis Bacon resisted requests from the Duke of Lennox and George Villiers, 1st Duke of Buckingham to acquire York House in 1622. Eventually, the Duke of Buckingham prevailed and acquired the house. The Duke began refurbishments before fully holding the title deeds, adding a closet for the Duchess. According to Balthazar Gerbier, an early phase of improvement was merely cosmetic. On 18 November 1623, Buckingham hosted a feast featuring pheasants, partridges and quail at York House, followed by a masque for King James, Prince Charles, and the Spanish ambassador Diego Hurtado de Mendoza (1571–1639). John Maynard's masque celebrated Charles' return from the Spanish Match and offended the diplomats. An engraving of the York House banquet was published by Melchior Tavernier.

King Charles gave Buckingham £1,800 worth of Portland stone in July 1624, and some new interiors were complete by December. His widow, Katherine Villiers, Duchess of Buckingham, continued to live in the house and carry out refurbishments, and made an inventory in 1635.

After an interlude during the English Civil War, York House was returned to George Villiers, 2nd Duke of Buckingham, who sold it to developers for £30,000 in 1672. He made it a condition of the sale that his name and full title should be commemorated by George Street, Villiers Street, Duke Street, Of Alley, and Buckingham Street. Some of these street names are extant, but Of Alley has been renamed York Place, Duke Street is now John Adam Street, and George Street is now York Buildings. Villiers Street runs along the eastern side of Charing Cross railway station.

== Riverside setting ==
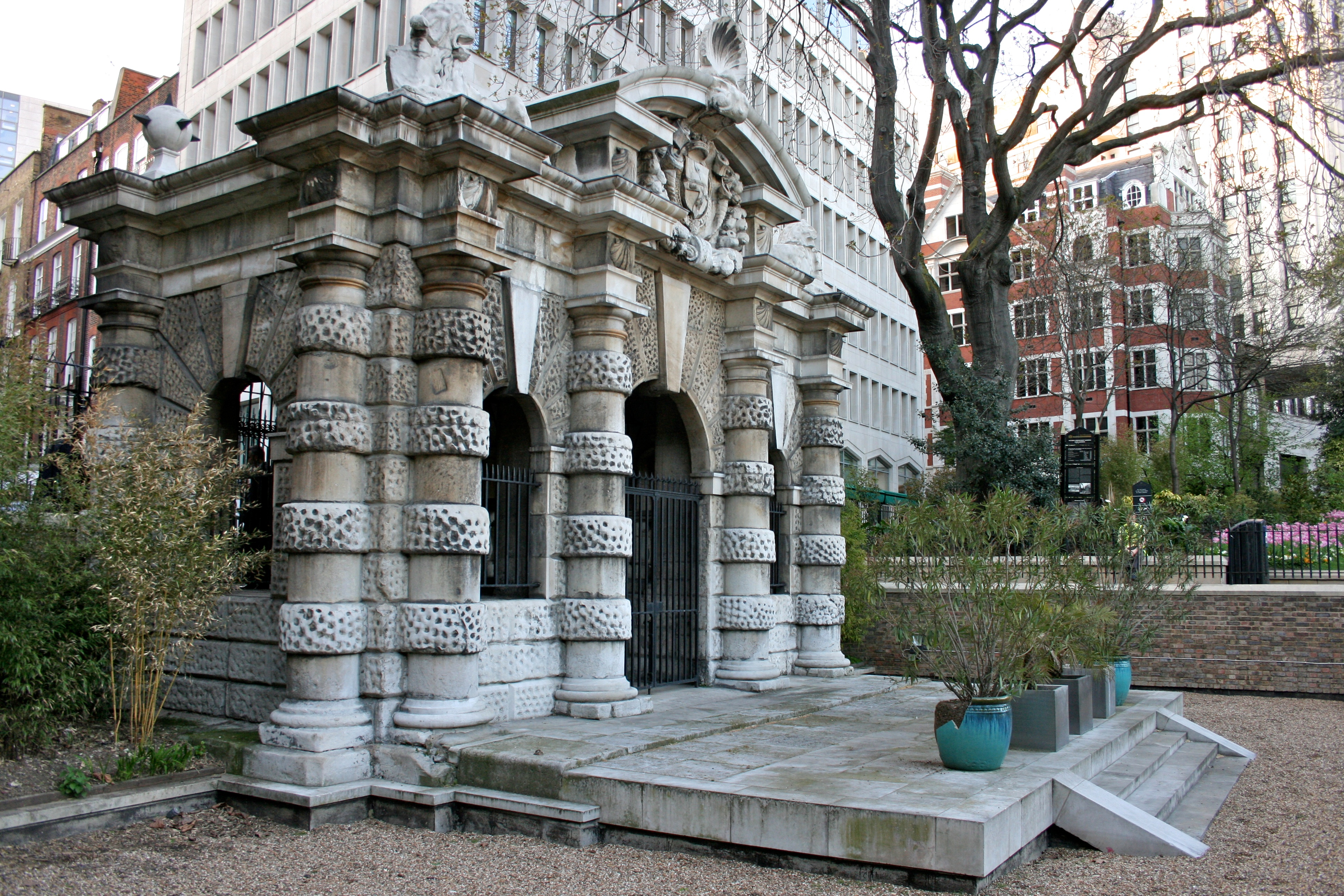
The Italianate York Watergate, built about 1626, displaying the arms of Villiers and decorative escallops featured within them

The mansions facing in the Strand were built there partly because they had direct access from their rear gardens to the River Thames, then a much-used transport artery. The surviving York Watergate (also known as Buckingham Watergate), built by George Villiers, 1st Duke of Buckingham in about 1626 as a ceremonial landing stage on the river, is now marooned 150 yards (137 m) from the river, within the Embankment Gardens, due to substantial riverside land reclamation following the construction of the Thames Embankment. With the Banqueting House it is one of the few surviving reminders in London of the Italianate court style of King Charles I. Its rusticated design in a Serlian manner has been attributed to three plausible candidates, Sir Balthazar Gerbier, to Inigo Jones, and to the sculptor and master-mason Nicholas Stone. The design is modelled closely on that of the Medici Fountain in the Jardin du Luxembourg in Paris. It was restored in the 1950s. George Belton Moore's nineteenth-century picture of it shows it as it would have been when its steps were washed by the waters of the Thames.

== Events ==
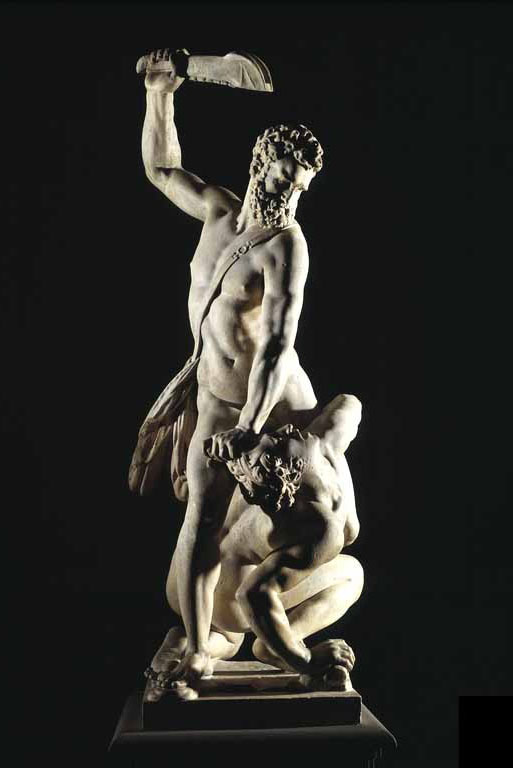
Samson and a Philistine, by Giambologna

The York House Conference which assembled there in February 1626 ended unsatisfactorily with the final rupture between Puritan members of Parliament and Buckingham. York House was the setting for a masque presented before their majesties in May 1627, in which Buckingham appeared followed by "Envy, with divers open-mouthed dogs' heads representing the people's barking, while next came Fame and Truth", just before his departure for his unsuccessful second foray against France.

The first Duke granted lodgings at York House to the painter Orazio Gentileschi, and to Sir Balthazar Gerbier, diplomat and sometime painter. Although the Duchess tried to expel the latter after the Duke's assassination in 1628, it was in Gerbier's lodgings that Peter Paul Rubens sojourned during his visit to London the following year.

== Inventory of 1635 ==
Two inventories of the contents of York House were drawn up by 1635, and are a valuable source for the insight into one of the handful of great art collections of the period. There were 330 paintings enumerated, many of which were sold at Antwerp in 1649 for the young Duke; among them were seventeen canvases by Rubens. There were tapestries, marble sculptures, plate and rich furnishings. These represent the taste formed in the circle of Charles I, and the furnishings of a fashionable early Stuart nobleman's residence. Wealthy courtier art collectors have become known as the Whitehall Group. The inventories reflect the house as used by Buckingham's widow, Katherine Villiers, Duchess of Buckingham, and her Red and Green closets furnished with paintings are particularly well-documented.

In the 'Great Chamber' twenty-two paintings were displayed with fifty-nine pieces of Roman sculpture, many of which were heads. In the 'Gallery' were a further thirty-one heads and statues. Apparently the only modern sculpture at York House was Giambologna's Samson and a Philistine, a royal gift from King Philip IV of Spain to Charles I, who passed it to his favourite, Buckingham.

The inventory includes the mount in the garden where there was a marble statue of Cain and Abel and a vaulted room beneath decorated with plaster heads of Roman emperors and a marble table.

== Legacy ==
In the early 19th century the designation York House was revived by the palatial York House, built in the Stable Yard, St. James's Palace, for Frederick, Duke of York, brother of George IV and heir apparent. Foundations were begun to designs by Robert Smirke, who was quickly replaced by Benjamin Dean Wyatt and his brother Philip; when the Duke died in 1827, deeply in debt with the house unfinished, it was subsequently completed as Stafford House; its gilded interiors by Sir Charles Barry for George Sutherland-Leveson-Gower, 2nd Duke of Sutherland, inspired Queen Victoria's famous remark about "coming from my house to your palace".

The name is carried today by a commercial building in Portugal Street, Kingsway, London.

The York Watergate is at the centre of the song "London Plane" by progressive rock band Big Big Train on their 2016 album Folklore. The song is written from the perspective of a nearby London plane tree that was a sapling at the time of the construction of the Watergate in 1626 and tells of the stories that such a tree may have witnessed in the years since.

== See also ==
- Adelphi, London (a later development on the same site)
- York House (for a list of other mansions in London which have been known as York House)

== Sources ==
- London's Mansions by David Pearce, (1986) ISBN 0-7134-8702-X
- Survey of London, xviii, plates 31–33.
- Howard Colvin, A Biographical Dictionary of British Architects, 1600-1840 3rd ed. 1995 sv "Sir Balthazar Gerbier", "Inigo Jones" "Nicholas Stone"
