= George Belton Moore =

George Belton Moore (1806–1875) was an English artist who specialised in landscape, architectural and topographical composition, and often exhibited his work at the Royal Academy and British Institution. He was an influential drawing-master and the author of books on the principles of colour and perspective.

== Birth and early career ==
He was born in London on 24 March 1806, probably at his parents’ house on the corner of Rathbone Place and Oxford Street. His father, William Moore, was a funeral undertaker whose more noteworthy engagements included the clandestine burial of Joanna Southcott.

He became a student at the Royal Academy and was reputedly also a pupil of Augustus Charles Pugin, under whose general direction he drew the interiors of Drury Lane Theatre and Westminster Hall, the western front of the Abbaye aux Hommes, Caen, and the nave of Saint-Ouen Abbey, Rouen, 1826–7. The influence of Pugin may be evident in Moore’s first exhibit at the Royal Academy in 1830 - a view of London’s Fish Street Hill, looking towards London Bridge, with detailed attention to the Monument and the spire of St Magnus the Martyr.

He had spent time in Italy by 1833, and in the following year the architectural sketches he made there attracted favourable attention when displayed, together with his interior view of Peterborough Cathedral, at the London Architectural Society’s first conversazione of the season at Exeter Hall. Little more than a month afterwards, however, his exhibition piece at the British Institution, depicting Venetians landing spoils of victory in front of the Doge’s Palace, was deplored by the Morning Post’s critic for the unrealistically “raw” colour of its sky.

Described as an “architectural painter”, he was admitted a member of the Artists’ Benevolent Fund in 1832, when one of his sponsors was Henry Sass, and his standing in artistic circles by 1835 is suggested by his signature to the widely published “Protest of Architects and Artists” objecting to the demolition of the fire-damaged St Stephen's Chapel (the other signatories being the already eminent William Etty, Henry Perronet Briggs, Daniel Maclise, Solomon Hart, Clarkson Stanfield, James Savage, Lewis Cottingham, Edward I'Anson, Richard Evans, George Smith, and the brothers George and Joseph Gwilt). Watercolours of what then remained of the chapel were painted by one “G. Moore” and these have, in recent times, been presented as the work of George Belton Moore; however, such attribution may be an example of what seems to be widespread crediting to him of work supposed but not known to be his (for which see further below).

== Exhibition and reception of his work ==
Between 1830 and 1870 thirty-two of his works were exhibited at the Royal Academy, thirty-one at the British Institution, twenty-nine at the Society of British Artists’ gallery in Suffolk Street, and forty-nine at other London exhibition venues. He also exhibited in Glasgow and Dublin. Most frequently his exhibits at the Royal Academy and British Institution were urban landscapes or architectural studies, usually painted in Rome, Venice, Verona or Pavia. His work in England consisted mainly of images of ecclesiastical or fortified buildings, but occasionally he produced large landscapes such as Derwentwater and Bassenthwaite Lakes from Ashness, Cumberland (1839).

His architectural studies were sometimes presented in a scene from history or literature, but his figurework in such compositions tended to be dismissed as “stiff” and lacking in vigour. When exhibited, his work generally received measured commendation rather than energetic admiration – “pleasing”, “faithful”, “careful” and “imposing” being adjectives frequently employed in their appraisal. Those of his paintings which excited one critic were often dismissed by another.

He worked principally in watercolour heightened with bodycolour or gouache, and sometimes made preparatory sketches in coloured crayon. He discovered and advertised a method of setting or fixing crayon drawings so as to preserve them from damage when carried in portfolio. When, in 1845, he exhibited a work executed in oil, one reviewer observed “if it is his first attempt in oils it is to be hoped it will deter him from making a second”.

== Skill as draughtsman ==
His talent principally resided in his skill as a draughtsman. He was the Head Drawing Master at University College London, and also taught at the Royal Military Academy, Woolwich. In 1840 the subjects of his daily lectures at the former were advertised as “Geometrical and Isometrical Projection including the Delineation of Shadows applicable to Architecture, Engineering and Machinery, Perspective, Landscape and Figures, illustrated by Outline or Form, Light, Shade and Colour”. In his final years he taught at Islington’s Barnsbury Park Collegiate School for Gentlemen (which claimed Barnsbury Park to be “the most salubrious suburb of London”).

His obituary notice in The Athenaeum magazine recorded that his acknowledged skill in plotting perspective had rewarded him with “a share in the production of more than one well-known picture,” adding “We believe it was he who drew out the perspective of Mr [William Powell] Frith’s Railway Station, the remarkable element of that popular work”. The latter statement, echoed in Samuel Redgrave’s biographical notice of Moore, receives no support from Frith’s own account of the picture’s production but derives some credibility from the circumstance that The Athenaeum’s arts critic at the relevant time was the well-informed Frederic George Stephens.

== Publications ==
In 1850 Moore’s treatise Perspective, its Principles and Practice was published in two volumes, and in the following year appeared his The Principles of Colour applied to Decorative Arts. In 1856, encouraged by the establishment of the Metropolitan Board of Works and anxious to contribute to the progressive improvement of the capital, he published a pamphlet, London Promenades, or Suggestions for Preserving and Improving the Suburban Roads, in which he proposed “the planting of trees to import some of the attractions of Paris boulevardes”.

== Family, residence and gallery sponsorship ==
He was still based at 1 Rathbone Place, his childhood home, in 1830. He was at 74 Margaret Street, Cavendish Square, by 1837, and residing at 19 Southampton Place, Holborn, in 1843. Following his marriage, at Brighton in 1848, to Mrs Ann Stephenson (née Lind) the couple lived at Park Cottage, Park Village East, and by 1852 at 20 Holford Square, Pentonville. They were at Lansdowne Terrace, Bloomsbury, in 1860, and at 221 Burrage Road, Plumstead, when Moore died there on 4 November 1875, aged 69. His widow died at Winslade Road, Brixton Rise, in 1878.

He was a proprietary member of the National Institution of Fine Arts when it operated the Portland Gallery at 316 Regent Street.

== Legacy ==
Moore’s work provides a useful record of urban landscapes, particularly in London, as they existed nearly two hundred years ago. His painting of Old London Bridge and New London Bridge from Southwark has been considered “of much value as a topographical record showing that old London Bridge was still being used for traffic as late as the year 1830 and also gives their relative positions and the nature of the projecting starlings which had been added to break the rush of water on the piers”, while his York Watergate records that structure (now stranded in Embankment Gardens) when its steps were washed by the waters of the Thames.

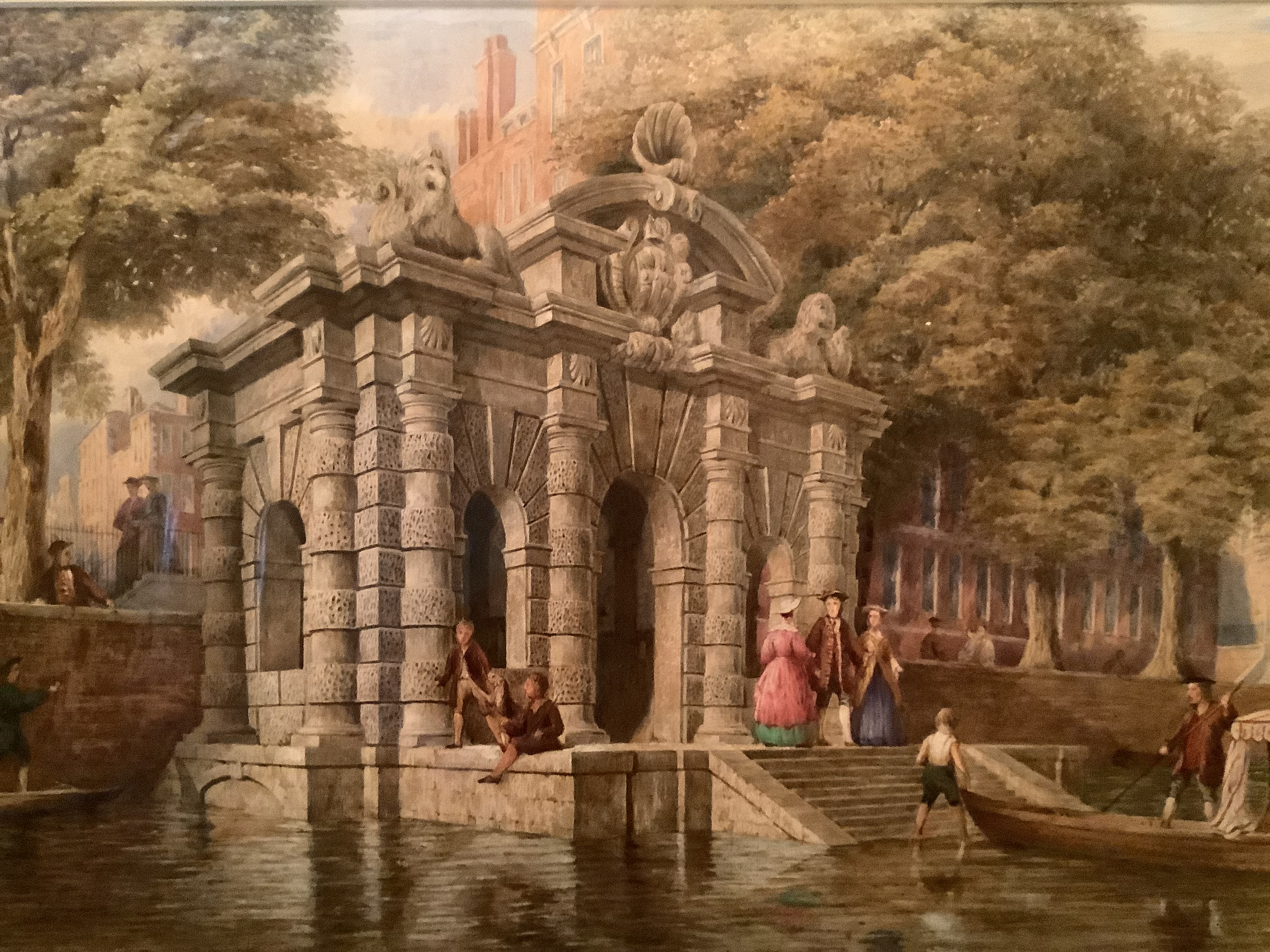
George Belton Moore's depiction of York Watergate, London.

== Work variously attributed to him ==
His exhibited paintings were invariably signed “G. B. Moore”, and the architectural drawings he made under Pugin’s direction were credited thus in print. However, there has been attributed to him a substantial body of work identifying its creator(s) as “George Moore” or “G. Moore”.

This includes the lithographic work of one George Moore who in the 1840s elaborated and engraved on stone some forty sketches that Owen Jones and Jules Goury had made in Egypt a decade earlier; the lithographs were published in 1843 when said to evidence “the rapid progress of this beautiful branch of engraving”. The same artist may have been responsible for what Henry Gally Knight called “the architectural drawings of my companion Mr George Moore”, made when the pair travelled together in Sicily; thirty of these drawings illustrated Knight’s Saracenic and Norman Remains and were credited as the work of G. Moore lithographed by W. Walton. Knight’s Ecclesiastical Architecture of Italy also included drawings and lithographs by G. Moore, printed by the firm of Day & Haghe, with which that artist seems to have been closely associated. His drawings and engravings on zinc form the end-plates to Alexis de Chateauneuf’s The Country House, and there are numerous examples of his work, as printed by Day & Haghe, being attributed to George Belton Moore.

The authority on provenance, Algernon Graves, distinguished George Belton Moore from London-based artists named “G. Moore” whose work was displayed at the Royal Academy between 1797 and 1840. Caution is evidently appropriate before accepting George Belton Moore as responsible for work that was not, during his lifetime, expressly recorded as by G. B. Moore.
