= Balthazar Gerbier =

Anglo-Dutch courtier, diplomat

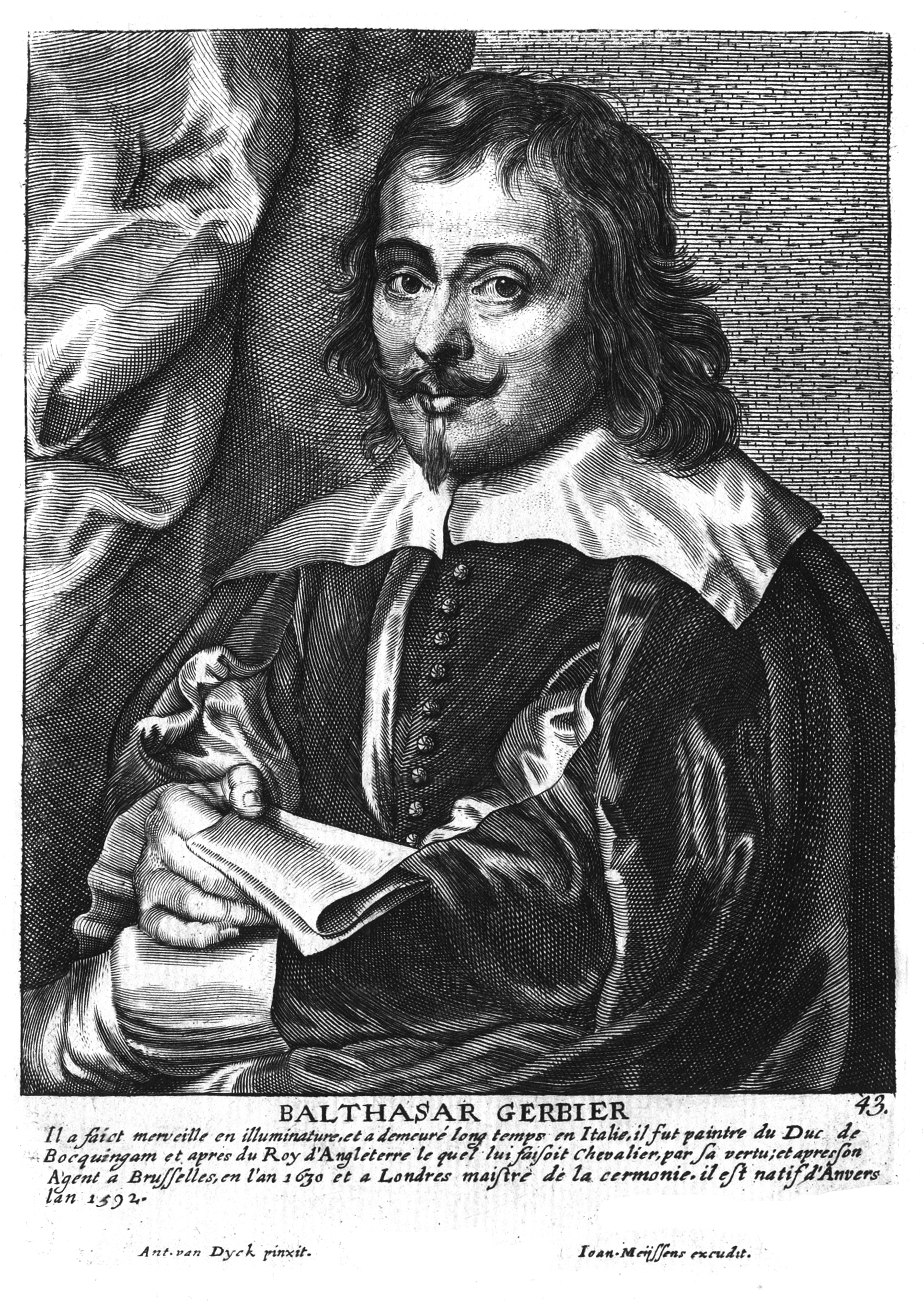
Balthasar Gerbier in Het Gulden Cabinet, p 249

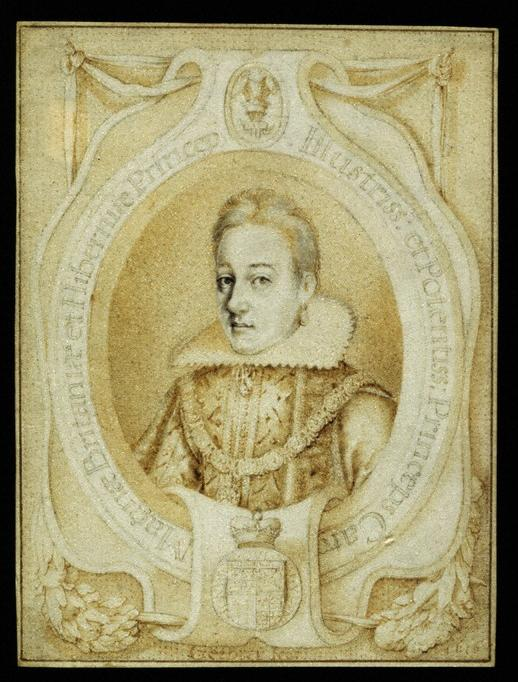
Charles, Prince of Wales, 1616, Sir Balthazar Gerbier V&A Museum no. 621-1882

Sir Balthazar Gerbier (23 February 1592, in N.S. – 1663) was an Anglo-Dutch courtier, diplomat, art advisor, miniaturist and architectural designer, in his own words fluent in "several languages" with "a good hand in writing, skill in sciences as mathematics, architecture, drawing, painting, contriving of scenes, masques, shows and entertainments for great Princes... as likewise for making of engines useful in war."

== Biography ==
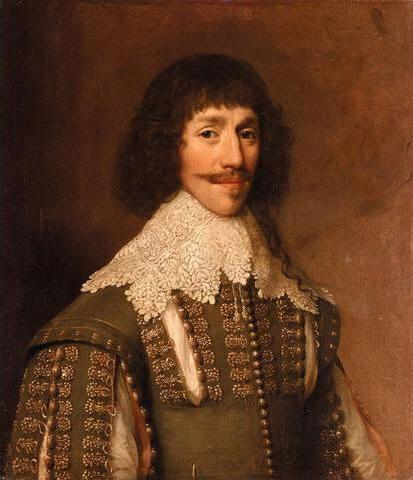
Portrait of a gentleman, by Gerbier

Gerbier, the son of Anthony Gerbier, was born in Middelburg, Zeeland, of a Huguenot family that had settled there. Dutch sources show that his family were cloth merchants although he claimed that his grandfather had been a "Baron Douvilly" and so signed himself on occasion.

As a designer of siege machinery he was recommended by Maurice of Nassau, later Prince of Orange, through whose efforts Gerbier arrived in London in 1616, in the train of the Dutch ambassador. In London he soon found a patron in George Villiers, 1st Duke of Buckingham for whom he found paintings and negotiated their purchase, acting in a sense as keeper of the Duke's collection, and for whom he painted miniatures and oversaw remodelling about 1625, at York House in the Strand and at New Hall, Essex (both since demolished). At York House and at New Hall, Gerbier was busy with architectural alterations for Buckingham, 1624-25. and ordered a wooden model of New Hall to be made for the Duke. At York House, a visit from Inigo Jones while the paving was being laid in the grande chambre reveals Gerbier's intense competitiveness with the Surveyor of the King's Works, whose apparent jealousy of what he saw at York House gave Gerbier undisguised delight.

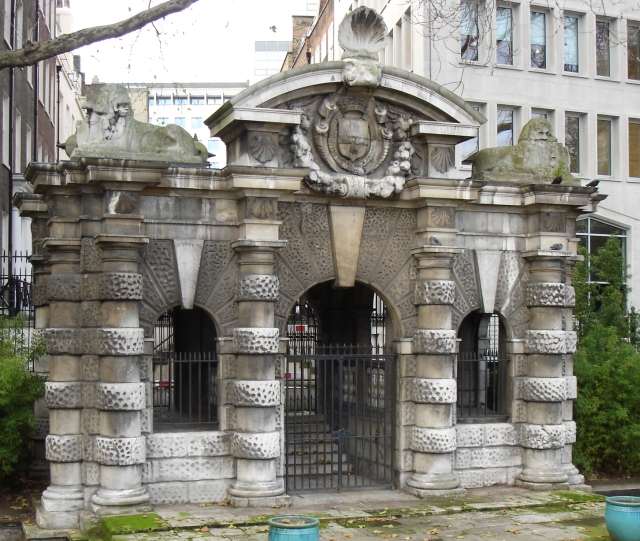
The Italianate York Water Gate survives in Embankment Gardens

With Buckingham and Prince Charles (the future Charles I), Gerbier was a member of the ill-fated diplomatic party that travelled to Madrid in connection with the Spanish Match. In Madrid Gerbier painted a portrait of the Infanta that was returned to London for the approval of James I. On a similar mission in Paris in 1625 he met his fellow countryman, diplomatist and courtier, Peter Paul Rubens, with whom he developed a close friendship; when Rubens went to London in 1629, it was with Gerbier that he lodged. Rubens' portrait of Gerbier's family is in the Royal Collection, Windsor. When Rubens died in 1640, Gerbier was in Antwerp and sent an inventory of his collection to Charles. The king inherited Gerbier after Buckingham's assassination (1628) and employed him as resident agent in Brussels, a difficult post (1631–1641) He is regarded as being a member of the "Whitehall Group" a term used by Oliver Millar in a magazine article in 1956 and subsequently in a 1958 book. to describe those associated with Charles I who introduced a taste for Italian old masters to England.

While in Brussels as the English agent, Gerbier conspired with Flemish nobles to overthrow their Spanish governors and then sold the secret of the conspiracy to the King of Spain. King Charles never found out and Gerbier was knighted in 1638 and appointed Master of Ceremonies, in charges of the royal "shows and entertainments" but was disappointed not to receive Inigo Jones's post of Surveyor of the King's Works.

His court appointment put him in contact with the Lord Treasurer, Richard Weston, 1st Earl of Portland, for whom Gerbier advised on the construction of a house and garden at Putney Park, Roehampton, Surrey, which was demolished in the eighteenth century (Colvin). For the same patron he supervised the equestrian statue of Charles the First, now at Charing Cross.

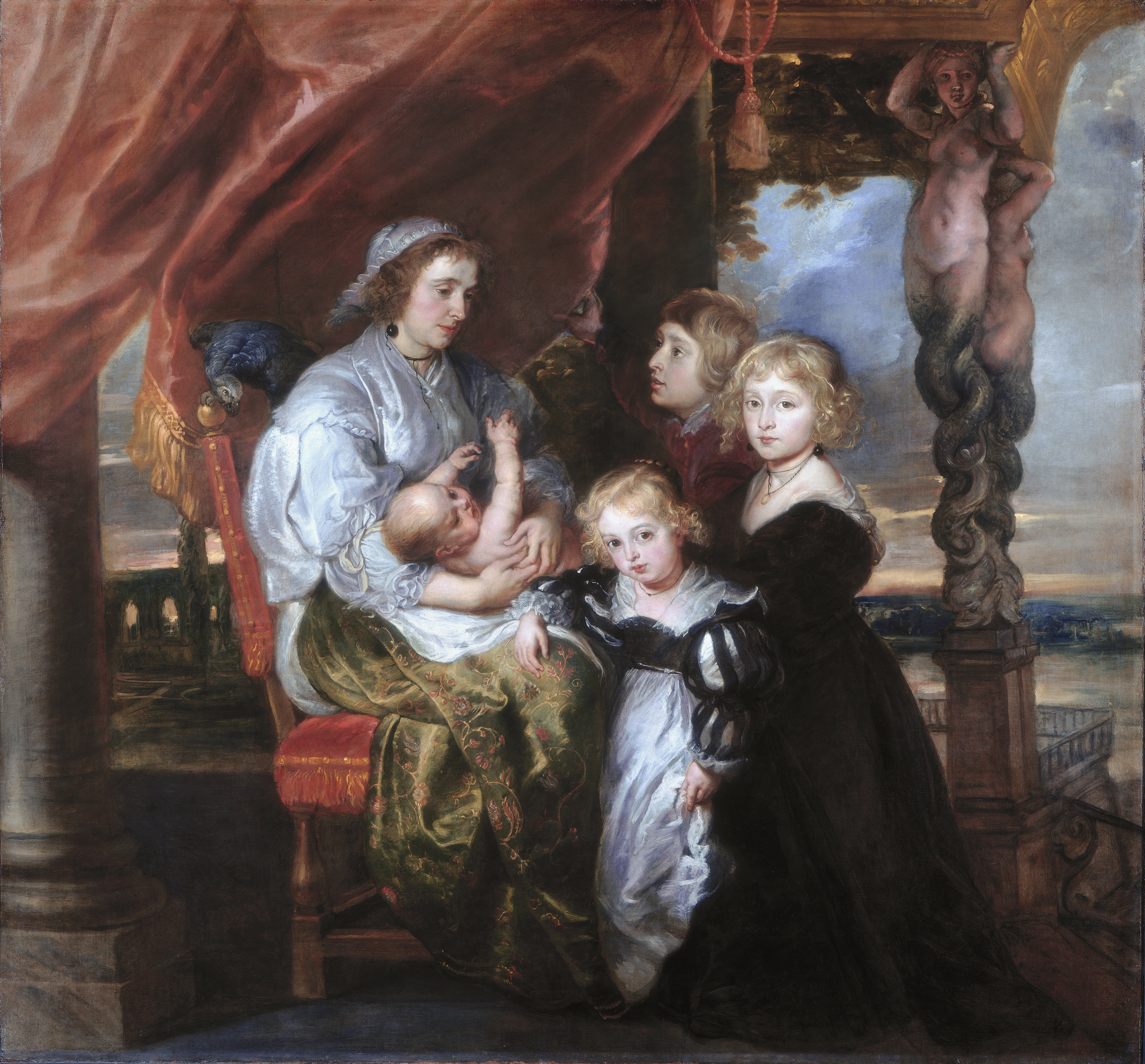
Deborah Kip, wife of Balthasar Gerbier, and her children (Peter Paul Rubens, 1629-1630)

A political feud soon led to Gerbier's replacement in 1641, followed by a couple of decades during the Civil War and the Commonwealth in which he improvised a living, ventured a banking scheme in France, made a gold-hunting venture to Guiana, kept a painting academy in Bethnal Green, and allied himself to Cromwell and his republican government, with a profession of loyalty to the Parliamentarians in 1642-43 and a dedication to Lord Fairfax of a lecture on military architecture (1650), In 1653 he published an account of the evil effects on sovereigns of wicked and pernicious favourites.

In 1660 he published A sommary description manifesting that greater profits are to bee done in the hott then in the could [sic] parts off the coast off America . . . Here he advocated the enslavement of Africans as a means of increasing profits for investors as a) slaves are cheaper to maintain, and b) Africans work twice as hard as Christians. To the point that it is "not Christian-like to use rational creatures in that quality" he argues firstly that Africans brought directly from Africa had already been enslaved by other Africans, and had thus lived under the "Slavery off the Devil". Furthermore, he argues, by being introduced to the society of Christians their lives are improved as they are changed "as from brutes into rationals“.

With the Restoration, his suit for reinstatement as Master of Ceremonies was turned away, and he had to retreat into anonymity when the designs for the temporary triumphal arches for Charles II's coronation were engraved; Colvin notes that J. Ogilvie's Relation of His Majestie's entertainment passing through the City of London to his coronation with a description of the triumphal arches (1661, 2nd ed. 1662) credits the design of the arches to Peter Mills "and another Person, who desir's to have his name concealed", whom Colvin surmises to have been the disgraced Gerbier, who refers to them in his Brief Discourse (1662). Colvin notes similarities with Rubens' designs for the royal entry of the Cardinal Infante Ferdinand into Antwerp, 1635 (published 1642), with which Gerbier would have been familiar.

In the 1660s Gerbier's necessities induced him to advertise himself by publishing some essays on architecture: A brief Discourse concerning the Three Chief Principals of Magnificent Building (1662) and Counsel and Advise to all Builders (1663). He was commissioned to rebuild Hampstead Marshall, Berkshire, for William Craven, 1st Earl of Craven (1608–1697), but died there, with the structure still in the works: the piano nobile had not yet been begun. It was completed by Captain William Winde, but suffered a disastrous fire in 1718 (Colvin).

== Publications ==
- Gerbier, Balthazar (1653), Les effects pernicieux de meschants favoris et grands ministres d'Estat Es provinces Belgiques, en Lorraine, Germanie, France, Italie, Espagne, & Angleterre., The Hague
- Gerbier, Balthazar Sir (1650), The first lecture being an introduction to the military architecture, or fortifications, Printed at London: For Robert Ibbitson ..., OL 15016969M
- Gerbier, Balthazar Sir (1650), The art of wellspeaking (The art of well speaking ed.), London: Printed for Robert Ibbitson, OL 16769793M
