= York Watergate =

Marooned gate that formerly fronted onto the Thames

Coordinates: 51.5081°N 0.1229°W

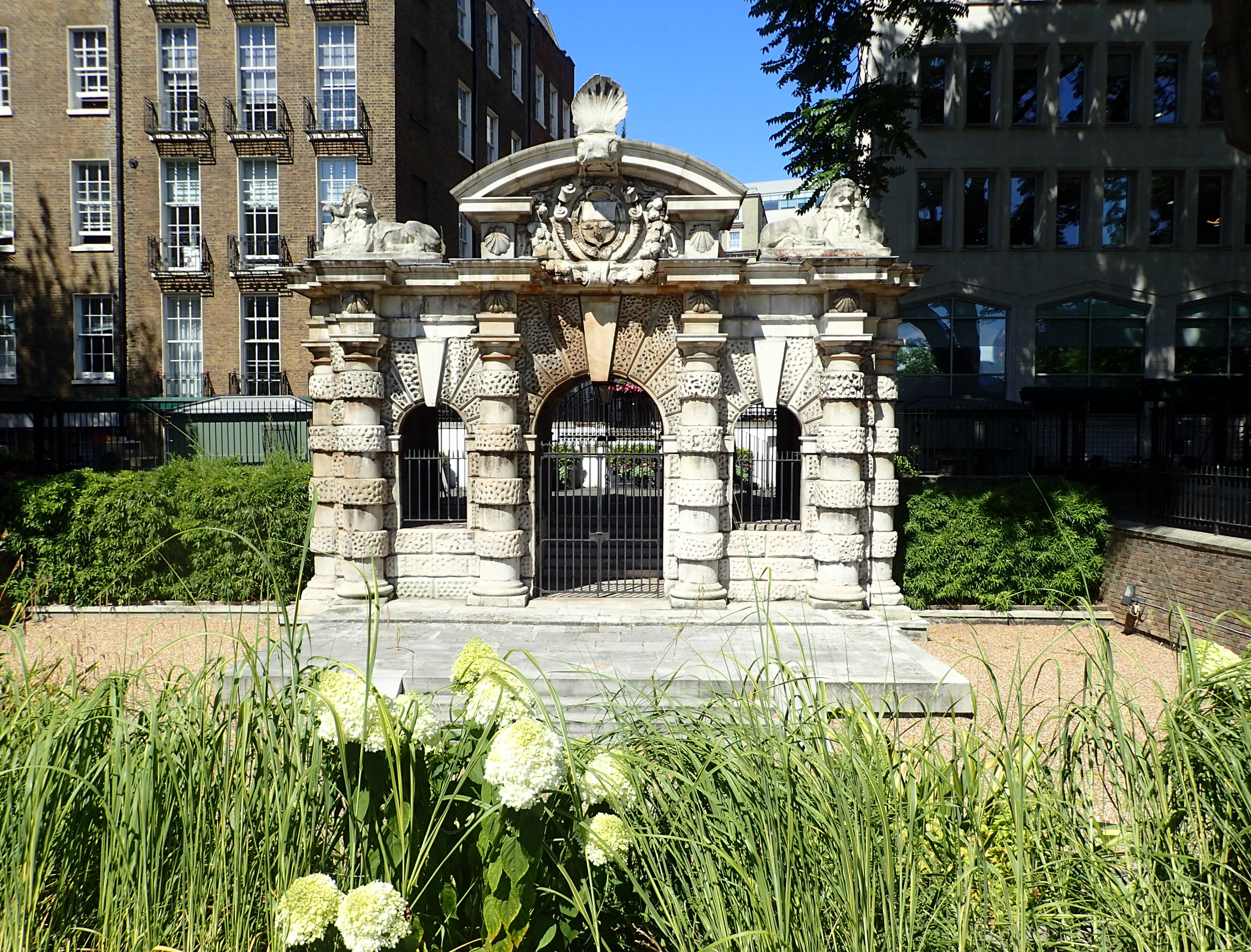
York Watergate as it stands today

York Watergate is a Grade I listed gate in the Victoria Embankment Gardens that previously fronted onto the River Thames.

== History ==
The gate was erected in the grounds of York House around 1626, one of many mansions that lined the Strand, a favoured site for access to the river. Its original purpose was to serve as a decorative entrance to the grounds of York House on the river. The house itself had come into the hands of George Villiers, 1st Duke of Buckingham only two years earlier and it appears it was originally intended to be rebuilt.

The gate along with a surrounding terrace walk would be central to the property's identity into the 19th century, with a clause in any lease or sale agreements guaranteeing right of access for them. It would function to some extent as it was originally intended until the building of the Victoria Embankment in the 1860s, where gardens have been laid out around the gate. Some time before this however, additional embankments and piers had been added.

== Architecture ==
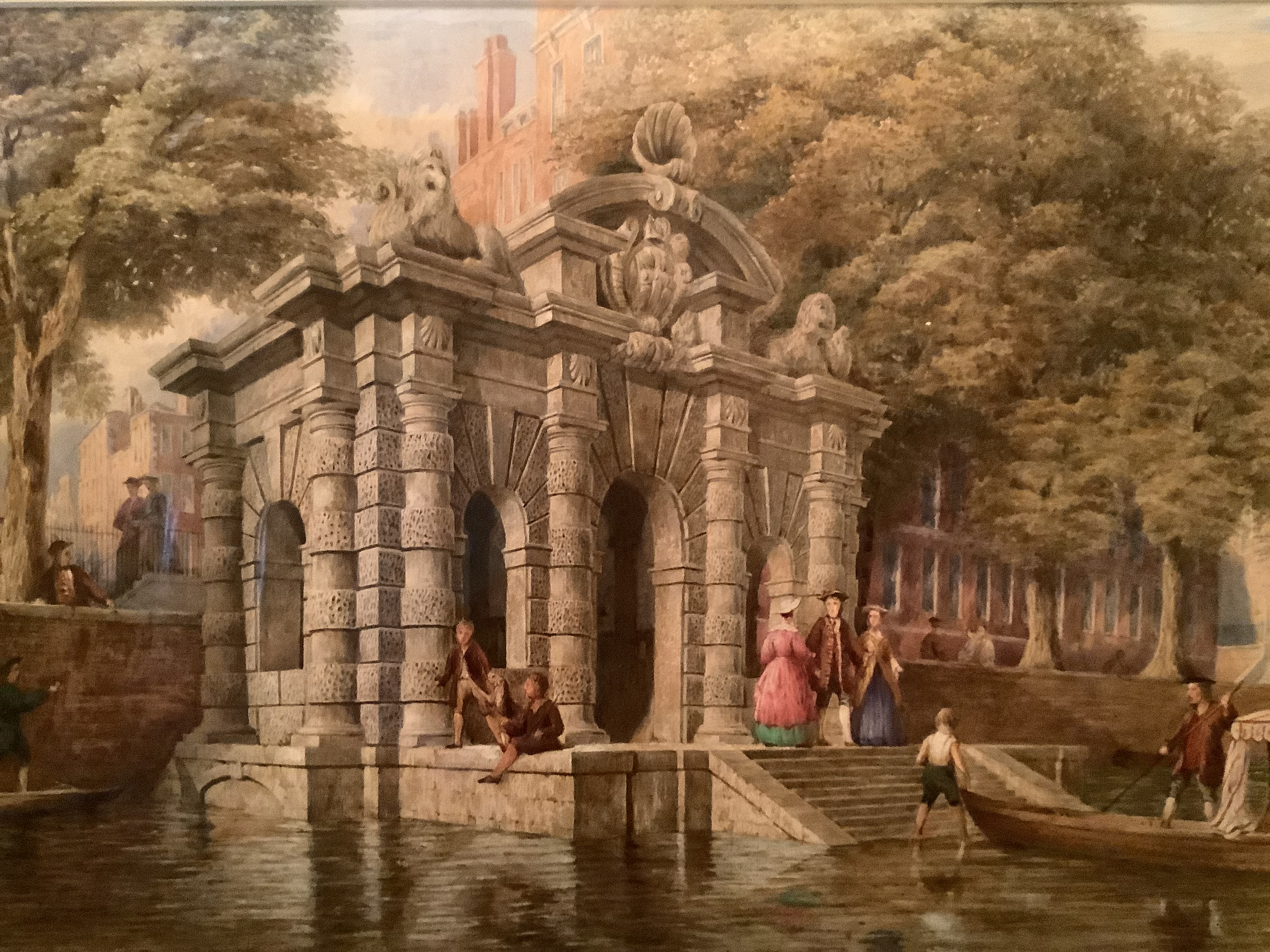
A depiction of York Watergate by George Belton Moore, the gate is shown still serving its original function

The gate was erected by Nicholas Stone, and while its design was also attributed to him by his grand-nephew, this is less certain, with various other architects having been given. Among them Balthazar Gerbier is often cited, the gate being in a similar style to much of his work. He had also worked significantly on York House, the grounds of which the gate was set within. Inigo Jones has also been raised as a possible candidate.

Its design shows architectural inspiration from the Medici Fountain in Paris, being rendered in a Baroque style, potentially encouraged by Charles I's taste for the Italianate. It is a tripartite gate built in Portland stone with a pediment over the central arch displaying the arms of the owner of York House, George Villiers. The pediment is flanked by two lions couchant either side, which appear to have greater consensus as being the design of Nicholas Stone.

== Depictions in art ==
York Watergate has been depicted by various artists, often including the nearby York Buildings Water Tower. Among artists who have produced work on the gate are Thomas Malton, William Marlow, Canaletto, and George Belton Moore.
