= Whitehall Group =

Circle of art collectors associated with Charles I of England

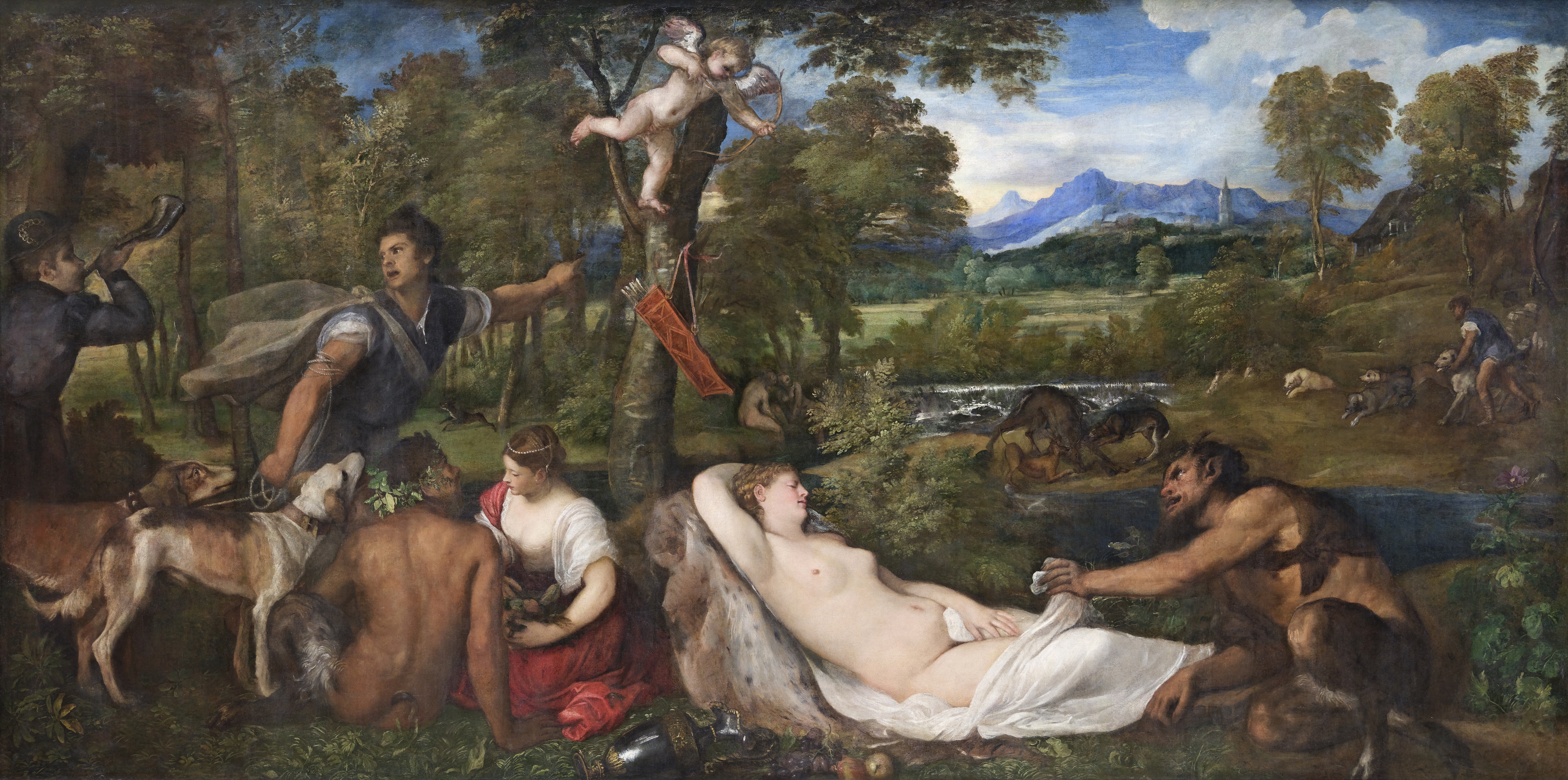
The Pardo Venus, by Titian, now Louvre, 196 x 385 cm. This was presented to Charles by the King of Spain on his trip there in 1623.

The Whitehall group (or less frequently, Whitehall Circle) is a term applied to a small circle of art connoisseurs, collectors, and patrons, closely associated with King Charles I, who introduced a taste for the Italian old masters to England. The term usually includes the advisors and agents who facilitated the group's acquisition of works of art.

== Usage ==
The term "Whitehall Group" was used by Oliver Millar in a magazine article in 1956 and subsequently in a 1958 book. He used the term "Whitehall Circle" in a book published in 1971. The term encompasses King Charles I himself and a number of his close associates including the Duke of Buckingham, the Earl of Arundel, the 3rd and 4th Earls of Pembroke, the Earl of Northumberland and the Duke of Hamilton. Between them, they introduced a taste for the Italian old masters to England. 16th century Italian paintings were more highly valued than Dutch pictures. The group also commissioned new works from the largely foreign-born artists and craftsmen whom they lured to work in London.

Arundel was perhaps the most dedicated connoisseur of the group, whilst Hamilton may have taken an interest in art collecting simply to gain the ear of the King. The group acquired works through a remarkable network of advisors, agents, dealers and ambassadors who fed the royal taste for art and had a significant influence in the formation of the group's collections. These included William Petty, Sir Dudley Carleton, Balthazar Gerbier, Ben Jonson and Inigo Jones.

== Activities ==
Following the accession of Charles I, art and collecting became an integral part of life at court. The group were able to exploit the low cost of paintings to accumulate significant collections in a short time. They collected paintings and other works of art including sculptures and tapestries. These were more highly prized than paintings in the 17th century. As far as paintings were concerned, they were primarily interested in acquisition of old masters, but did commission new works by outstanding contemporary artists such as Rubens and van Dyck. Between them they produced what Alex Trumble described as "the most spectacular but short-lived episode in British connoisseurship". As a result of the Group's activities, on the eve of the Civil War, the area of London close to the Strand which included the London homes of most members of the group, contained some of the finest pictures in the world.

== Members of the Group ==
=== King Charles I ===
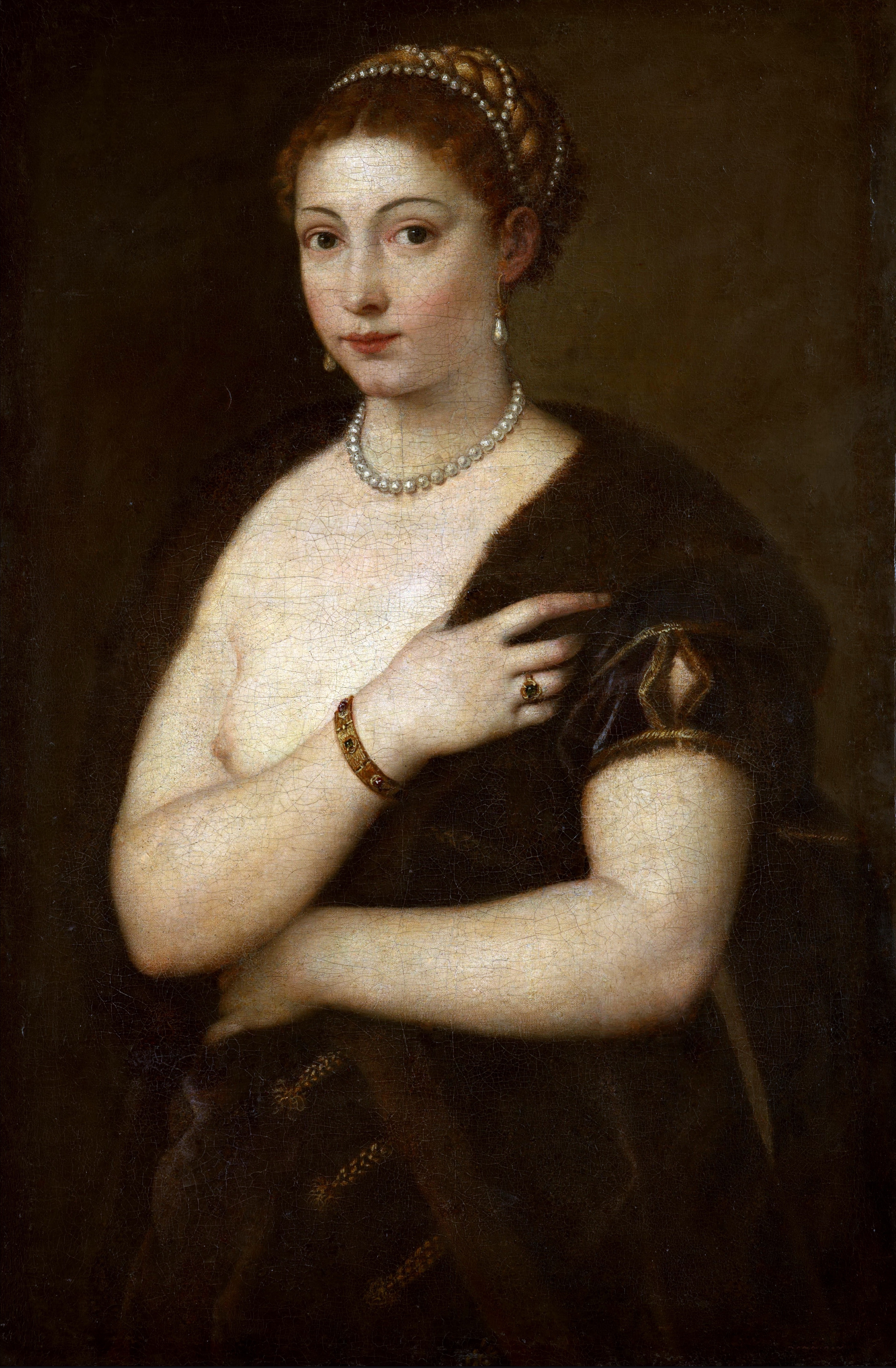
Woman in a fur wrap by Titian, once part of Charles I's collection, now in the Kunsthistorisches Museum, Vienna

King Charles I was the most passionate and generous collector of art among the British monarchs, and saw art as a way of promoting his grandiose view of the monarchy. His interest in art was initially stimulated by his elder brother, Henry, and his enthusiasm was subsequently encouraged by George Villiers, 1st Duke of Buckingham. One of his first acquisitions was Woman in a fur wrap (right) bought in a Madrid market while he and Buckingham were attempting to secure Charles's marriage to the sister of King Phillip IV. In the space of about twenty years, King Charles put together one of the largest collections of works of art in Europe, relying "on the eyes and ears of a number of agents and connoisseurs". Charles bought extensively from Italy where economic conditions meant that collection owners needed to raise money. In 1628, he bought the fabulous collection that the Gonzagas of Mantua were forced to dispose of. As a result of this, his collection rivalled that of the King of Spain. His interest in art also resulted in him being given works by European rulers attempting to gain favour or as part of marriage negotiations.

Following his accession in 1625 he tried to bring leading foreign painters to England. In 1626, he was able to persuade Orazio Gentileschi to settle in England, later to be joined by his daughter Artemisia and some of his sons. Rubens, who eventually came to London in 1630 on a diplomatic mission, was an especial target. While in London Rubens painted and later supplied more paintings from Antwerp. He was very well-treated during his nine-month visit, during which he was knighted. Charles eventually persuaded Ruben's pupil, Van Dyck, to settle in London.

Charles employed English and foreign court painters from whom he commissioned new works. In addition to Van Dyck, these included Cornelius Johnson and Daniel Mytens. Van Dyck's portraits, particularly those on horseback that disguised the fact that Charles was very short (less than 5 feet (1.5 m) tall), presented an authoritative and majestic image of the King.

Much of his collection was put up for sale during the protectorate. Both Spanish and French collectors were active in obtaining paintings and a number of the best works are now in European collections. However, many of the works that were still in England at the time of the restoration were returned and now form part of the Royal Collection.

=== Thomas Howard, Earl of Arundel ===
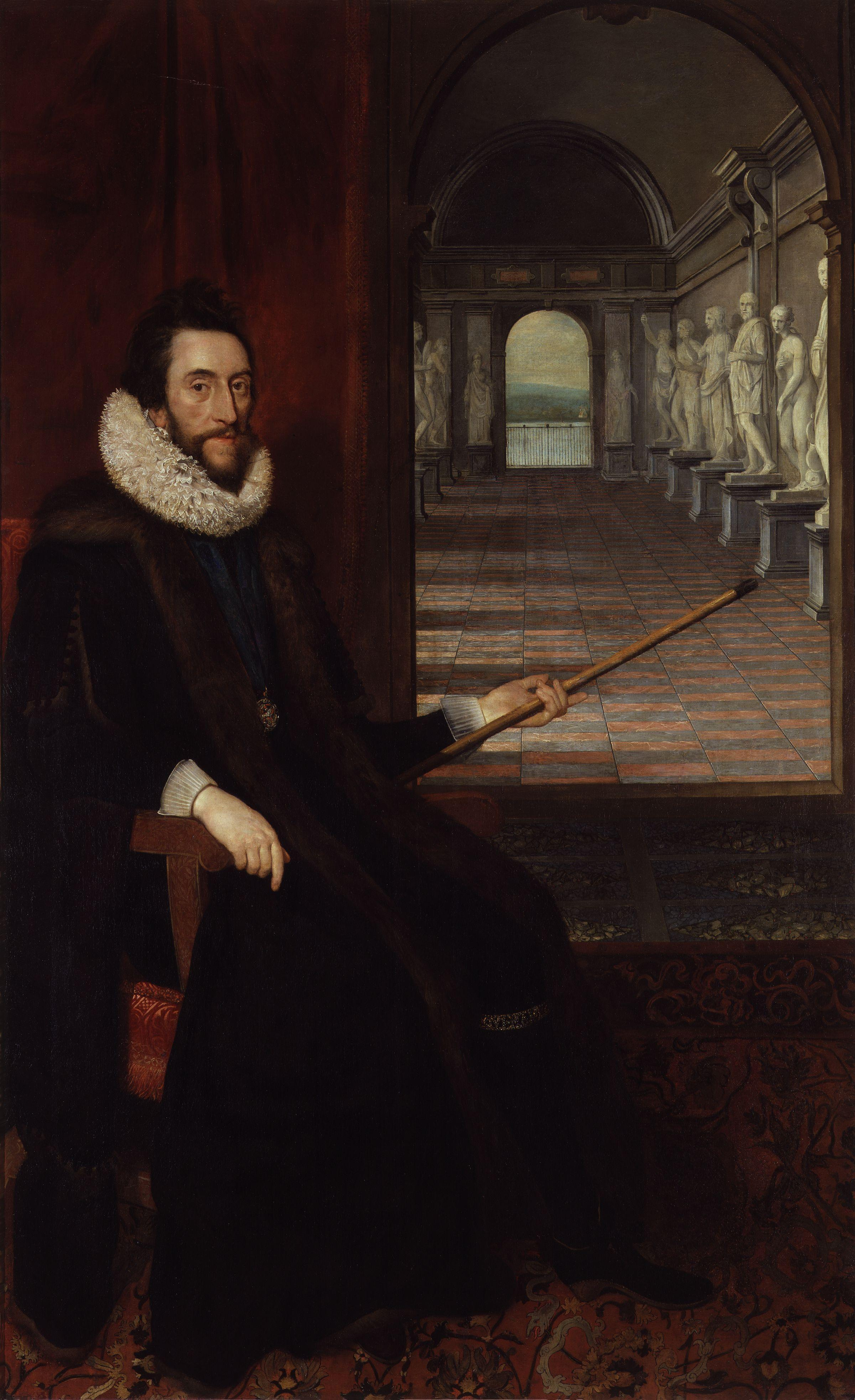
The Earl of Arundel with his sculpture gallery in the background

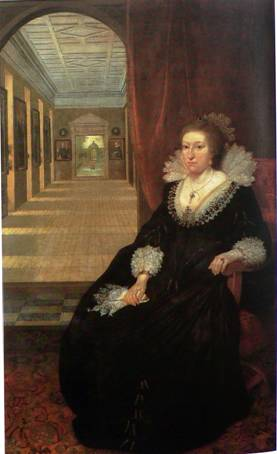
The Countess of Arundel with the picture gallery in the background

Thomas, Earl of Arundel (sometimes known as "the collector earl") and his wife Aletheia were dedicated art connoisseurs. They were arguably the greatest collectors in early Stuart England. Thomas had gained some works from the collection of his uncle, Baron Lumley. In 1613, Arundel and his wife paid an extended visit to Italy in the company of Inigo Jones and 34 attendants (among whom was William Petty). In Venice, they were joined by Sir Dudley Carleton who was the ambassador to Venice.

When the Countess inherited a third of her father's estate they were able to pursue their passion for collection. Their activities in collecting statues and paintings was emphasised in a pair of portraits painted by Daniël Mijtens by depicting them in front of their sculpture and picture galleries.

They fled abroad as a result of the Civil War. Their collection was slowly dispersed because of the need to sell to support themselves. When Arundel died, he still possessed 700 paintings, along with large collections of sculpture, books, prints, drawings, and antique jewelry. Most of his collection of marble carvings, known as the Arundel marbles, was eventually left to the University of Oxford. What remained of the collection was sold by their son, following Aletheia's death.

=== George Villiers, 1st Duke of Buckingham ===
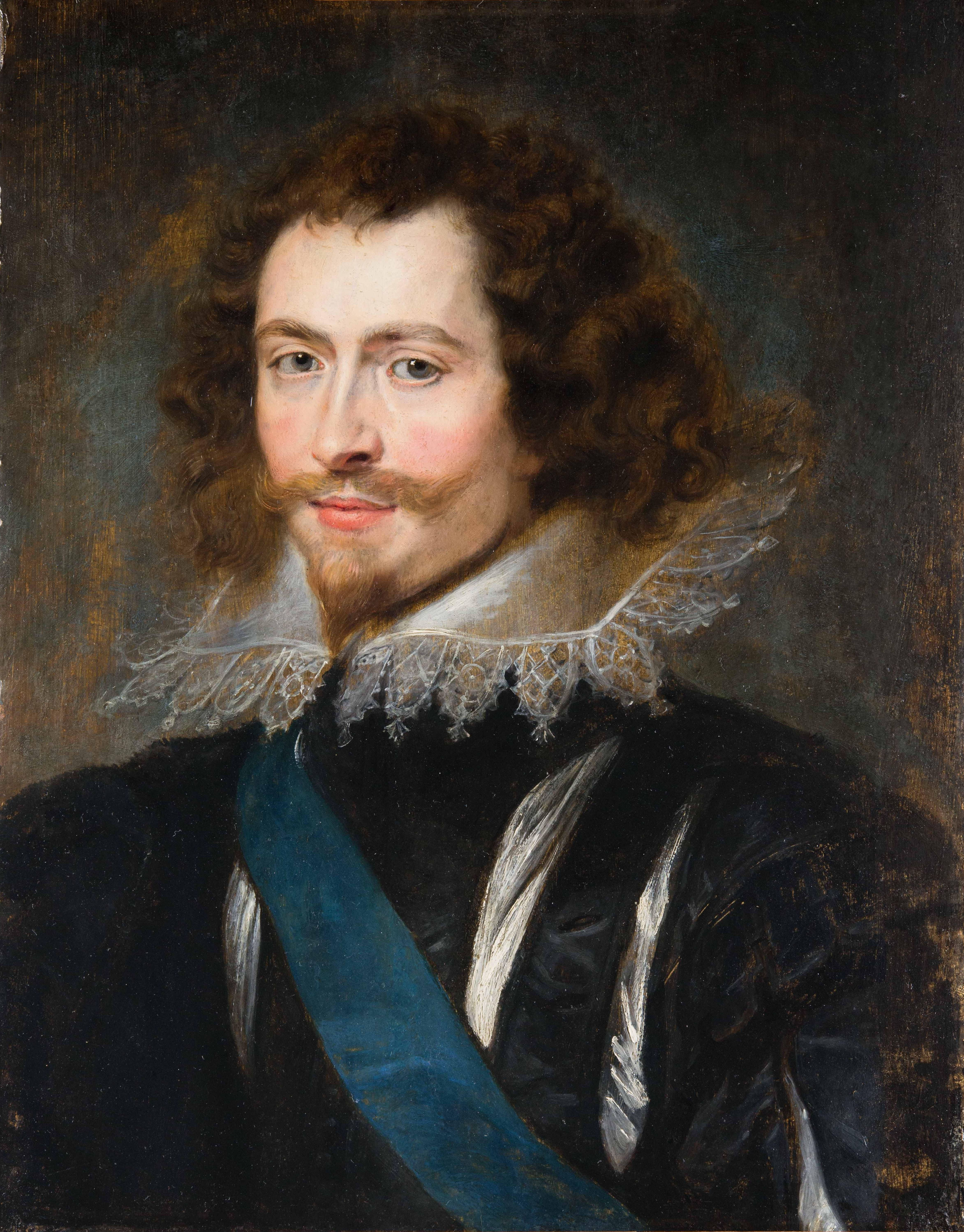
The Duke of Buckingham, 1625, by the workshop of Peter Paul Rubens Palazzo Pitti (Florence)

Buckingham was a favourite of both James I and Charles I. He was a great collector of works of art which were on show at York House, his London residence. Buckingham accompanied Charles (then Prince of Wales) to Madrid and saw first hand the Spanish King's art collection. Buckingham employed Balthazar Gerbier to collect paintings for him. Gerbier went to Rome in November 1624, on a buying expedition for him. In 1635, following Buckingham's death, an inventory of his collection was prepared. Subsequently, the collection was sequestrated by Parliament and some works were "embezzled". Parliament ordered that paintings of the Trinity or the Virgin should be destroyed, but this does not seem to have happened. In due course, parts of the collection were bought by the Earl of Northumberland and Abbot Montague, while other parts were sold at auction in 1758.

=== William Herbert, 3rd Earl of Pembroke ===
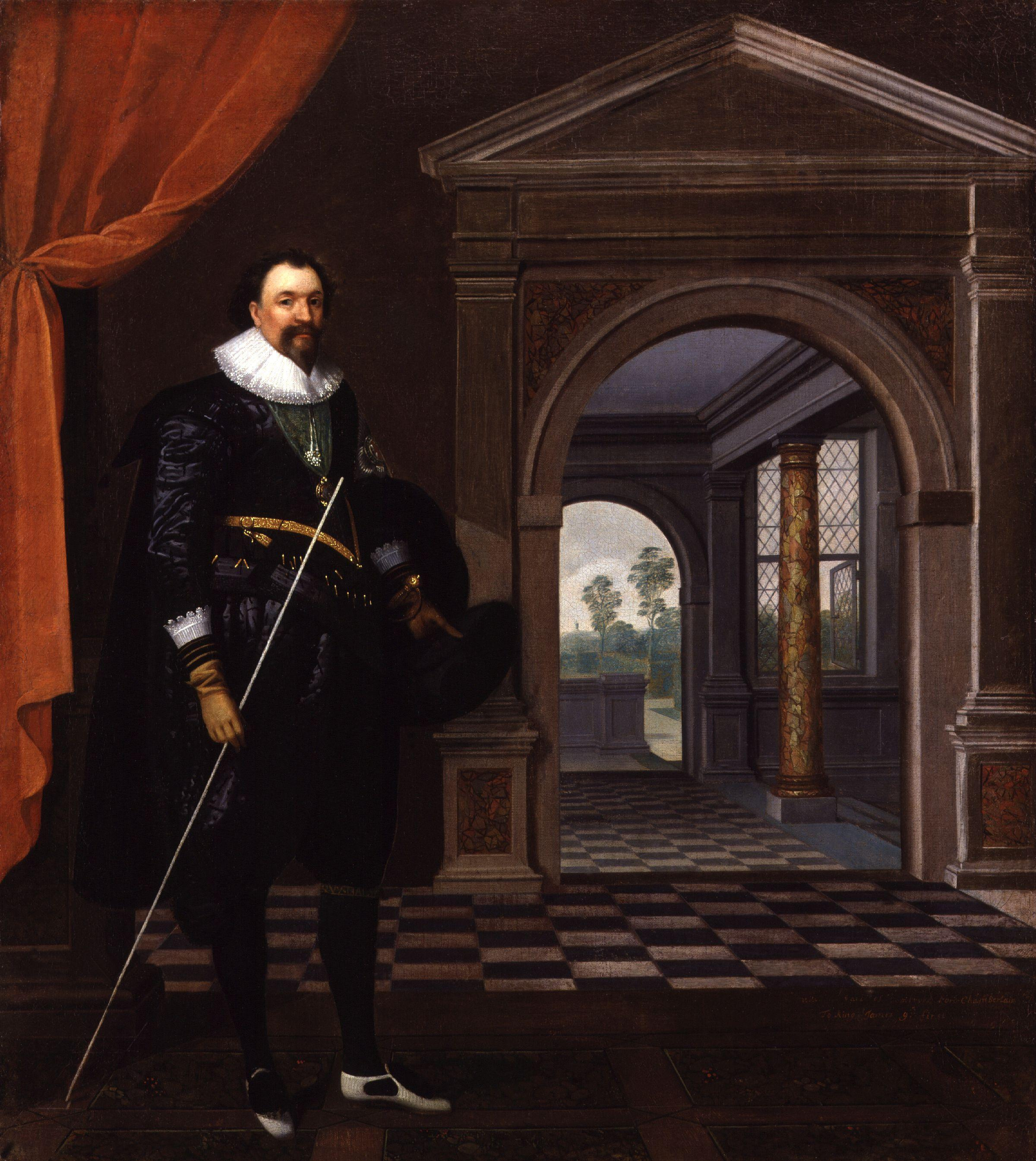
William Herbert, 3rd Earl of Pembroke by Daniel Mytens

He was a courtier and important patron of art who held office under both James I and Charles I. Both Ben Jonson and Inigo Jones benefited from his patronage. Herbert appears to have paid for Inigo Jones to tour Italy in 1605.

=== Philip Herbert, 4th Earl of Pembroke ===
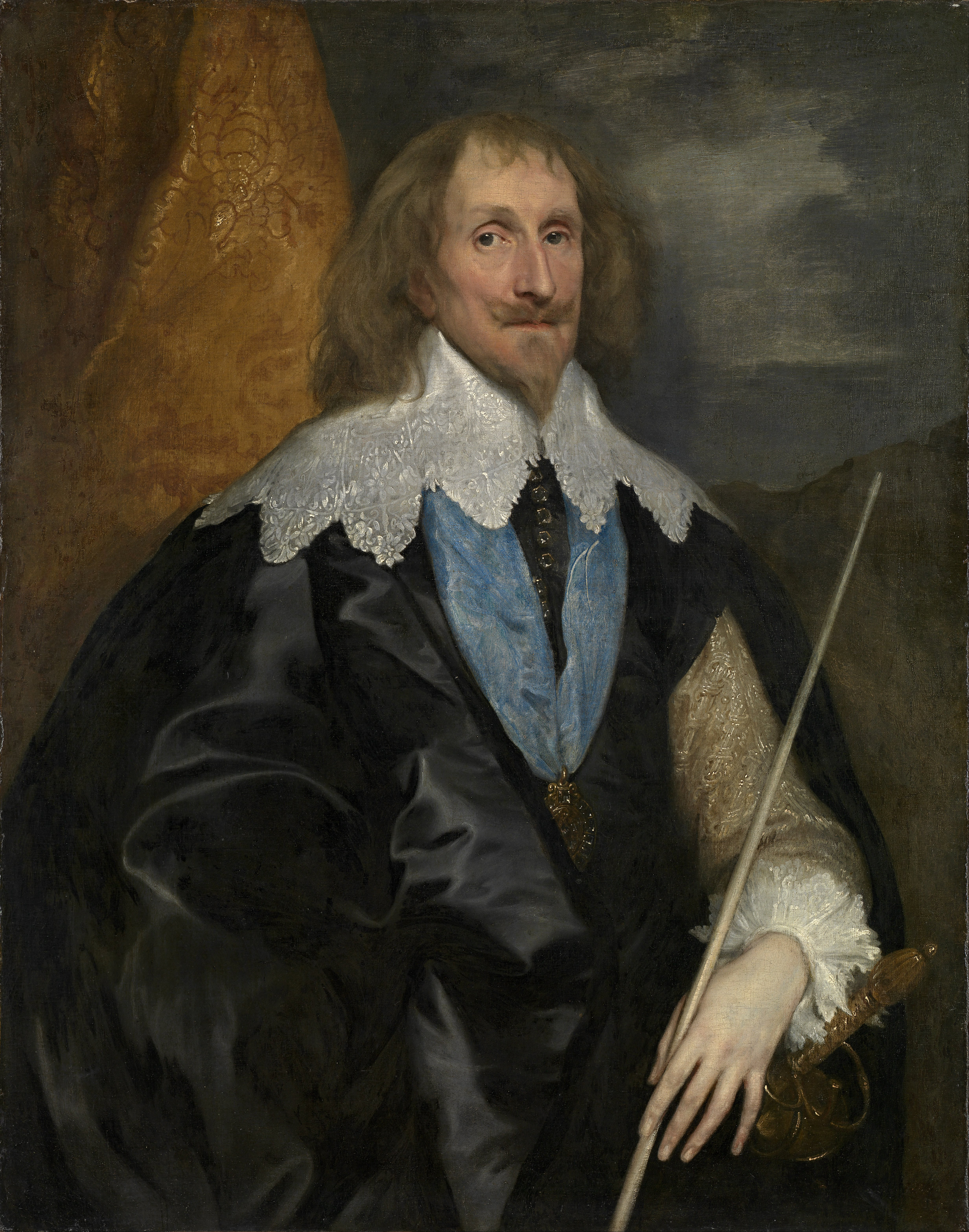
Philip Herbert, 4th Earl of Pembroke by Anthony van Dyck

He inherited both the title and art collection on the death of his brother, the 3rd Earl in 1630. According to Aubrey, he "exceedingly loved paintings" and was "the great patron of Sir Anthony van Dyck.

As he supported Parliament in the Civil War, his collection remained more or less intact. It is displayed at Wilton House in Wiltshire. Inigo Jones was involved in the redesign of the house in the 17th century including the single cube room which houses part of the collection.

=== James Hamilton, Earl of Arran, later 3rd Marquis and 1st Duke of Hamilton ===
In 1623, Hamilton accompanied his father to join Charles, Prince of Wales and Buckingham in Spain, where he saw for the first time the works of major European artists. Although younger than other members of the group, Hamilton became noted as an art collector. Between 1636 and 1638 he acquired 600 paintings. When he died, many of his paintings went to Antwerp and some can be seen in the background of Views of the Archduke's Picture Gallery by Teniers.

== Advisors and agents ==
=== Balthazar Gerbier ===
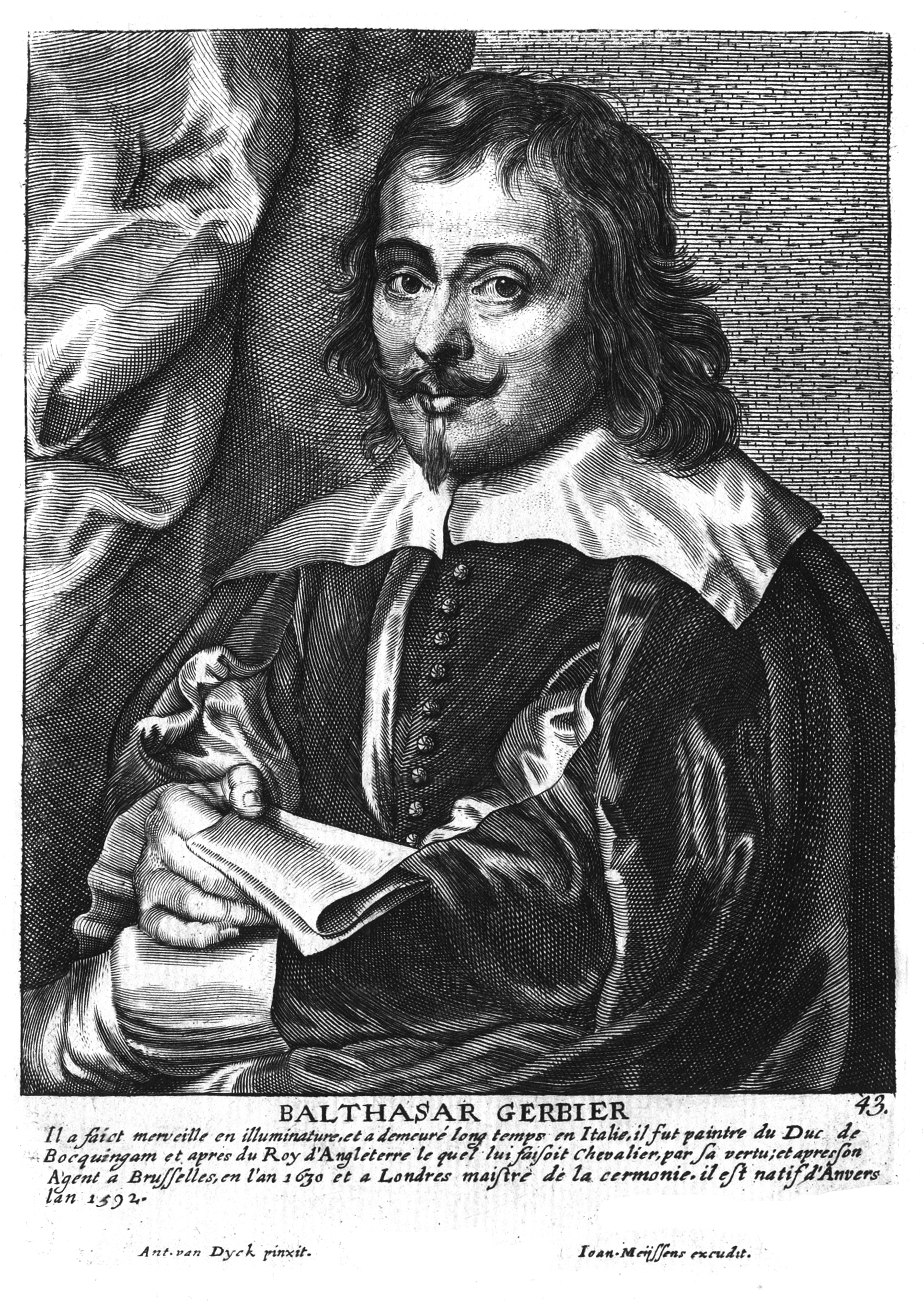
Balthasar Gerbier in Het Gulden Cabinet, p 249

Gerbier accompanied the then Prince of Wales and the Duke of Buckingham on their quixotic visit to Madrid attempting to marry a Spanish princess. Gerbier took the two of them on visits to Spanish royal and noble picture collections, which awakened the interest of Charles in what could be achieved by art. He also accompanied Buckingham to Paris when Charles married Henrietta Maria by proxy. He acted as Buckingham's agent in Italy and the southern Netherlands.

Buckingham provided lodgings for Gerbier at his London residence, York House. Gerbier continued to act on behalf of Buckingham and (after Buckingham's assassination) other members of the Whitehall group. In 1640, he wrote to both the King and the Earl of Arundel announcing the death of Rubens and pointing out the opportunity this provided to acquire fine paintings.

=== Daniel Nijs ===
Daniel Nijs was "a strange, shadowy, Flemish dealer who knew Italy well". In 1621 he facilitated the purchase of Titian's Ecce Homo by Gerbier for the Duke of Buckingham. Nijs was involved in a transaction by which a collection of paintings and sculptures went via Sir Dudley Carleton to the Earl of Arundel. Along with Nicholas Lanier, he also acted as agent for Charles I when he acquired the Garganza collection.

=== William Petty ===
Petty was chaplain to the Earl of Arundel. Petty was born at Soulby in Westmorland, and after Grammar School in Kendal, went to Christ's College, Cambridge. After teaching at Beverley he got a Fellowship at Jesus College, Cambridge. He joined Arundel's household in 1613, and was included on the trip to Heidelberg and Italy with Inigo Jones. Arundel trained him in art appreciation. Petty subsequently worked as an agent for Arundel for many years in Italy, Greece and Asia Minor. Charles I employed him as his agent in Venice at the sale of paintings from the collection of Bartolomeo della Nave in July 1634. The king made an arrangement to divide any purchases equally between himself and three other stakeholders.

=== Inigo Jones ===
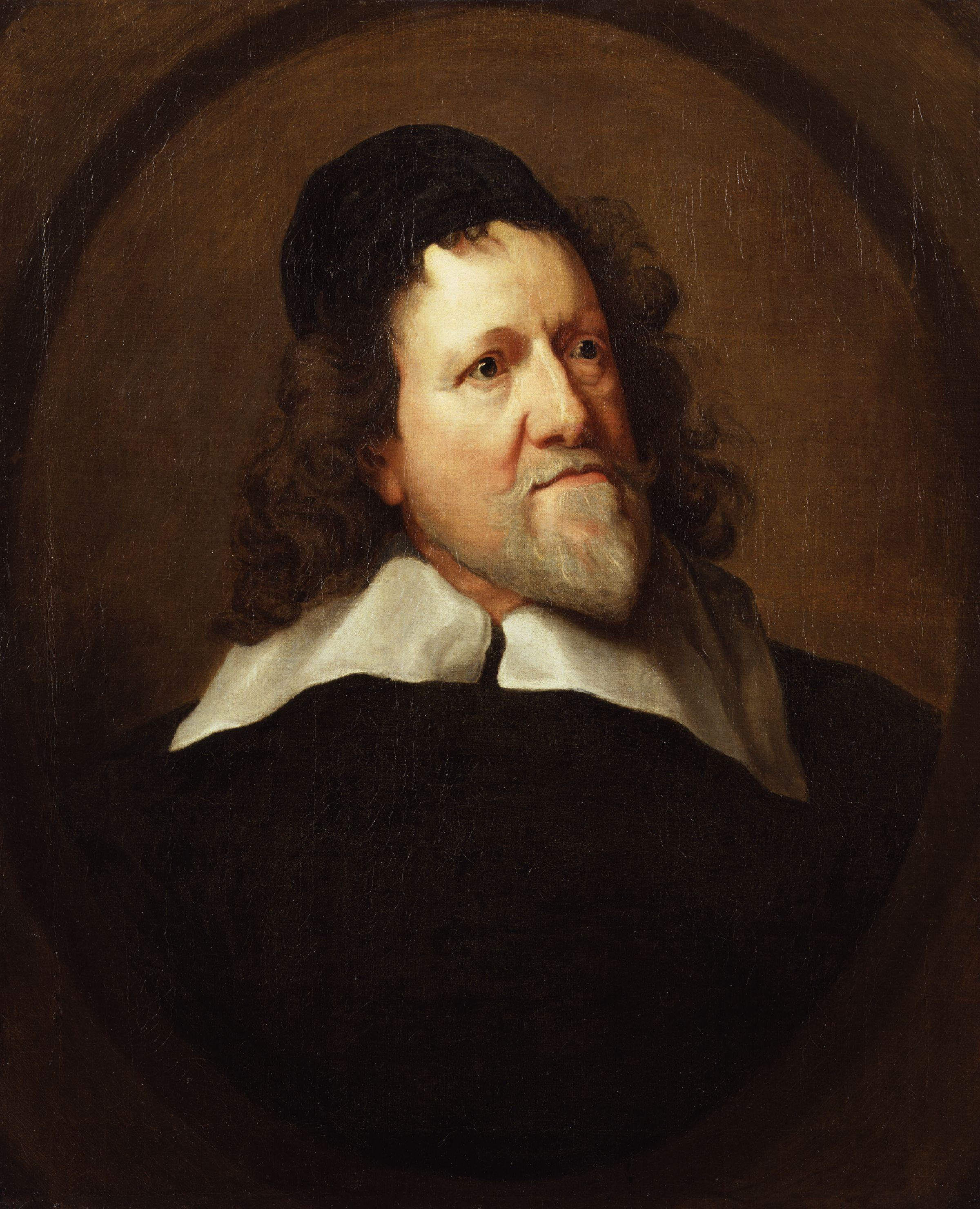
Inigo Jones, by Anthony Van Dyck

Jones was an architect, artist and connoisseur who was employed in the court of Charles I. He exercised the most influence over court culture by organising many Court Masques and incorporating images from the group's collections in their backdrop. He accompanied the Arundels on their visit to Italy. In 1628, he was instructed (along with Nicholas Lanier) to put together an inventory of Charles I works of art.

=== Sir Dudley Carleton (later Viscount Dorchester) ===
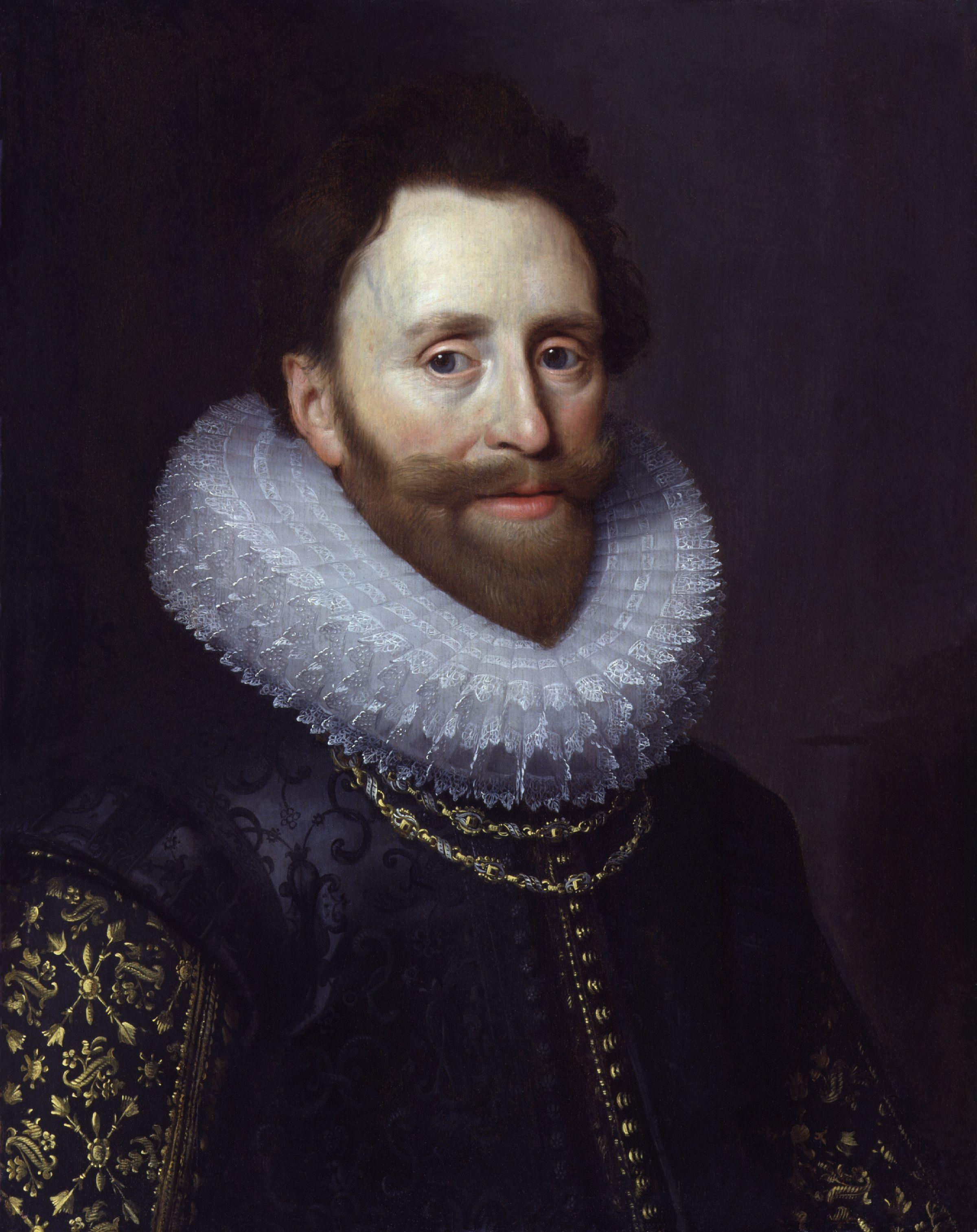
Portrait of Dudley Carleton by Michiel Jansz van Mierevelt, circa 1620

In 1610, Carleton was knighted and sent as ambassador to Venice. He began to look for works of art for Charles (then Duke of York) and other members of the Whitehall group.

In 1616, he was appointed ambassador to the Netherlands. He continued his interests in the art trade, exchanging statues for paintings with Rubens. He served as an intermediary for collectors such as Pembroke, Buckingham and Arundel to whom he sent paintings by Daniel Mytens and Gerard van Honthorst.

=== Abraham van der Doort ===
Portrait of Abraham van der Doort, by William Dobson.

Van der Doort initially worked for Prince Henry and on his death, van der Doort moved in to the service of Charles I. He was Surveyor of the King's Pictures for Charles and maintained an inventory of the King's art collection. The catalogue survives as a complete manuscript and was described by Ellis Waterhouse as "the fullest catalogues of their day in Europe."

=== Nicholas Lanier ===
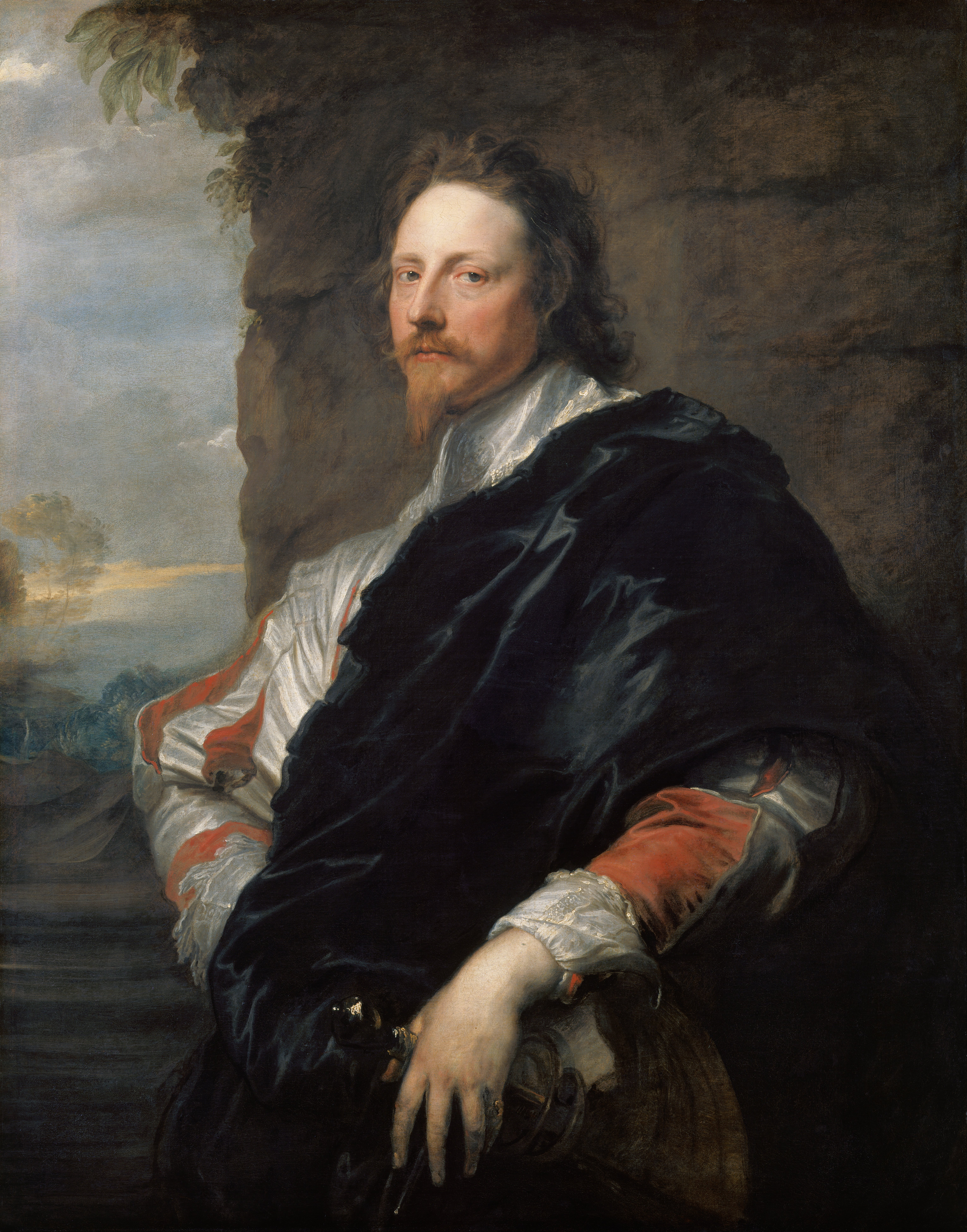
Nicholas Lanier by Sir Anthony van Dyck

Nicholas Lanier was Master of the King's Music. He went to Italy in 1625, buying paintings on behalf of the King, including working with Daniel Nye to acquire the Gonzaga (Mantuan) collection. He was subsequently instructed (along with Inigo Jones) to put together an inventory of Charles I works of art.

=== Ben Jonson ===
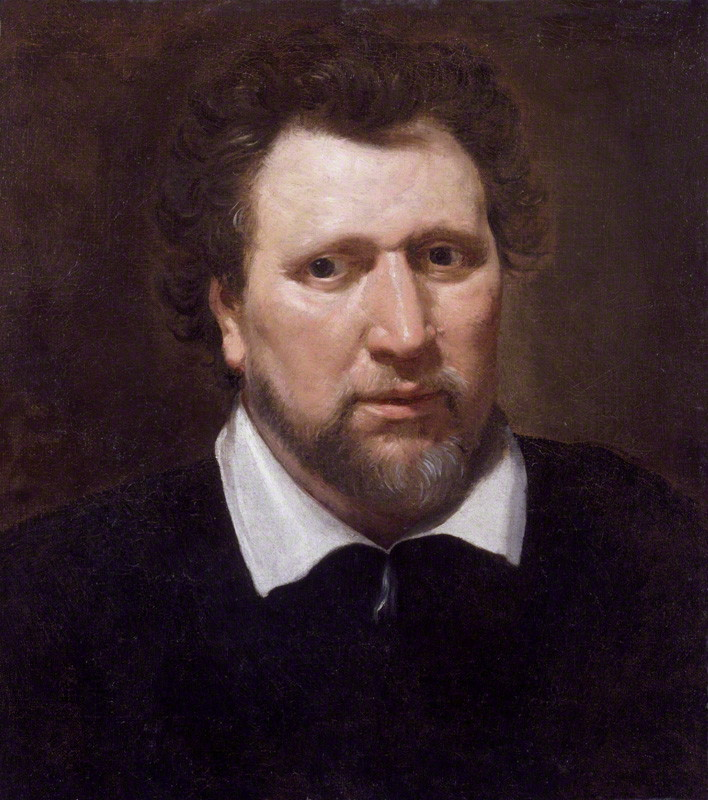
Ben Jonson by Abraham van Blyenberch

Ben Jonson was a classically educated, well-read and cultured man of the English Renaissance whose cultural influence was of unparalleled breadth. He "lived most of his life in close proximity to the English court at Whitehall, and the court figures prominently in his writings".

In 1604 he became known to some members of the group as the author of a court masque for James I. He was supported by members of the group, including the Earl of Pembroke to whom Jonson dedicated a collection of epigrams. Over the thirty years following the first masque, Jonson was the author of more than one masque per year, often collaborating with Inigo Jones. These masques helped shape the art of the Caroline court.

He was able to make lasting friendships and call upon the hospitality of the great and the good of Jacobean society. In addition to his court masques, he also received commissions from aristocratic patrons who needed to mount private festivals in honour of royal guests.
