= Robert Ibbitson =

17th-century publisher (1648–1654)

- Occupation: publisher

Robert Ibbitson (fl. 1648–1654) was a 17th-century publisher in London.

== Publications ==
- Balthazar Gerbier (1650), The First Lecture being an Introduction to the Military Architecture, or Fortifications, London: Printed ... for Robert Ibbitson, OL 15016969M
- Balthazar Gerbier (1650), The Art of Wellspeaking, London: Printed for Robert Ibbitson, OL 16769793M
