= Ibbetson =

Ibbetson is a surname. Notable people with the surname include:

- Agnes Ibbetson (1757–1823), English vegetable physiologist
- Arthur Ibbetson (1922–1997), British cinematographer
- David Ibbetson, British legal scholar
- Denzil Ibbetson, KCSI (1847–1908), administrator in British India and an author
- Henry Selwin-Ibbetson, 1st Baron Rookwood (1826–1902), 7th Baronet 1869–1892, and British Conservative politician
- Julius Caesar Ibbetson (1759–1817), British 18th-century landscape and watercolour painter
- Levett Landon Boscawen Ibbetson (1799–1869), 19th century geologist, inventor, organiser and soldier
- Robert Ibbetson (1789–1880), colonial governor of the Straits Settlements of Penang, Malacca, and Singapore from 1832 to 1834

== See also ==
- Peter Ibbetson, 1891 novel by George du Maurier and multiple adaptations of that novel in several mediums
