= John Greville Fennell =

British artist, naturalist, and angler (1807–1885)

John Greville Fennell (1807–1885) was a British artist, naturalist, and angler.

== Life ==
Fennell was born at sea between Ireland and England in 1807. He began his career as an artist by winning the silver medal offered by the Duke of Sussex for a drawing of Hercules, and afterwards was a student at Finden's house, where he was intimate with Hablot Knight Browne, who was similarly employed. As a young man Fennell succeeded best in comic painting, but later in life was fonder of landscapes. In some of these, however, he was very careless, and was always unequal in his work. He drew pictures of the tournament at Eglinton Castle for the ‘Illustrated London News.’ His fondness for natural history displayed itself chiefly in observations on the habits of fish and waterside birds.

These he carried on simultaneously with the practice of angling, of which he was a devoted follower, especially in the River Thames. He was a member of the 'Field' staff from the commencement of that paper in 1853, and wrote week after week in it on fishing subjects; besides which he was a frequent contributor to the 'Fishing Gazette' and other sporting papers on angling and outdoor pursuits. He was author of 'The Book of the Roach,’ 1870, an exhaustive treatise on angling for that fish; and contributed a paper called 'Curiosities of Angling Literature' to Mr. Cholmondeley Pennell's 'Fishing Gossip,’ 1866. This is a discursive attempt at the humorous style in writing on angling topics, which was at that time fashionable. He also wrote 'The Rail and the Rod,’ a meritorious guide book to the favourite angling resorts of the Thames.

Generous to a fault, and an excellent practical angler, Fennell was never so happy as when relating to a circle of friends reminiscences of Dickens, Thackeray, Douglas Jerrold, Mackay, and Harrison Ainsworth, with all of whom he had been on intimate terms. He lived long at Barnes, and late in life at Henley, at both of which places he was favourably situated for the pursuit of angling. At the latter town he died suddenly on 13 January 1885, in the seventy-eighth year of his age, and was buried in Trinity churchyard, not a hundred yards from the house in which he spent his last two years, under the appropriate epitaph, 'The fishers also shall mourn, and all they that cast angle into the brooks shall lament'.
