= Victoria Embankment Gardens =

Park in London, England

Coordinates: 51.5080°N 0.1224°W

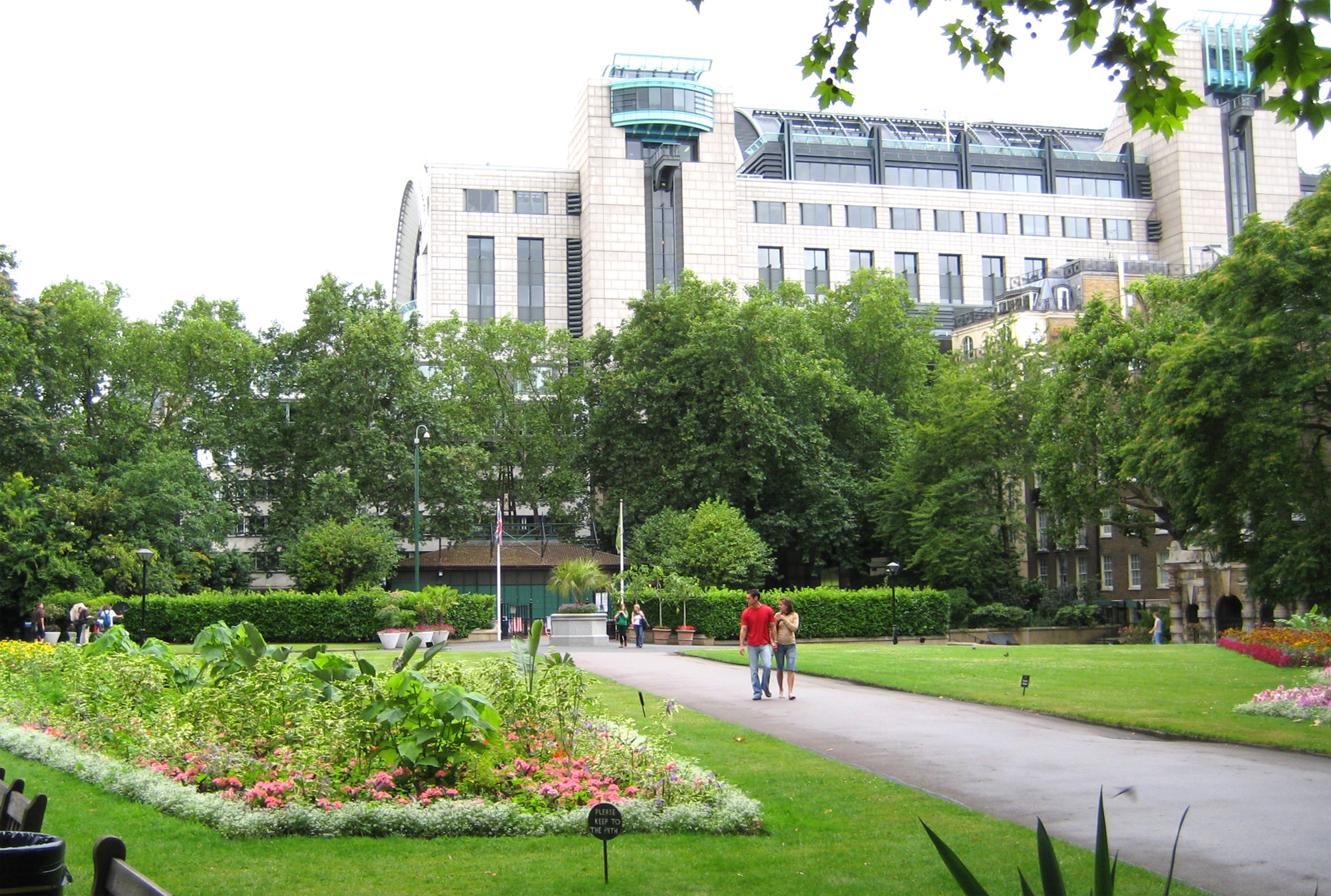
Victoria Embankment Gardens and Charing Cross railway station

The Victoria Embankment Gardens are a series of gardens on the north side of the River Thames between Blackfriars Bridge and Westminster Bridge in London.

== History ==
Victoria Embankment by C.R.W. Nevinson, 1924

Between 1865 and 1870 the northern embankment and sewer was built by Sir Joseph Bazalgette. In 1874 gardens were created on the reclaimed land on the inward side of the roadway named Victoria Embankment. There were four sections created, the Temple Garden to the east, the Main Gardens to the west (originally known as the Adelphi Gardens), and two other sections to the south following the bend of the Thames. The gardens are now under the control of the City of Westminster.

== Features ==
The gardens are fully fenced and are open during designated hours. They open at 07:30 throughout the year, but close at varying times between 16:30 during the coldest months and 21:30 at the height of summer. All gardens have gravel paths that are well lined with seats mainly given as memorials. The river side of the gardens is lined with mature trees. Grass and flower beds are spread throughout the gardens, and on warm days workers from near-by establishments can be seen having picnic lunches both on the seats and the grass.

=== Statues ===
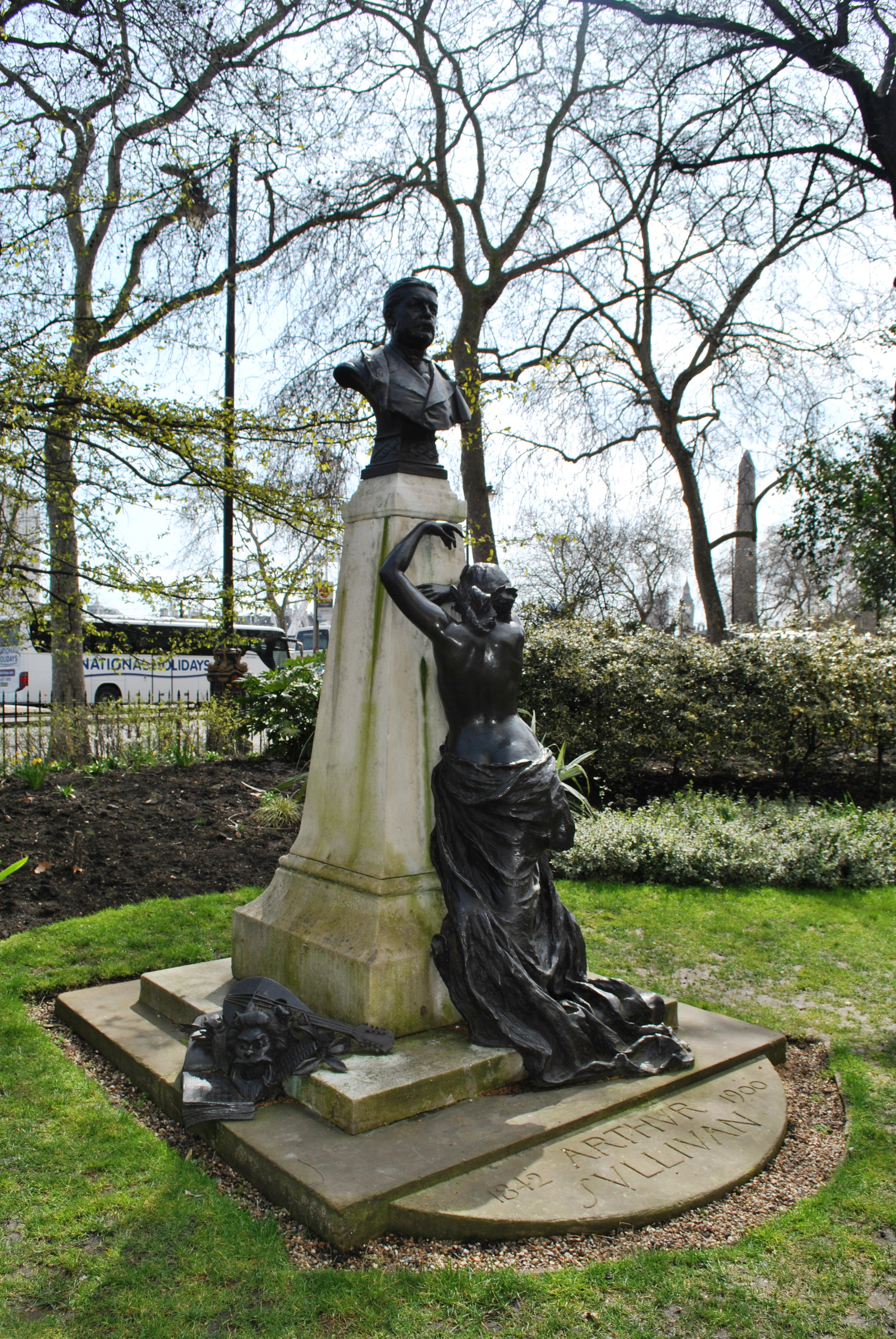
Arthur Sullivan Memorial, Victoria Embankment Gardens

In the Temple section there are statues to Isambard Kingdom Brunel and John Stuart Mill. The main section has memorials Sir Arthur Sullivan, Robert Burns, Sir Wilfred Lawson, Robert Raikes and the Imperial Camel Corps. The southern section has memorials to General Sir James Outram, General Gordon, Air Marshal Lord Trenchard, and the Chindit Memorial which also commemorates Orde Wingate.

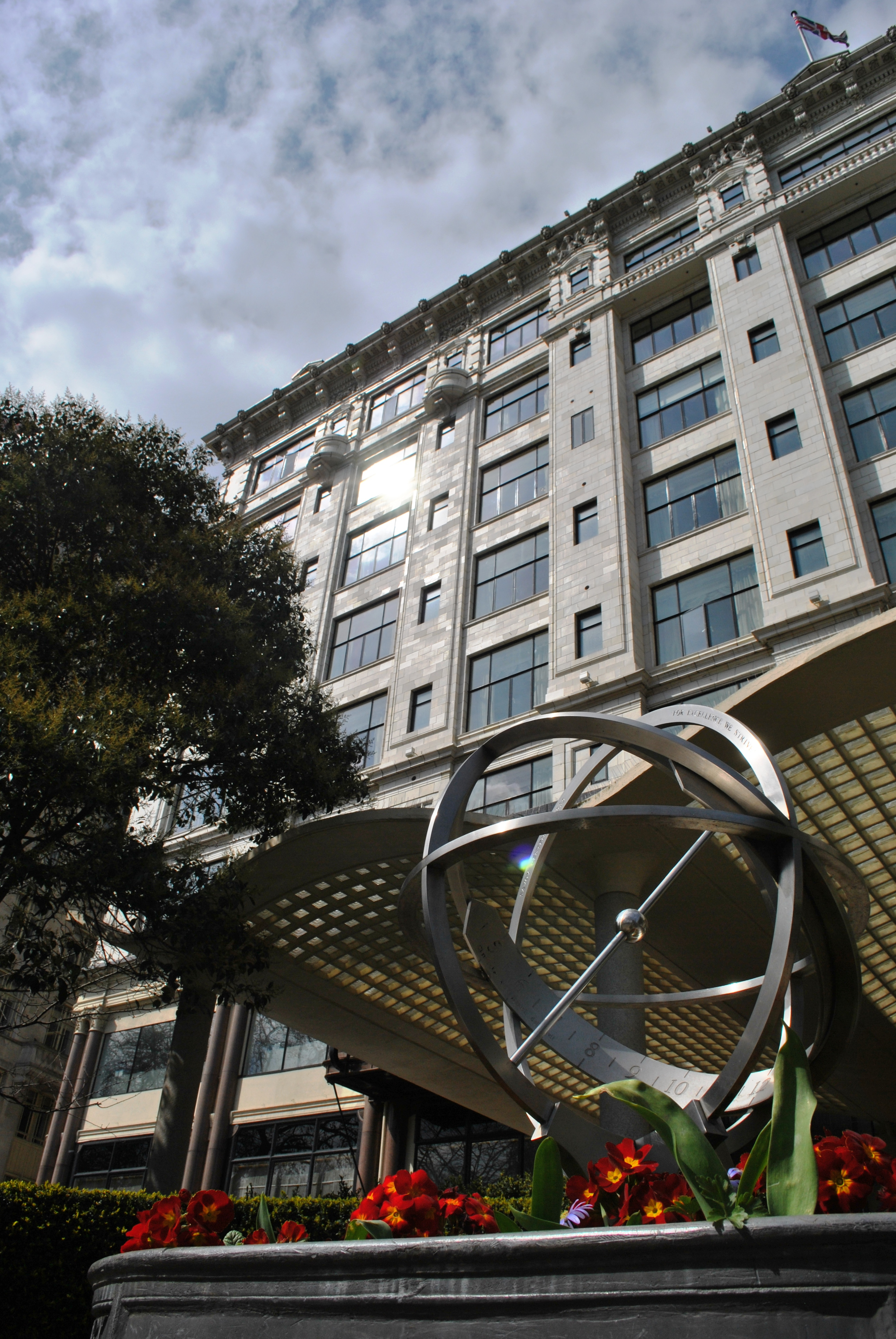
Victoria Embankment Gardens, equatorial sundial

A memorial to the British soldiers in the Korean War was unveiled in Victoria Embankment Gardens, between the River Thames and the Ministry of Defence headquarters in London, England, in December 2014.

Although not strictly a statue, there is an equatorial sundial made from stainless steel in the main garden under the Savoy, dedicated to Richard D'Oyly Carte.

=== Other facilities ===
In the main garden there is a café, open in the warmer periods, and a band shell where concerts are held daily in June and July. A charge is made for seats in the enclosure, but the concerts can easily be heard outside on the paths' seats. The York Water Gate can be seen adjacent to the Villier Street entrance. This marks the original bank of the Thames, which is now 135 metres away. Public toilets are outside the gardens' Embankment gate next to the underground station.
