= List of public art on the Victoria Embankment =

The Victoria Embankment is a road and river-walk on the north bank of the River Thames in London, formed from land reclaimed during the construction of Joseph Bazalgette's sewerage system in the late 19th century. From 1864 a sequence of public gardens called the Victoria Embankment Gardens was created from this land. Running from north-east to south-west, these are called Temple Gardens, the Main Garden, the Whitehall Garden and finally the Ministry of Defence section; the last of these was laid out in 1939–1959. Each of the four gardens features commemorative sculptures, and additional memorials are situated along the river walk and road, making the Embankment one of the primary sites for commemoration in London.

== City of London ==
Image	Title / subject	Location and coordinates	Date	Artist / designer	Architect / other	Type	Designation	Notes
More images	Dragon boundary marks	Victoria Embankment 51.5111°N 0.1116°W	1847–1849	?	James Bunstone Bunning	Statues	Grade II	
	Statue of Thomas More	Old City of London School building	1881–1882	John Daymond and Son	Davis and Emanuel	Statue in niche	Grade II	
	Statue of Francis Bacon	Old City of London School building	1881–1882	John Daymond and Son	Davis and Emanuel	Statue in niche	Grade II	
	Statue of William Shakespeare	Old City of London School building	1881–1882	John Daymond and Son	Davis and Emanuel	Statue in niche	Grade II	
	Statue of John Milton	Old City of London School building	1881–1882	John Daymond and Son	Davis and Emanuel	Statue in niche	Grade II	
	Statue of Isaac Newton	Old City of London School building	1881–1882	John Daymond and Son	Davis and Emanuel	Statue in niche	Grade II	
More images	Memorial to Queen Victoria's last visit to the City	Incorporated into the railings of Middle Temple Gardens	1902	John Daymond and Son or Charles Henry Mabey	Andrew Murray (City Surveyor)	Memorial with relief sculpture; boundary marker	—N/a	
More images	National Submarine War Memorial	Temple Pier 51.5109°N 0.1110°W	1922 and 1959	Frederick Brook Hitch	A. Heron Ryan Tenison	Plaque	Grade II*	
	Controlled Energy	Unilever House	1931–1932	William Reid Dick	J. Lomax Simpson with Burnet, Tait and Partners	Architectural sculpture	Grade II	
	Keystones	Unilever House	1931–1932	Gilbert Ledward	J. Lomax Simpson with Burnet, Tait and Partners	Architectural sculpture	Grade II	
	Two lamp standards	Unilever House	1931–1932	Walter Gilbert	J. Lomax Simpson with Burnet, Tait and Partners	Architectural sculpture	Grade II	
	Relief panels	Unilever House	1931–1932	Walter Gilbert	J. Lomax Simpson with Burnet, Tait and Partners	Architectural sculpture	Grade II	
	Abundance	Unilever House	1980	Bernard Sindall	J. Lomax Simpson with Burnet, Tait and Partners	Architectural sculpture	Grade II	
	Japanese, Nigerian and English Girls	Unilever House	1982–1983	Nicholas Monro	J. Lomax Simpson with Burnet, Tait and Partners	Architectural sculpture	Grade II	
	Stage	Bazalgette Embankment	c. 2016–2025	Nathan Coley	Hawkins\Brown	Sculpture	—N/a	
	Zig Zag	Bazalgette Embankment	c. 2016–2025	Nathan Coley	Hawkins\Brown	Sculpture	—N/a	
	Waterwall	Bazalgette Embankment	c. 2016–2025	Nathan Coley	Hawkins\Brown	Sculpture	—N/a	
	Twins	Bazalgette Embankment	c. 2016–2025	Nathan Coley	Hawkins\Brown	Sculpture	—N/a	
	Kicker	Bazalgette Embankment	c. 2016–2025	Nathan Coley	Hawkins\Brown	Sculpture	—N/a	

== City of Westminster ==
Image	Title / subject	Location and coordinates	Date	Artist / designer	Architect / other	Type	Designation	Notes
More images	Cleopatra's Needle Thutmose III and Ramesses II	Adelphi Steps, near Hungerford Bridge 51°30′31″N 0°07′13″W	c. 1450 BC	—N/a	George John Vulliamy	Obelisk	Grade I	One of a pair of obelisks erected in Heliopolis by Thutmose III; two centuries later the inscriptions to Ramesses II were added and in 12 BC they were moved to Alexandria. Presented to Britain in 1819, but not brought to London until 1878. Its companion was re-erected in Central Park, New York, in 1881.
More images	Boadicea and Her Daughters Boudica	Near Westminster Pier 51°30′04″N 0°07′26″W	1856–1883	Thomas Thornycroft and William Hamo Thornycroft	Thomas Graham Jackson	Sculptural group	Grade II	The elder Thornycroft's magnum opus, brought to completion by his son. The style of the figures was out of fashion by the time the group was installed here in 1902.
More images	Statue of Isambard Kingdom Brunel	Near Temple tube station 51°30′39″N 0°06′55″W	c. 1861	Carlo Marochetti	Richard Norman Shaw	Statue	Grade II	Erected 1877. This and Marochetti's statue of George Stephenson outside Euston station were originally planned for Parliament Square. Shaw's masonry screen, then a complete novelty but much imitated since, may have been intended to block the tube station from view.
	Lions' heads with mooring rings	Victoria Embankment, at intervals beneath lamps on the river side of the river wall	1868–1870	Timothy Butler	Joseph Bazalgette and George John Vulliamy	Lion's head masks	Grade II	The bronze masks with mooring rings were the earliest elements in the Embankment's decorative programme to be installed. For the tide to rise of the level of the lions' mouths would be a sign of severe flooding, so a saying has arisen, "if the lions drink, London will sink".
More images	Dolphin lamp standards	Victoria Embankment	1870 onwards	Charles Henry Mabey	George John Vulliamy	Lamp standards with sculptural elements	Grade II	
More images	Statue of Sir James Outram, 1st Baronet	Victoria Embankment Gardens, Whitehall Garden 51°30′21″N 0°07′24″W	1871	Matthew Noble	—N/a	Statue	Grade II	Unveiled 17 August 1871 by Lord Halifax. Permission for a statue to Outram in Trafalgar Square had been refused in 1861. Trophies of arms representing his Indian campaigns rest on the corners of the pedestal.
More images	Benches	Victoria Embankment 51°30′33″N 0°07′09″W	1872–1874	Lewis and George John Vulliamy	—N/a	Benches	Grade II	21 cast iron and timber benches set along the Embankment, all to a design depicting winged sphinxes in their terminal arm-brackets, except for that opposite the junction with Horseguards Avenue, which depicts seated camels instead.
More images	Statue of John Stuart Mill	Victoria Embankment Gardens, Temple Gardens 51°30′40″N 0°06′48″W	1878	Thomas Woolner	—N/a	Statue	Grade II	Unveiled 26 January 1878. The first statue specifically designed for a site on the Embankment.
More images	Two sphinxes	Cleopatra's Needle 51°30′31″N 0°07′13″W	1878	Charles Henry Mabey	George John Vulliamy	Statues	Grade I (with obelisk)	Modelled on a sphinx from the time of Thutmose III in the Duke of Northumberland's collection at Alnwick Castle.
More images	Statue of Robert Raikes	Victoria Embankment Gardens, Main Garden 51°30′34″N 0°07′11″W	1880	Thomas Brock	—N/a	Statue	Grade II	Unveiled 3 July 1880 by the Earl of Shaftesbury. Replicas were made in 1929 for the 150th anniversary of the first Sunday school, established by Raikes in Gloucester; they stand in that city and in Toronto.
More images	Statue of William Tyndale	Victoria Embankment Gardens, Whitehall Garden 51°30′23″N 0°07′23″W	1884	Joseph Edgar Boehm	Edward William Godwin	Statue	Grade II	Unveiled 7 May 1884. Erected by the British and Foreign Bible Society to commemorate their 80th anniversary, and the supposed 400th anniversary of Tyndale's birth.
More images	Statue of Robert Burns	Victoria Embankment Gardens, Main Garden 51°30′32″N 0°07′16″W	1884	John Steell	—N/a	Statue	Grade II	Unveiled 26 July 1884 by Lord Rosebery. A variation on Steell's 1880 statue of Burns in Central Park, New York; other versions are in Dundee (erected 1880) and Dunedin, New Zealand (erected 1887).
More images	Memorial to Henry Fawcett	Victoria Embankment Gardens, Main Garden 51°30′33″N 0°07′14″W	1886	Mary Grant and George Frampton	Basil Champneys	Drinking fountain with plaque	Grade II	Unveiled 27 July 1886. Grant produced the portrait relief and Frampton, then at an early stage in his career, provided the ornamental sculpture. An erroneous inscription reads MARY GRANT SC/ 1896; this was added in 1897.
More images	Statue of Sir Henry Bartle Frere, 1st Baronet	Victoria Embankment Gardens, Whitehall Garden 51°30′18″N 0°07′25″W	1887	Thomas Brock	—N/a	Statue	Grade II	Unveiled 5 June 1888 by the Prince of Wales (the future Edward VII). Frere is represented in privy counsellor's uniform, with the robe and collar of a Knight Grand Commander of the Star of India and the insignia of the Order of the Bath.
More images	Statue of Charles George Gordon	Victoria Embankment Gardens, Ministry of Defence section 51°30′16″N 0°07′26″W	1888	William Hamo Thornycroft	Alfred Waterhouse	Statue	Grade II	Unveiled 16 October 1888 in Trafalgar Square. The pedestal was inspired by that of Le Sueur's Charles I at the southern end of the square. Thornycroft's work was removed from its original location in 1943 for the temporary display of a Lancaster bomber and re-erected on this site in 1953. A cast of 1889 is in Melbourne.
More images	Statue of William Edward Forster	Victoria Embankment Gardens, Main Garden 51°30′41″N 0°06′44″W	1889	Henry Richard Hope-Pinker	—N/a	Statue	Grade II	Unveiled 1 August 1890. Erected outside the (now demolished) London School Board offices. School boards in England and Wales had been created under "Forster's Education Act" of 1870.
More images	Memorial to Joseph Bazalgette	Near Embankment Pier, facing Northumberland Avenue 51°30′23″N 0°07′20″W	1901	George Blackall Simonds	—N/a	Plaque with bust	Grade II	Unveiled 6 November 1901. Inscribed FLVMINI VINCVLA POSVIT ("he put the river in chains"), referring to Bazalgette's construction of London's sewers, which also resulted in the creation of the Embankment.
More images	Memorial to Arthur Sullivan	Victoria Embankment Gardens, Main Garden 51°30′33″N 0°07′13″W	1902	William Goscombe John	—N/a	Bust on pedestal with other sculpture	Grade II	Unveiled 10 July 1903 by Princess Louise. Inscribed with a quotation from Gilbert and Sullivan's comic opera The Yeomen of the Guard (1888), IS LIFE A BOON?/ IF SO, IT MUST BEFALL/ THAT DEATH, WHENE'ER HE CALL/ MUST CALL TOO SOON.
More images	Memorial to Walter Besant	Near Savoy Place 51°30′34″N 0°07′07″W	1902	George Frampton	—N/a	Plaque	—N/a	Erected 1904. A cast of an identical monument in the crypt of St Paul's Cathedral, unveiled in 1903.
	Gates	Norman Shaw Buildings, Derby Gate 51°30′07″N 0°07′27″W	1904 (erected)	Reginald Blomfield (designer of gates)	Richard Norman Shaw	Gates	Grade II*	These ornate wrought-iron gates were acquired by Shaw after he saw them displayed in an exhibition of Arts and Crafts; they were installed here during the construction of his second building for the New Scotland Yard, now known as the Norman Shaw South Building.
More images	Statue of Sir Wilfrid Lawson, 2nd Baronet, of Brayton	Victoria Embankment Gardens, Main Garden 51°30′31″N 0°07′18″W	1909	David McGill	—N/a	Statue	Grade II	Unveiled 20 July 1909 by H. H. Asquith. The pedestal was originally decorated with bronze statuettes representing Temperance, Charity, Fortitude and Peace; these were stolen in 1979.
More images	Memorial to W. T. Stead	Temple Pier 51°30′39″N 0°06′45″W	1913	George Frampton	—N/a	Plaque	Grade II	Unveiled 5 July 1920. Portrait relief with two small figures of Fortitude and Sympathy. A replica was unveiled in Central Park, New York, in 1921.
	Memorial to Richard Norman Shaw	Norman Shaw North Building 51°30′08″N 0°07′27″W	1914	William Hamo Thornycroft	William Lethaby	Plaque	Grade I (building)	Unveiled 13 July 1914. Lethaby commended Thornycroft on his posthumous likeness of Shaw: "You must have remembered much, the curled over lip and the serious smiling, saucy look are so alike..." The building is often regarded as Shaw's masterpiece.
More images	Memorial to W. S. Gilbert	Near Embankment Pier 51°30′26″N 0°07′18″W	1914	George Frampton	—N/a	Plaque	Grade II	Unveiled 31 August 1915. Portrait relief with figures of Tragedy and Comedy; the latter contemplates a doll dressed as the Mikado. Anthony Hope, who was on the memorial committee, took credit for the epitaph HIS FOE WAS FOLLY/ AND HIS WEAPON WIT, though the exact phrasing was not his.
More images	Anglo-Belgian Memorial	Victoria Embankment, facing Cleopatra's Needle 51°30′31″N 0°07′15″W	1920	Victor Rousseau with a Mr Francis	Reginald Blomfield	Screen with sculptural group and reliefs	Grade II*	Unveiled 12 October 1920. A gift from Belgium to thank Britain for her assistance in the First World War. Rousseau modelled the central bronze group and Francis, a student at the Royal College of Art, was tasked with the initial carving of the stone elements, which was finished by Rousseau. A corresponding memorial is in Brussels.
More images	Imperial Camel Corps Memorial	Victoria Embankment Gardens, Main Garden 51°30′30″N 0°07′18″W	1920	Cecil Brown	—N/a	Statue on pedestal with reliefs	Grade II	Unveiled 22 July 1921. Major Cecil Brown, the sculptor, was himself a member of the Corps.
More images	Royal Air Force Memorial	Whitehall Steps 51°30′14″N 0°07′23″W	1923	William Reid Dick	Reginald Blomfield	Pylon with sculpture	Grade II*	Unveiled 13 July 1923 by the Prince of Wales (the future Edward VIII). A pylon of Portland stone surmounted by a gilded eagle, perched on a globe. Commemorates RAF personnel killed in both world wars.
More images	Memorial to Samuel Plimsoll	Victoria Embankment 51°30′19″N 0°07′24″W	1929	Ferdinand Victor Blundstone	—N/a	Bust on pedestal with other sculpture	Grade II	Unveiled 21 August 1929. The plinth is flanked by bronze figures of a sailor and Justice. The Plimsoll line is used as a motif on the railings on either side.
More images	Memorial to Herbert Eaton, 3rd Baron Cheylesmore	Victoria Embankment Gardens, Main Garden 51°30′32″N 0°07′15″W	1930	—N/a	Edwin Lutyens	Screen	Grade II	Unveiled 17 July 1930. Reginald Blomfield, the architect of the Anglo-Belgian Memorial, objected to Lutyens's work being "plastered onto the back" of his own.
More images	King's Reach Memorial	Temple Pier 51°30′39″N 0°06′42″W	1936	Charles Doman	Edwin Cooper	Stele with plaque and sculpture	—N/a	Unveiled 20 January 1936. Commemorates the naming of this stretch of the river after George V.
More images	Statue of Hugh Trenchard, 1st Viscount Trenchard	Victoria Embankment Gardens, Ministry of Defence section 51°30′13″N 0°07′26″W	1961	William McMillan	Albert Richardson	Statue	Grade II	Unveiled 19 July 1961 by Harold Macmillan. Richardson was an old friend of Trenchard's and offered to design the pedestal free of charge.
More images	Statue of Charles Portal, 1st Viscount Portal of Hungerford	Victoria Embankment Gardens, Ministry of Defence section 51°30′15″N 0°07′25″W	1975	Oscar Nemon	—N/a	Statue	—N/a	Unveiled 21 May 1975 by Harold Macmillan. The statue is set on a triangular slate pedestal, partly intended to evoke the shape of an aerofoil. Portal gazes upwards in the direction of the RAF Memorial.
	Murals	Embankment tube station, all platforms	1985	Robyn Denny	Arup Associates	Murals	—N/a	This scheme won a Brunel Award for outstanding visual design in 1989.
	Savoy Hotel Centenary Memorial Richard D'Oyly Carte and other chairmen and managing directors of the Savoy Hotel up to 1989	Victoria Embankment Gardens, Main Garden 51°30′34″N 0°07′12″W	1989	Christopher Daniel	Hugh Casson	Armillary sphere and cistern	—N/a	Inaugurated 30 March 1989. The inscriptions on the armilla include the hotel's motto ('FOR EXCELLENCE WE STRIVE') and lines from Gilbert and Sullivan's Savoy opera, Ruddigore (1887): EVERY SEASON HAS ITS CHEER'/ 'LIFE IS LOVELY ALL THE YEAR'.
More images	Statue of Michael Faraday	Savoy Place 51°30′36″N 0°07′08″W	1989	John Henry Foley and Thomas Brock	—N/a	Statue	—N/a	Unveiled 1 November 1989. Cast of an 1874 marble sculpture in the Royal Institution, completed by Brock after Foley's death. The original gilding has worn away entirely.
More images	Memorial to the Chindits	Victoria Embankment Gardens, Whitehall Garden 51°30′12″N 0°07′26″W	1990	Frank Forster	David Price	Statue	Grade II	Unveiled 16 October 1990. Crowned with a bronze Chinthe or Burmese temple guardian, the Chindits' namesake. Medallions to the front and rear reproduce the force's badge and the portrait of their founder Orde Wingate.
More images	Lady Henry Somerset Memorial	Victoria Embankment Gardens, Main Garden 51°30′40″N 0°06′45″W	1991	Philomena Davidson Davis after George Edward Wade	—N/a	Drinking fountain with statue	Grade II	Unveiled 29 May 1897. Wade's original sculpture for the temperance campaigner's memorial was stolen in 1971; it was replaced by Davis's replica only in 1991.
More images	Fleet Air Arm Memorial (Daedalus) Royal Naval Air Service and Fleet Air Arm	Victoria Embankment Gardens, Ministry of Defence section 51°30′15″N 0°07′26″W	2000	James Butler	Trehearne and Norman	Statue	—N/a	Unveiled 1 June 2000 by the Prince of Wales (the future Charles III). The figure of Daedalus as a modern pilot reflects on his fallen comrades. He stands atop a column which rises out of a plinth reminiscent of the prow of a ship.
More images	Battle of Britain Monument	Victoria Embankment, near Richmond Terrace 51°30′11″N 0°07′24″W	2005	Paul Day	Tony Dyson	Memorial with sculpture	—N/a	Unveiled 18 September 2005 by the Prince of Wales (the future Charles III). Adapted from a Victorian granite plinth which originally housed a ventilator for the Underground.
More images	Korean War Memorial	Victoria Embankment Gardens, Whitehall Garden 51.5036°N 0.1239°W	2014	Philip Jackson	—N/a	Memorial with statue	—N/a	Unveiled 3 December 2014. A statue of a British soldier stands in front of a Portland stone obelisk on a base of Welsh slate. The memorial is a gift of the Republic of Korea.
More images	Iraq and Afghanistan Memorial	Victoria Embankment Gardens, Whitehall Garden 51.5034°N 0.1243°W	2017	Paul Day	—N/a	Memorial with sculpture	—N/a	Unveiled 9 March 2017 by Elizabeth II.
	Untitled (Sandbags)	Tyburn Quay	2025	Richard Wentworth	Hawkins\Brown	Sculptures	—N/a	Commissioned for the Tideway scheme, the bronze casts of sandbags allude to earlier makeshift flood defences.

== Bibliography ==
- Kershman, Andrew (2013). London's Monuments. London: Metro Publications. ISBN 978-1-902910-43-7.
- Matthews, Peter (2018). London's Statues and Monuments. Oxford: Shire Publications. ISBN 978-1-78442-256-1.
- Ward-Jackson, Philip (2003). Public Sculpture of the City of London. Public Sculpture of Britain. Vol. 7. Liverpool: Liverpool University Press. ISBN 0-85323-977-0.
- ——— (2011). Public Sculpture of Historic Westminster: Volume 1. Public Sculpture of Britain. Vol. 14. Liverpool: Liverpool University Press. ISBN 978-1-84631-691-3.
