= King's Reach =

Stretch of the River Thames in London

Coordinates: 51.509698°N 0.108846°W

View of King's Reach from the South Bank in 2014

King's Reach is the name given to the reach of the River Thames from Westminster Bridge in the west to London Bridge in the east.

== History ==
Albert Gravely Linney, editor of the Port of London Authority Monthly, first put forward the idea of the naming the stretch of the river. In early June 1935, Charles Ritchie, 2nd Baron Ritchie of Dundee, chairman of the Authority officially announced the renaming in a gathering aboard the paddle steamer Isle of Arran. Intending to commemorate the silver jubilee of King George V, the stretch of the Thames was to be named King's Reach. The renaming was approved by the London County Council on the 22nd of October the same year.

The accompanying King's Reach Memorial was erected on the Victoria Embankment the same year within the older Temple Stairs Arch. The reach also gave its name to the King's Reach Tower now the Southbank Tower, renamed following its conversion into a residential building in 2011.

== See also ==
- Pool of London
- Gallions Reach
