= John Ritchie, 3rd Baron Ritchie of Dundee =

English stockbroker

John Kenneth Ritchie, 3rd Baron Ritchie of Dundee, PC (22 September 1902 – 20 October 1975) was a British stockbroker. He was the chairman of the Stock Exchange from 1959 to 1965.

== Biography ==
Born at 52 Earls Court Square, London, Ritchie was the second son of Charles Ritchie, 2nd Baron Ritchie of Dundee, chairman of the Port of London Authority, and of Sarah Ruth, née Jennings (died 1950), fourth daughter of L. J. Jennings, MP.

Ritchie was educated at Royal Naval College, Osborne, Winchester College, and Magdalen College, Oxford, but left without taking a degree. He joined the London stockbroking firm of Richardson and Glover in 1923, becoming a partner in 1926. Following in the steps of his father, he was Mayor of Winchelsea in 1934. As a younger son he had no expectation of succeeding to the family title, but he became his father's heir on the death of his elder brother in 1927. He succeeded his father to the barony in 1948.

During the Second World War, he served in the King's Royal Rifle Corps from 1940 to 1945, achieving the rank of captain. After the war, in 1946 he became senior partner of Richardson and Glover, which eventually merged with another firm to become Norris, Oakely, Richardson, and Glover in 1966.

In 1947, Ritchie was elected to the council of the Stock Exchange. After serving on several key committees, he was elected as one of the two deputy chairmen in 1954. He was elected unopposed as chairman of Stock Exchange in 1959 in succession to Sir John Braithwaite. As chairman, Ritchie set out to modernize the Stock Exchange: he rebuilt the trading floor, began work on the unification of British and Irish stock exchanges, and raised the standards of Stock Exchange members and firms. He also advocated for the reform of the stock transfer system and opposed capital gains tax.

Ritchie retired from the Stock Exchange chairmanship in 1965 for medical reasons, but continued on the council as deputy chairman supernumerary and a member of the committees responsible for the rebuilding and the federated stock exchanges. He was sworn of the Privy Council in recognition for his services. He died in 1975 and the title passed to his younger brother, the fourth Baron.

== Arms ==
Coat of arms of John Ritchie, 3rd Baron Ritchie of Dundee
Crest Out of an Eastern Crown Or a Unicorn's Head Argent armed of the first and charged on the neck with an Anchor Sable Escutcheon Argent an Anchor Sable on a Chief of the last three Lions' Heads erased of the first Supporters On either side an Unicorn Gules gorged with an Eastern Crown Or the dexter charged on the shoulder with a Purse Or and the sinister with a Balance also Or Motto Virtute Acquiritur Honos (Honour is acquired by virtue)

Peerage of the United Kingdom
Preceded by Charles Ritchie	Baron Ritchie of Dundee; 1948–1975	Succeeded by Colin Ritchie
