= Statue of John Stuart Mill =

Bronze statue in London

Coordinates: 51.5113°N 0.1123°W

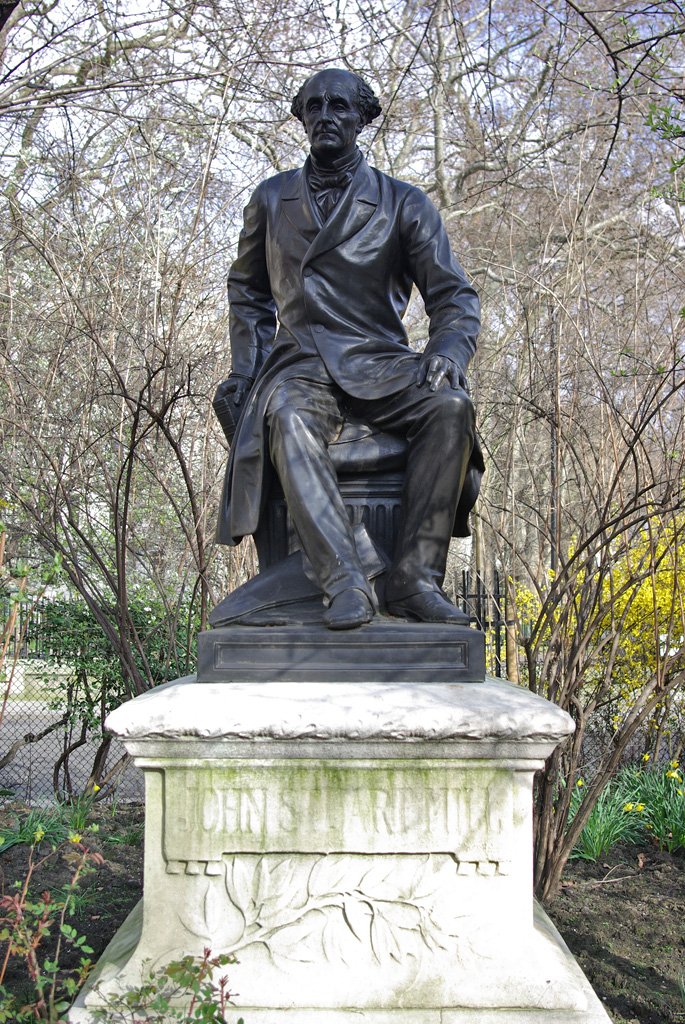
- Artist: Thomas Woolner
- Completion date: 1878
- Subject: John Stuart Mill
- Location: London

Listed Building – Grade II
- Official name: Statue of John Stuart Mill
- Designated: 24 February 1958
- Reference no.: 1357352

The statue of John Stuart Mill is a Grade II listed statue of the political philosopher John Stuart Mill on the Victoria Embankment in London. It sits in the Temple Gardens.

The statue was designed and sculpted by Thomas Woolner, a member of the Pre-Raphaelite Brotherhood, between 1876 and 1879. The statue consists of a bronze representation of Mill, said to resemble him during his time as an MP, upon a Portland stone pedestal. It was unveiled by Mill's student Henry Fawcett, who himself has a memorial on the Victoria Embankment.
