= King's Reach Memorial =

Memorial in London, England

Coordinates: 51.510890°N 0.111785°W

The King's Reach Memorial as visible from the Thames side

The King's Reach Memorial is a memorial on the Victoria Embankment in London to mark the naming of the stretch of the river from Westminster Bridge to London Bridge for King George V.

== History and description ==
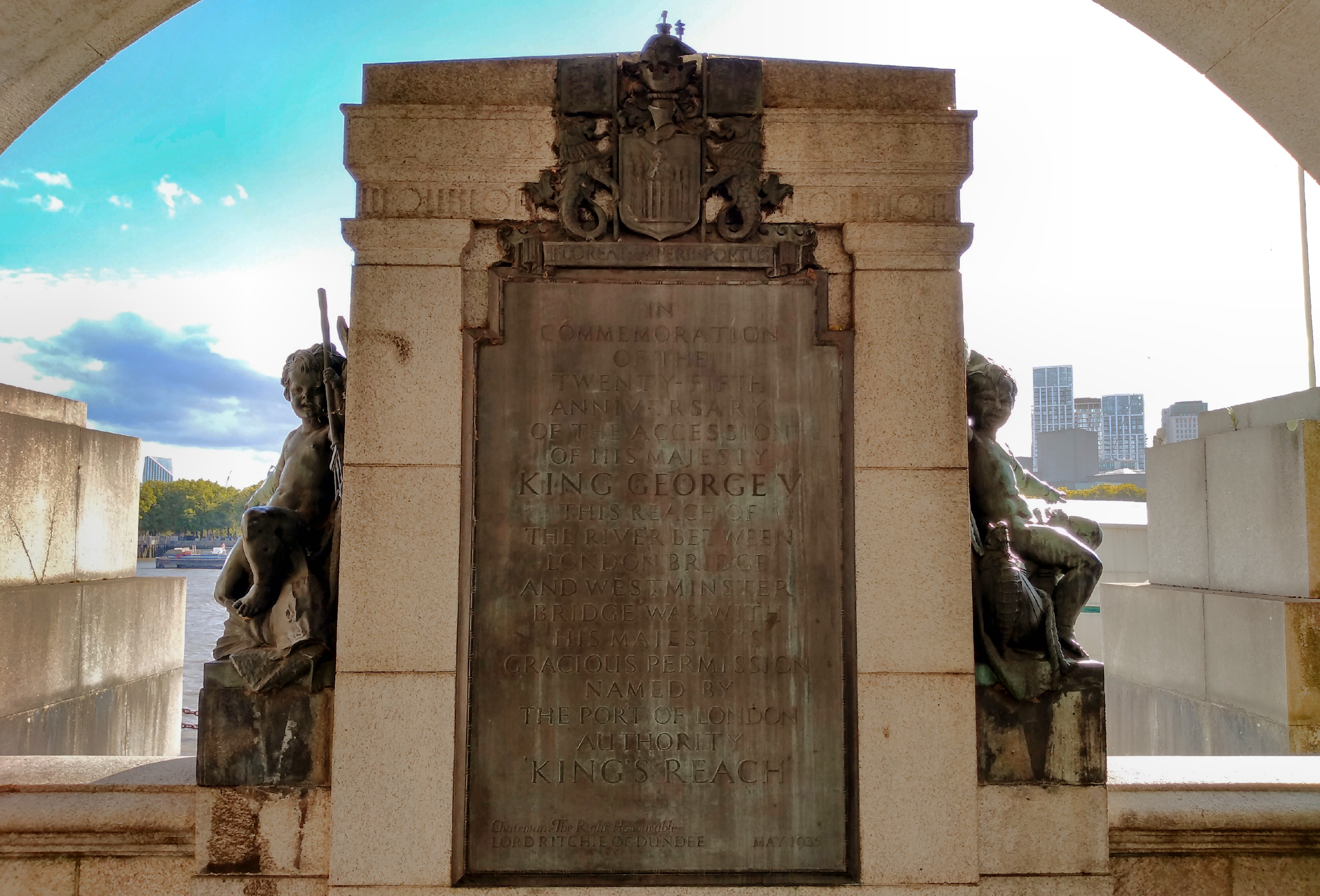
The plaque facing the Embankment

Albert Gravely Linney, editor of the Port of London Authority Monthly, first put forward the idea of the naming the stretch of the river which was first officially announced by Charles Ritchie, 2nd Baron Ritchie of Dundee, chairman of the Authority in June 1935. Intending to commemorate the silver jubilee of King George V, the stretch of the Thames was to be named King's Reach. The renaming was approved by the London County Council on the 22nd of October the same year.

The site of the memorial was chosen in November. Underneath an older arch on the Victoria Embankment from 1868. Two smaller blocks flank the arch at a distance of 50 metres. From the Embankment, that on the right held the W. T. Stead memorial, and that on the left the National Submarine War Memorial. Edwin Cooper and Charles Doman were chosen to produce the work, Cooper designing the block and plaques and Doman providing the bronze putti. The memorial was designed to so it can be read from both the river and the Embankment itself.

Charles Ritchie, organising the unveiling hoped for it to be carried out by George V himself, but the king died in January 1936. Instead Lady Ritchie took on the role. On the 15th of July, the ceremony took place with Lady Ritchie and observors arriving on the steamboat Katherine from Tower Bridge. Thomas Wiles at the ceremony stated that it was the last stretch of the river to be given a name, a claim which was reflected in the press.
