= Southbank Tower =

High-rise building on Upper Ground, Southwark, London

Coordinates: 51°30′26.7″N 00°6′27.5″W

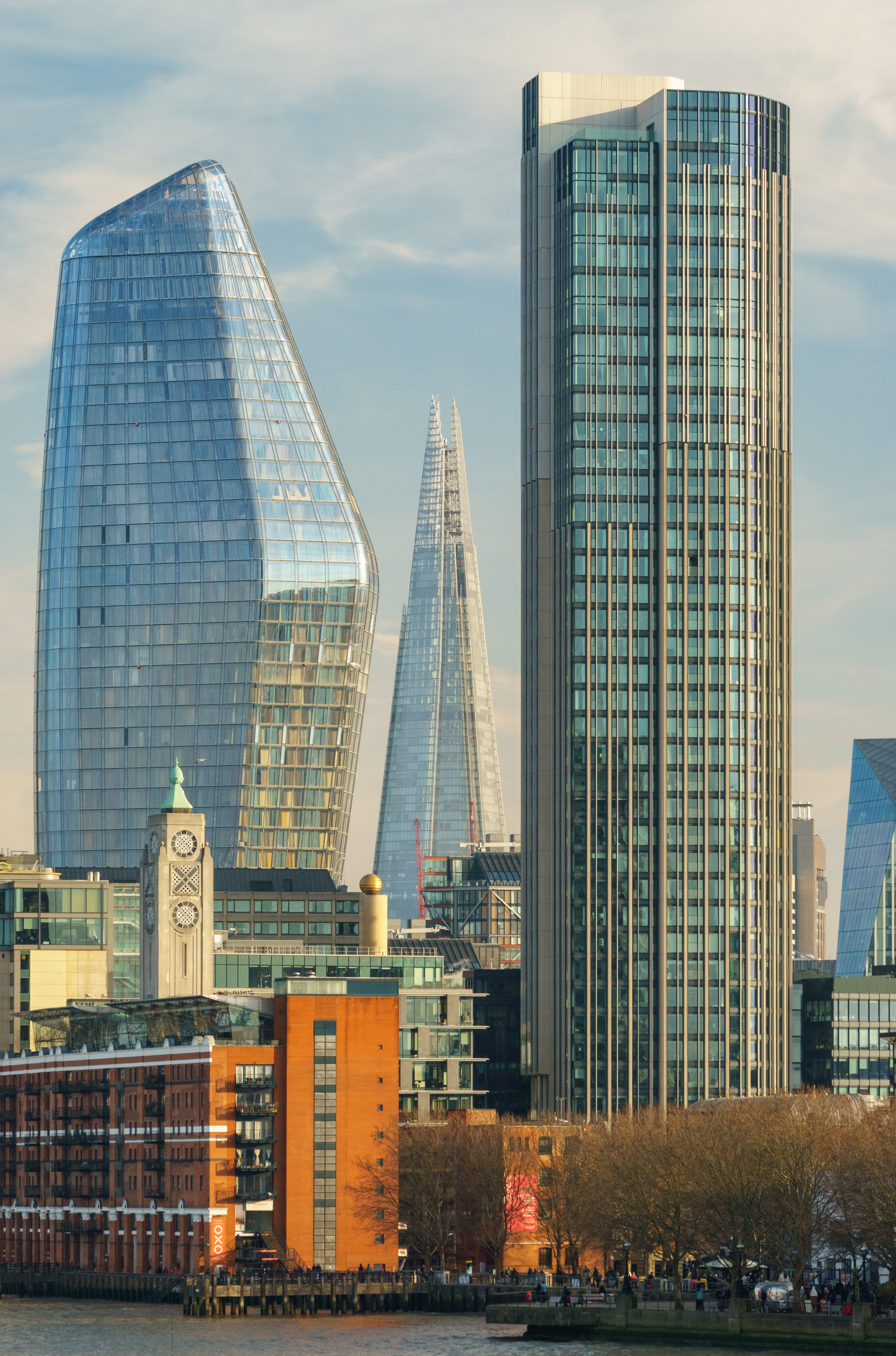
- One Blackfriars, The Shard, and South Bank Tower (right) from Waterloo Bridge, January 2019
- Former names: King's Reach Tower, South Bank Tower

General information
- Status: Completed
- Type: Mixed use
- Location: London, SE1; United Kingdom
- Completed: 2015 (original tower constructed 1972)

Height
- Roof: 151 metres (495 ft) (original tower 111 metres (364 ft))

Technical details
- Floor count: 41 (original tower: 31)
- Floor area: 191 apartments, 370,000 sq.ft Office, 72,000 sq.ft retail

Design and construction
- Architect: Kohn Pedersen Fox
- Developer: CIT
- Structural engineer: AKT II
- Main contractor: Mace

Website
- http://www.southbanktower.com

Southbank Tower (formerly South Bank Tower, and the King's Reach Tower until 2013) is a high-rise building on Upper Ground, Southwark, London. It was originally a thirty-storey structure 111 metres (364 ft) high and was completed in 1972, designed by the architect Richard Seifert and built by John Laing. In recent years, the tower has undergone extensive redevelopment and a height increase.

The tower is similar in design to Tower 42, which was designed by the same architect.

== Previous tenants ==
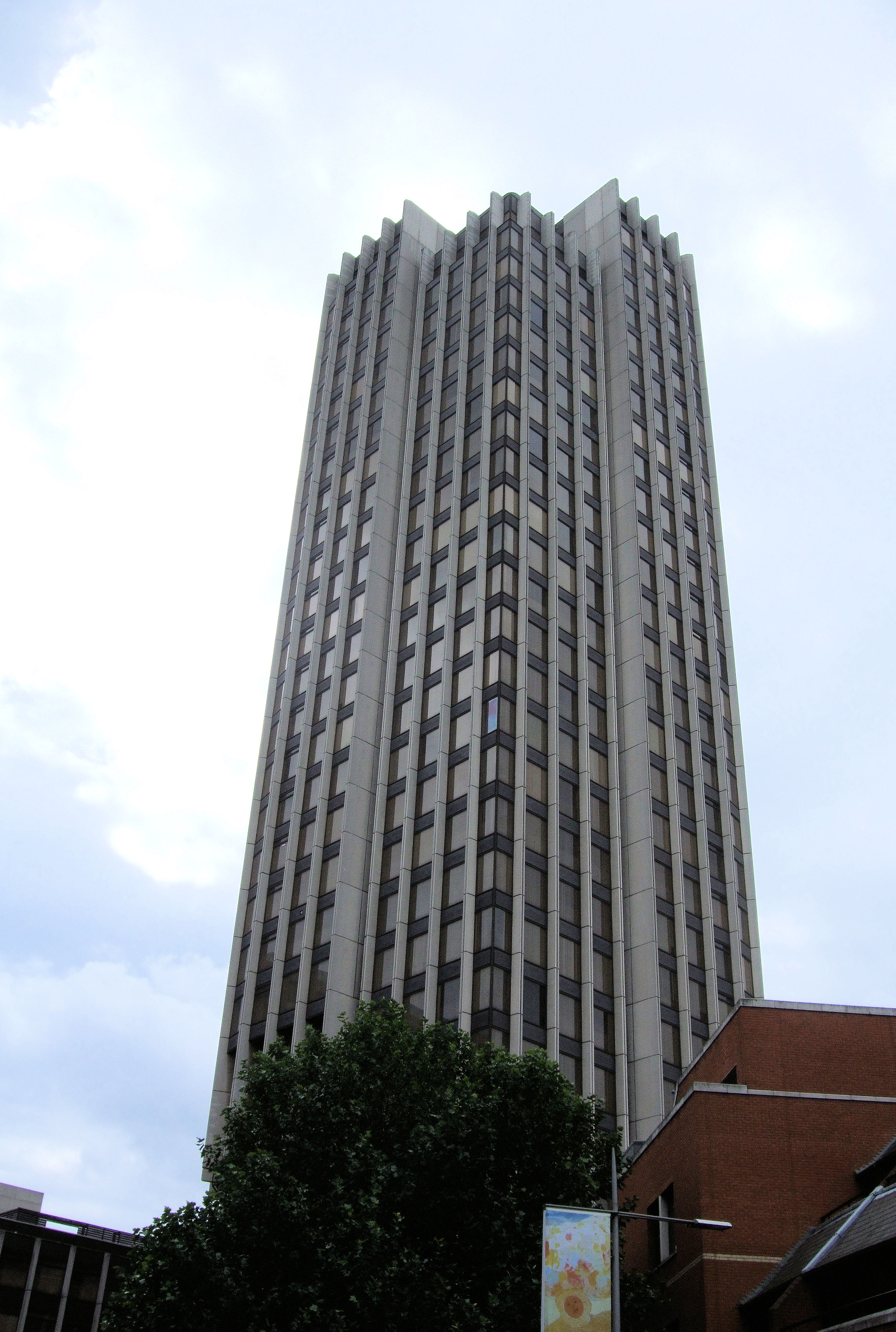
King's Reach Tower in 2009

The tower was the headquarters of IPC Media, one of the biggest publishing companies in Europe. In the late 1970s, the tower became part of the mythos surrounding the British comic 2000 AD, published by IPC, and the building was depicted as a disguised spaceship, and home to the 'Nerve Centre' of its alien editor, Tharg. IPC moved to the Blue Fin Building in nearby Bankside in 2007.

== Redevelopment ==
In February 2005 the then owners Capital & Counties Properties applied for planning permission with a design by Make Architects to remodel the tower by extending it to 34 floors along with replacement buildings for the T-shaped building at its base. Permission was granted in July 2005. However no redevelopment took place.

Capital and Counties sold the property to Simon Halabi's Buckingham Securities in 2006 for a reported £80m.

As part of their joint venture, CIT and Jadwa Investment purchased the property for £60m in 2010. In July 2011 CIT was awarded planning permission to convert the building to residential use along with additional mixed uses. The redevelopment of the building commenced in January 2013. Six new floors were originally planned to be added to the tower, increasing its height to around 128.4 metres (421 ft). The new tower was to house 173 apartments, with retail units to be built around the base and the existing podium building increased in height and transformed into new office space.

In mid 2013, CIT requested permission to increase the tower's height by a further 5 floors (bringing the total to 11) which would bring the tower to 155 metres (509 ft). 18 additional apartments would be made available with this increase. The plans were approved by Southwark councillors on 16 July 2013.

In September 2012 the joint venture secured £250m of funding from a consortium of Middle Eastern financial institutions.

In 2015 the building was purchased by Hermes Central London Limited Partnership who commissioned TPBennett llp to carry out a CAT A fit out design for all of the commercial space, to redesign the retail frontages not already completed and to remodel the entrance to the central street and both of the office entrances. These works also incorporated a new 9 storey feature staircase suspended from the side of the tower building. The additional works were completed in 2017.

== See also ==
- Tall buildings in London
