= Richard Norman Shaw Memorial =

Memorial in London, England

Coordinates: 51.502251°N 0.124167°W

Richard Norman Shaw
- Artists: William Lethaby and Hamo Thornycroft
- Completion date: 1914
- Subject: Richard Norman Shaw
- Location: London, England

The Richard Norman Shaw Memorial is a bronze memorial plaque to architect Richard Norman Shaw on the Norman Shaw Buildings in London.

== History and description ==
The memorial was promoted by Robert Windsor-Clive the Earl of Plymouth who had worked with Shaw on his design of the Regent Street Quadrant. W. H. Thornycroft was chosen as the sculptor for the memorial. A personal enthusiast of the works of Shaw, he believed Shaw to be the best architect since Wren and therefore considered St Paul's Cathedral the fitting place for the memorial, although this was rejected by the cathedral authorities.

William Lethaby designed the surround, and was pleased with Thornycroft's work. The plaque as unveiled on 13 July 1914 by Windsor-Clive with a number of prominent architects of the day present. It was placed under an upper balcony on the Norman Shaw Buildings which Shaw had designed, but its high placement was seen as out of the way and criticised as such in The Builder.
