= Statue of Wilfrid Lawson, London =

Statue by David McGill

Statue of Wilfrid Lawson
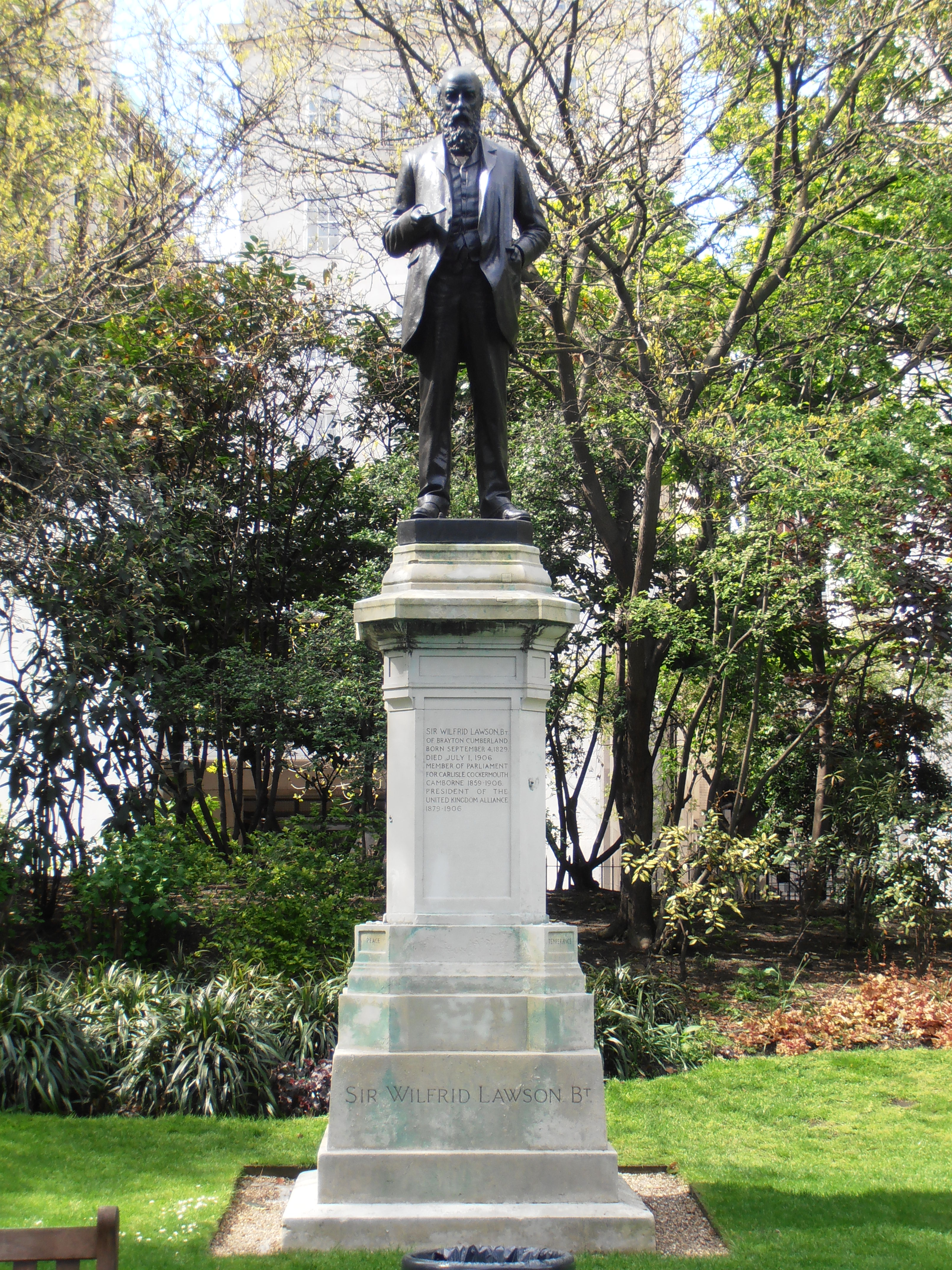
- The statue in 2012
- Location: 51°30′32″N 0°07′16″W

The statue of Sir Wilfrid Lawson (1829–1906) is an outdoor sculpture by David McGill, installed on 20 July 1909 in Victoria Embankment Gardens in London, United Kingdom. The monument's allegorical sculptures depicting Charity, Fortitude, Peace, and Temperance were stolen in 1979.
