= Hawkins\Brown =

Multinational architectural practice

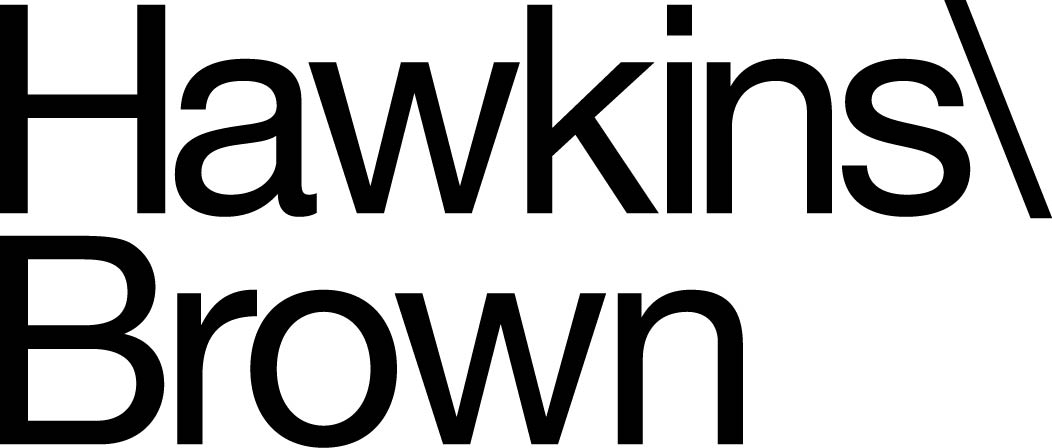
- Founded: 1988
- Founders: Roger Hawkins; Russell Brown
- Headquarters: United Kingdom, London
- Number of locations: London, Manchester, Edinburgh, Dublin, Toronto
- Services: Architecture, interior design and urban design
- Website: www.hawkinsbrown.com

Hawkins\Brown is a British architectural practice with studios in London, Manchester, Edinburgh, Dublin and Toronto. The practice has received recognition for projects across the UK, including shortlisting for the RIBA Stirling Prize for its work on Park Hill in Sheffield and for the RIBA National Awards for the Beecroft Building at the University of Oxford. It has also appeared twice at the Venice Biennale and has been named Architects' Journal Practice of the Year, and Employer of the Year.

== History ==
Roger Hawkins and Russell Brown founded Hawkins\Brown in 1988. In 2021 the practice adopted an employee-ownership model.

In recent years, Hawkins\Brown has won and been shortlisted for awards including the Architects' Journal (AJ) Practice of the Year and AJ Employer of the Year. It has appeared at the Venice Biennale twice and was shortlisted for the RIBA Stirling Prize for its work on Park Hill in Sheffield, Europe's largest listed building. In 2016 the practice received a 2 Star Accreditation with The Sunday Times 100 Best Companies to Work For. The Beecroft Building for the University of Oxford Department of Physics, opened in 2018, was shortlisted for the RIBA National Awards in 2019.

== Notable projects ==
Notable projects ordered by year of completion and type:

=== Infrastructure ===
- Tottenham Court Road Crossrail upgrade, London, UK (2017–2019)
- Bond Street Elizabeth line upgrade, London, UK (2020)
- Liverpool Street Elizabeth line upgrade, London, UK (2021)
- Victoria Embankment, Thames Tideway Tunnel public realm, London, UK (2025)
- Bazalgette Embankment, Blackfriars,
- Thames Tideway Tunnel public realm, London, UK (2025)
- Chelsea Embankment, Thames Tideway Tunnel public realm, London, UK (2025)

=== Education ===
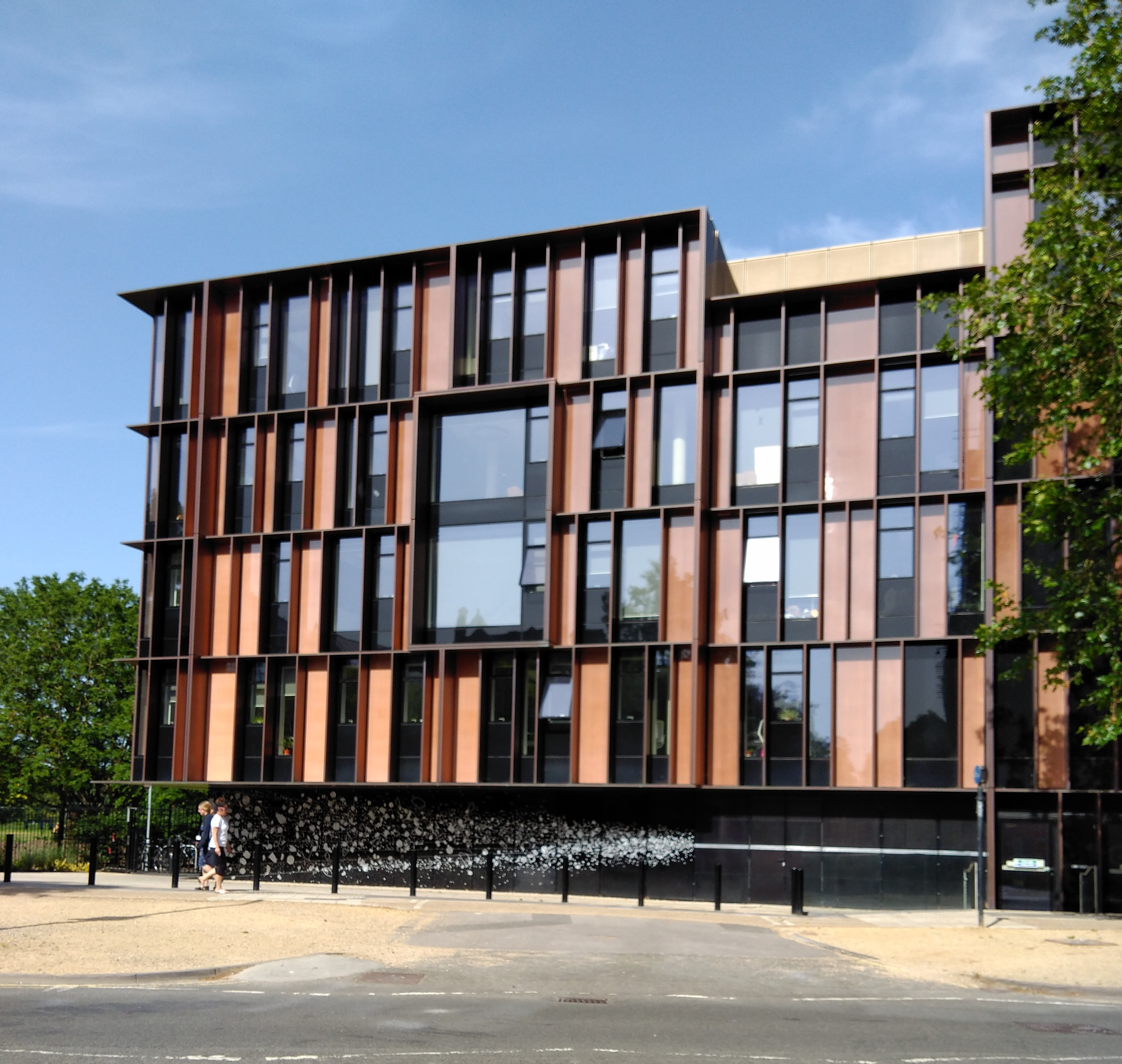
The Beecroft Building at the University of Oxford

- ARK Putney Academy, London, UK (2015)
- Bartlett School of Architecture, University College London, London, UK (2016)
- Beecroft Building, University of Oxford, Oxford, UK (2018)
- Royal College of Surgeons, London, UK (2021)
- Central Foundation Boys' School, London, UK (2023)
- Notting Hill and Ealing High School Junior School, London, UK (2024)
- St Paul's Prep School, London, UK (2026)

=== Civic, community and culture ===
- Hackney Town Hall, London, UK (2017)
- Waltham Forest Town Hall, London, UK (2020)

=== Other ===
- Park Hill, Sheffield, UK (2016)
- Here East, London, UK (2016)

== Publications ==
Hawkins\Brown has published a number of books and journals, including:

- The #GreatSchools Manifesto, Published by Hawkins\Brown and Architects' Journal
- AR Supplement Hawkins\Brown Social, Published by Architectural Review as a supplement to their June edition, 2013
- Ideas Exchange: The collaborative Studio of Hawkins\Brown, Published by Birkhäuser
- Salt Bridges: Changing Perceptions of Art/Architecture and Science, Published by Prestel Publishing
- &\Also: Hawkins\Brown, Published by Black Dog Publishing
