= Statue of Robert Raikes (Toronto) =

Sculpture in Toronto, Ontario, Canada

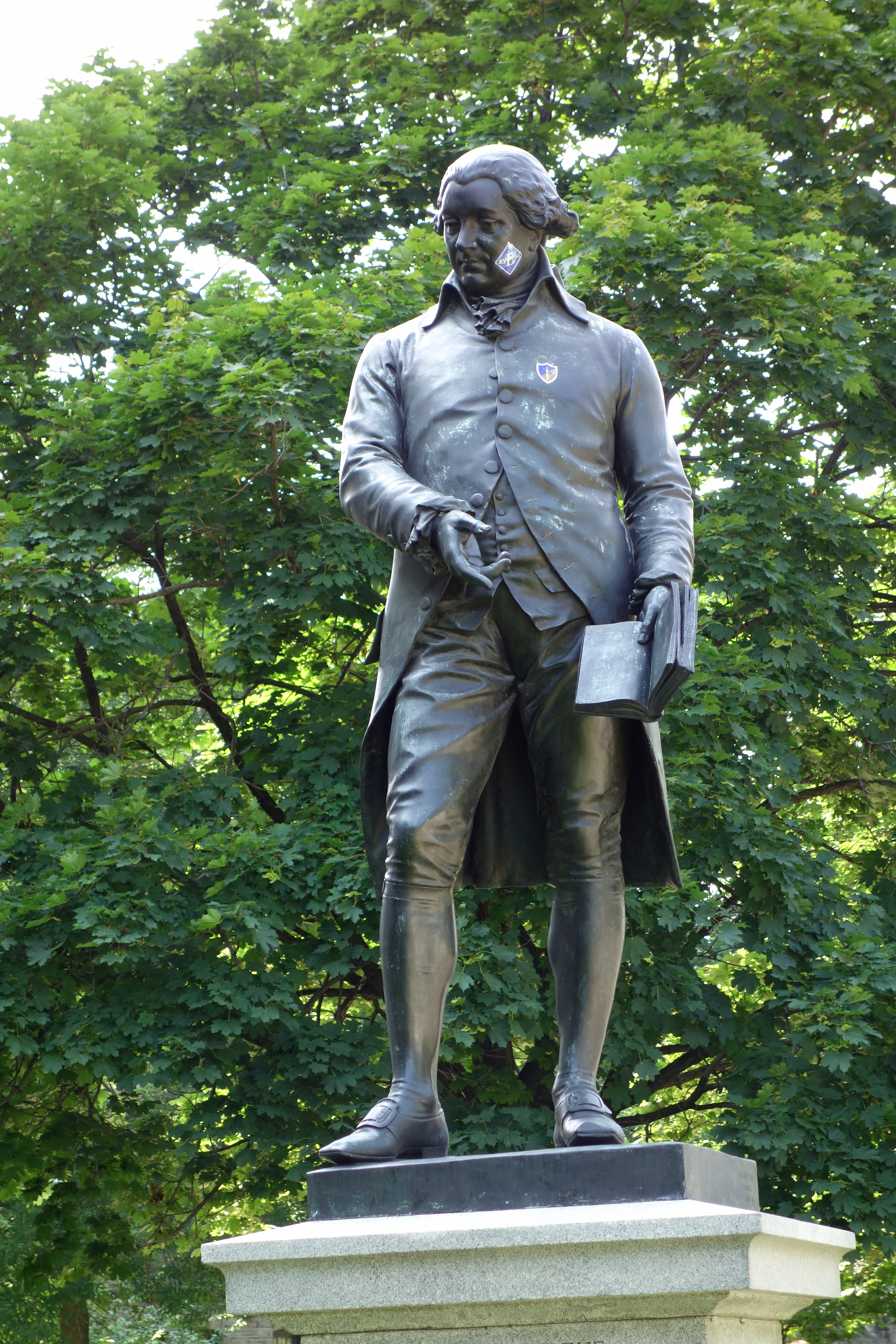
- The statue in 2013
- Subject: Robert Raikes
- Location: Toronto, Ontario, Canada; 43°39′39.3″N 79°23′31.4″W

A statue of Robert Raikes is installed in Toronto, Ontario, Canada.

== See also ==
- Statue of Robert Raikes, London
