= Bazalgette Embankment =

Embankment on the River Thames in London, England

Coordinates: 51°30′39″N 0°06′23″W

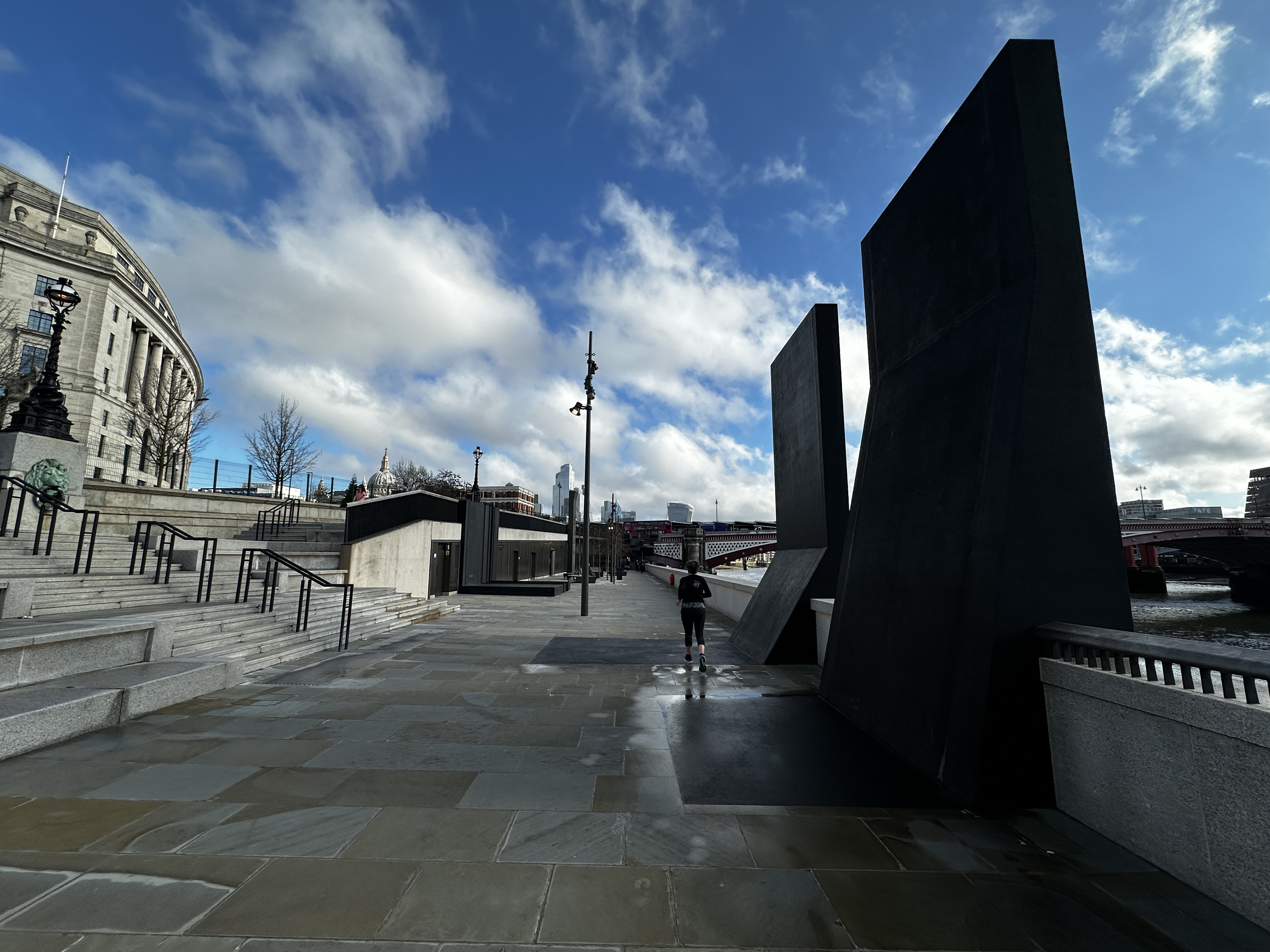
The view along the Bazalgette Embankment, toward Blackfriars Bridge

The Bazalgette Embankment is an embankment on the north bank of the River Thames in the City of London. It was created in 2025. Named for the engineer Joseph Bazalgette, it is the first embankment created in London in 150 years. Part of seven planned embankments created by the construction of the Thames Tideway Tunnel, it is 250 meters in length and was designed by the architects Fereday Pollard & Partners and Hawkins\Brown..

It is situated next to Victoria Embankment, to the west of Blackfriars Bridge. The embankment features five permanent concrete sculptures by Nathan Coley: Stage, Zig Zag, Waterwall, Twins, and Kicker. Coley described his sculptures as "... chunky, abstract, brooding objects that don't reference anyone or anything. They can be joyful, beautiful and brutal at the same time." The Bazalgette Embankment also features 71 trees and 3,000 plants.

The Bazalgette Embankment was visited by King Charles III on 7 May 2025. He arrived by the Thames Clipper water bus. The embankment opened to the public in January 2026.

== Gallery ==
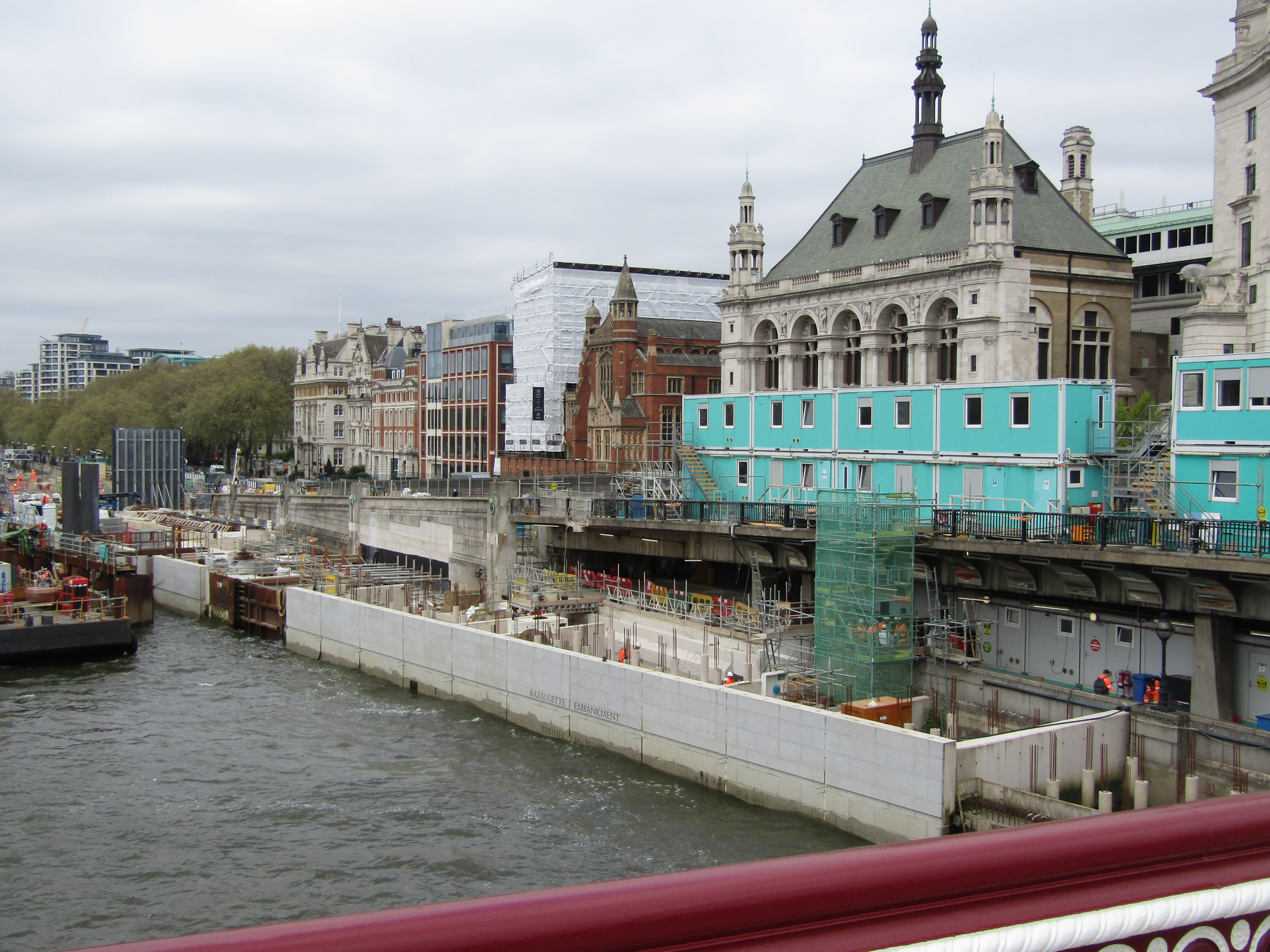
The embankment under construction in 2023

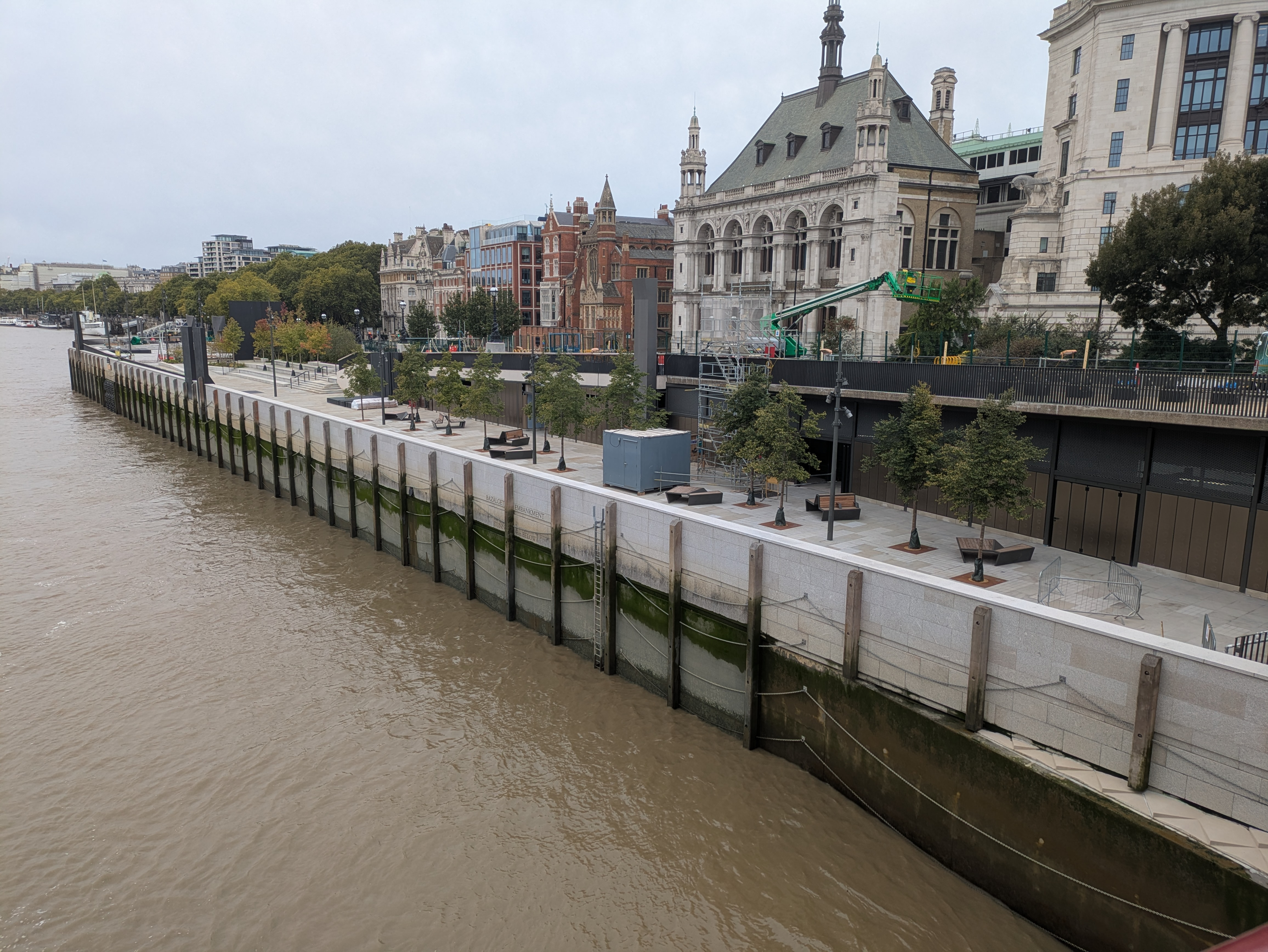
The embankment nearing completion in September 2025

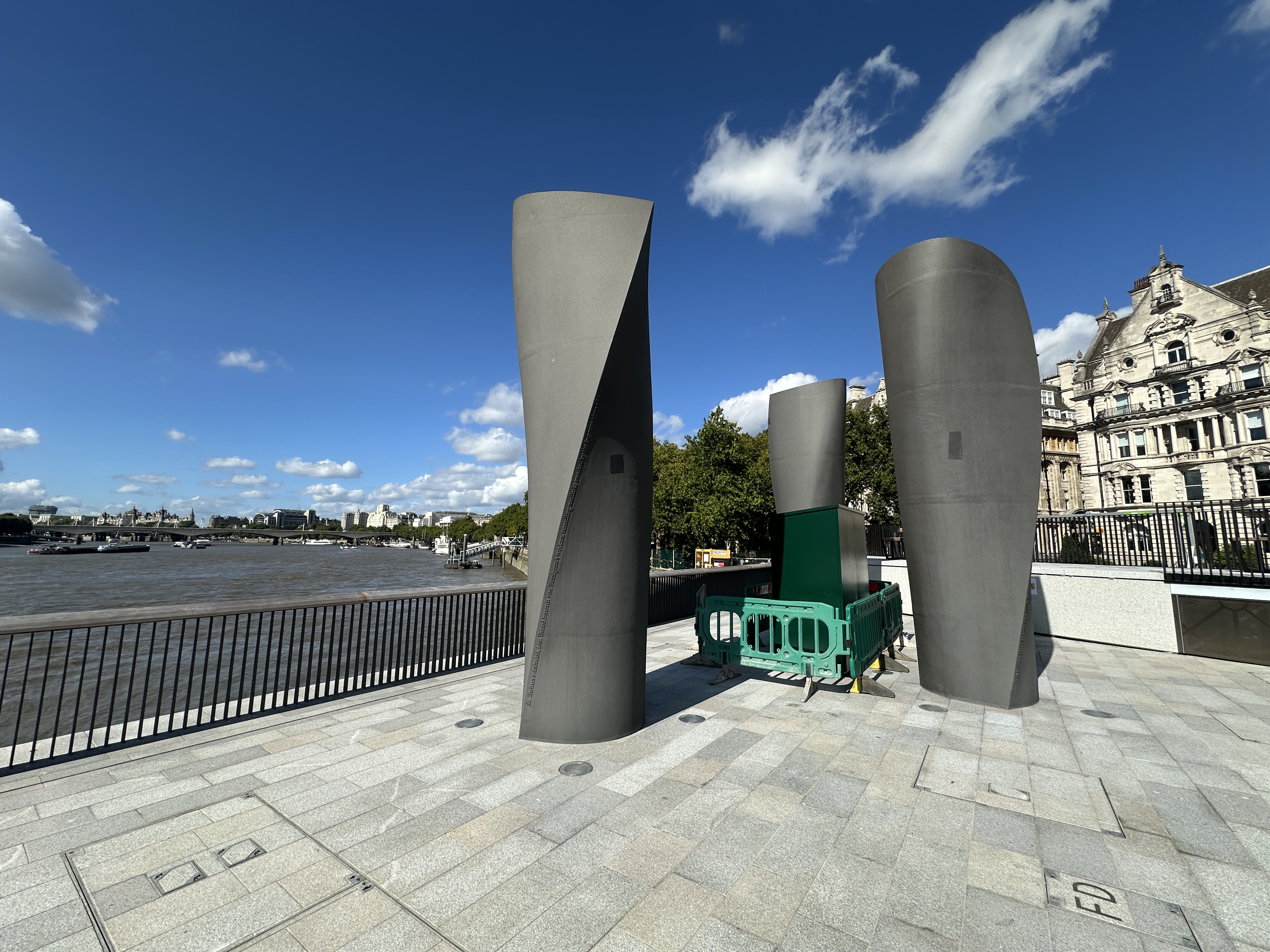
Ventilation shafts

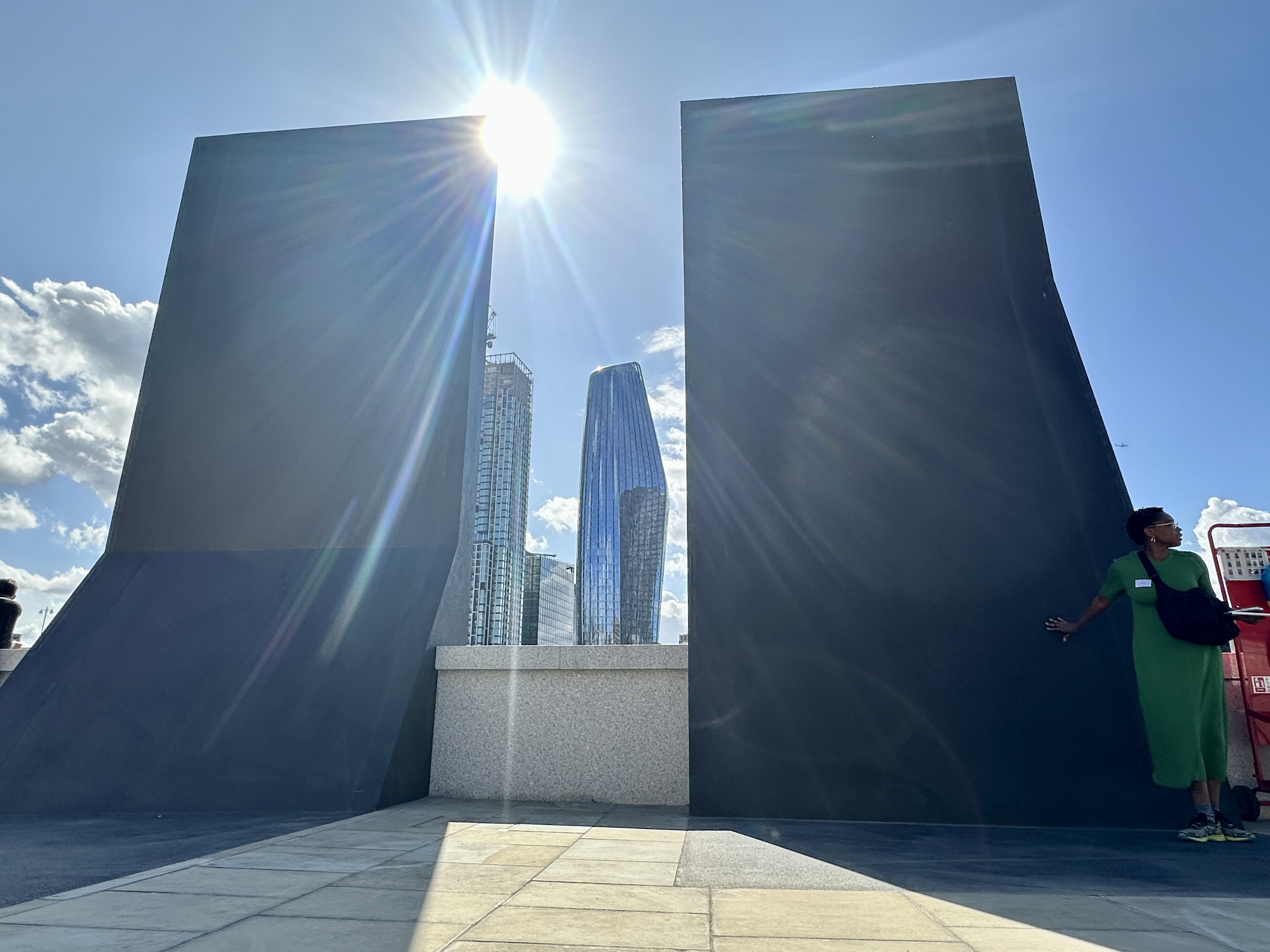
Monoliths

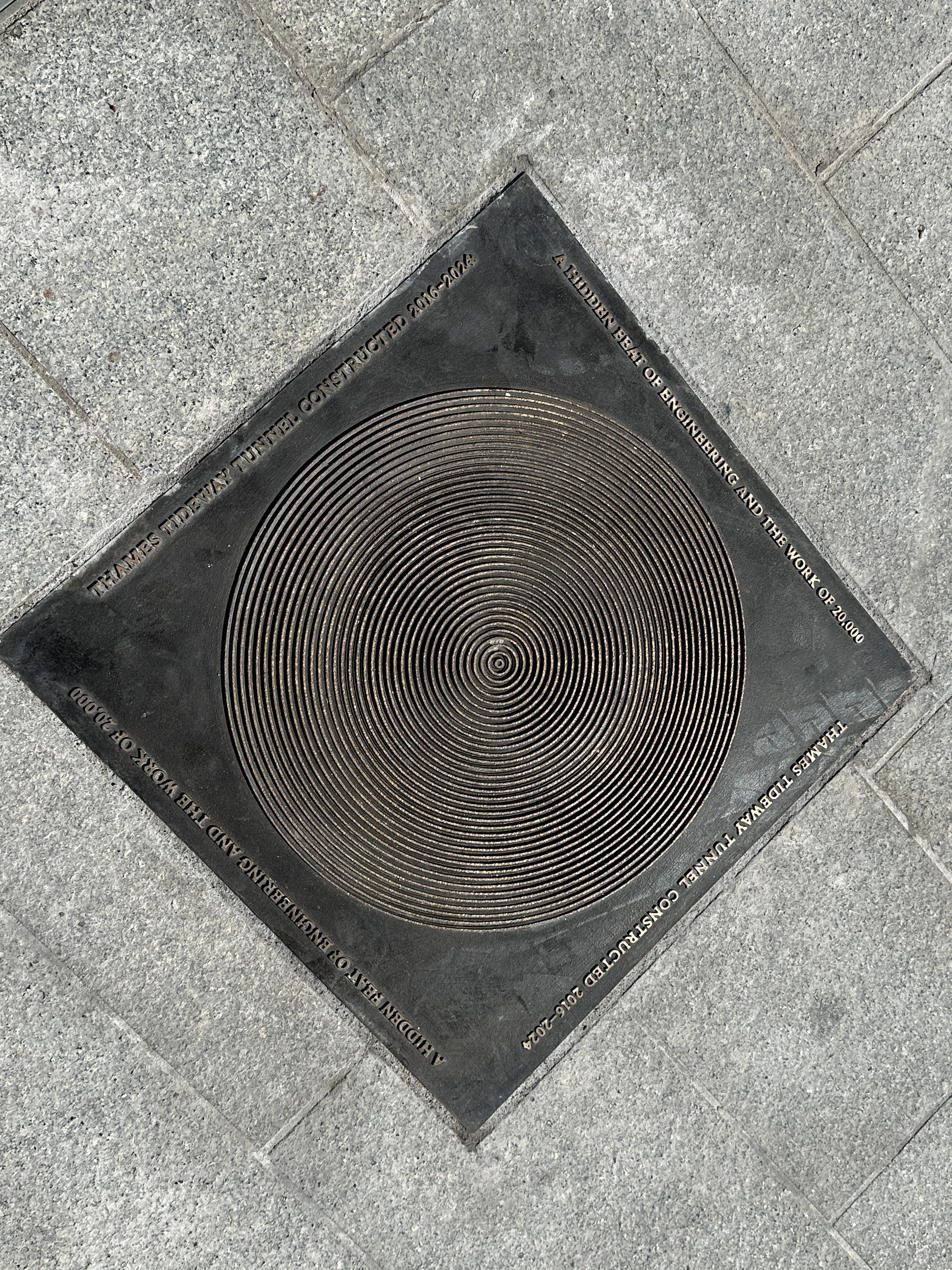
An inscribed manhole cover

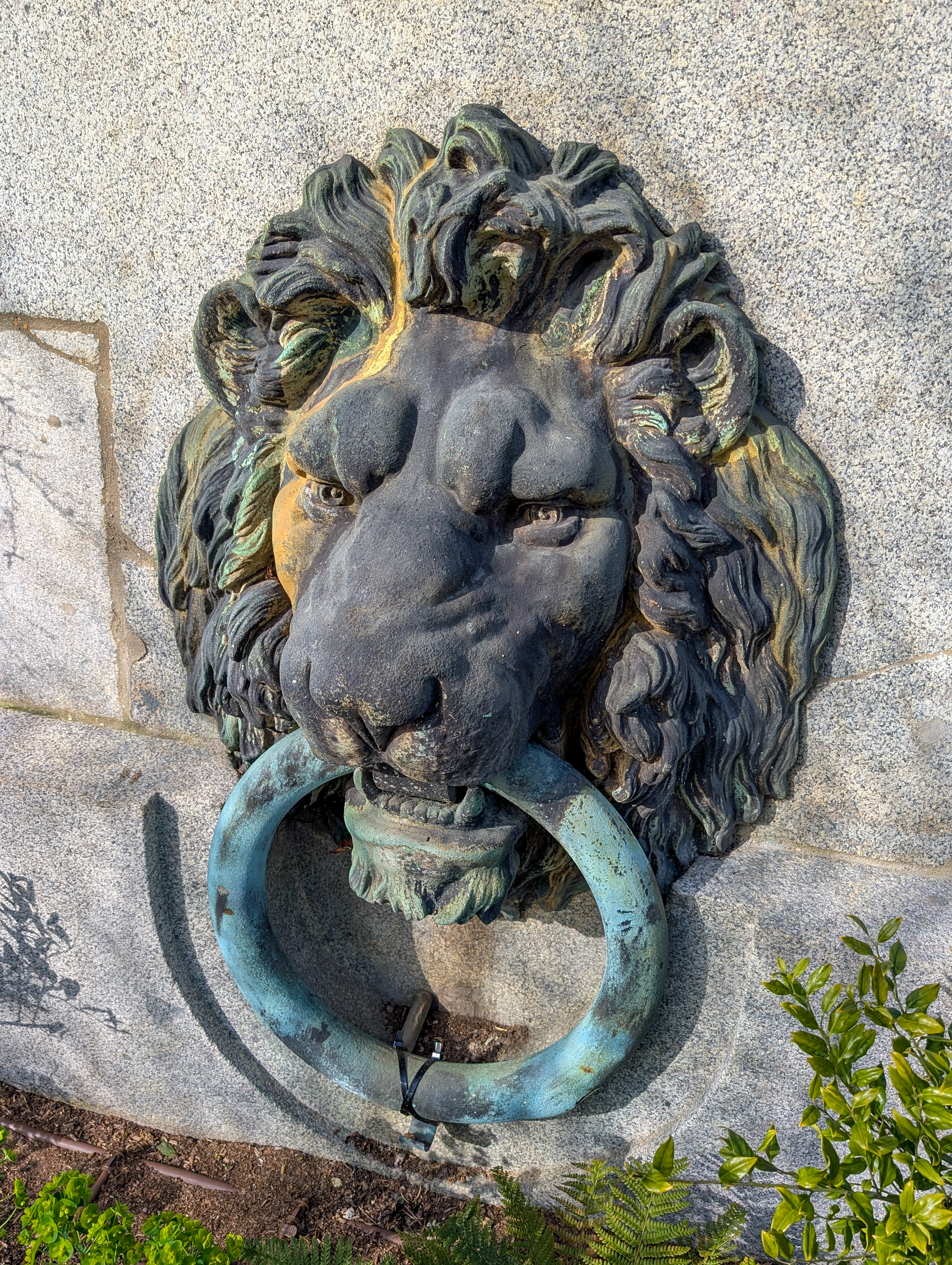
Lion mooring ring and foliage

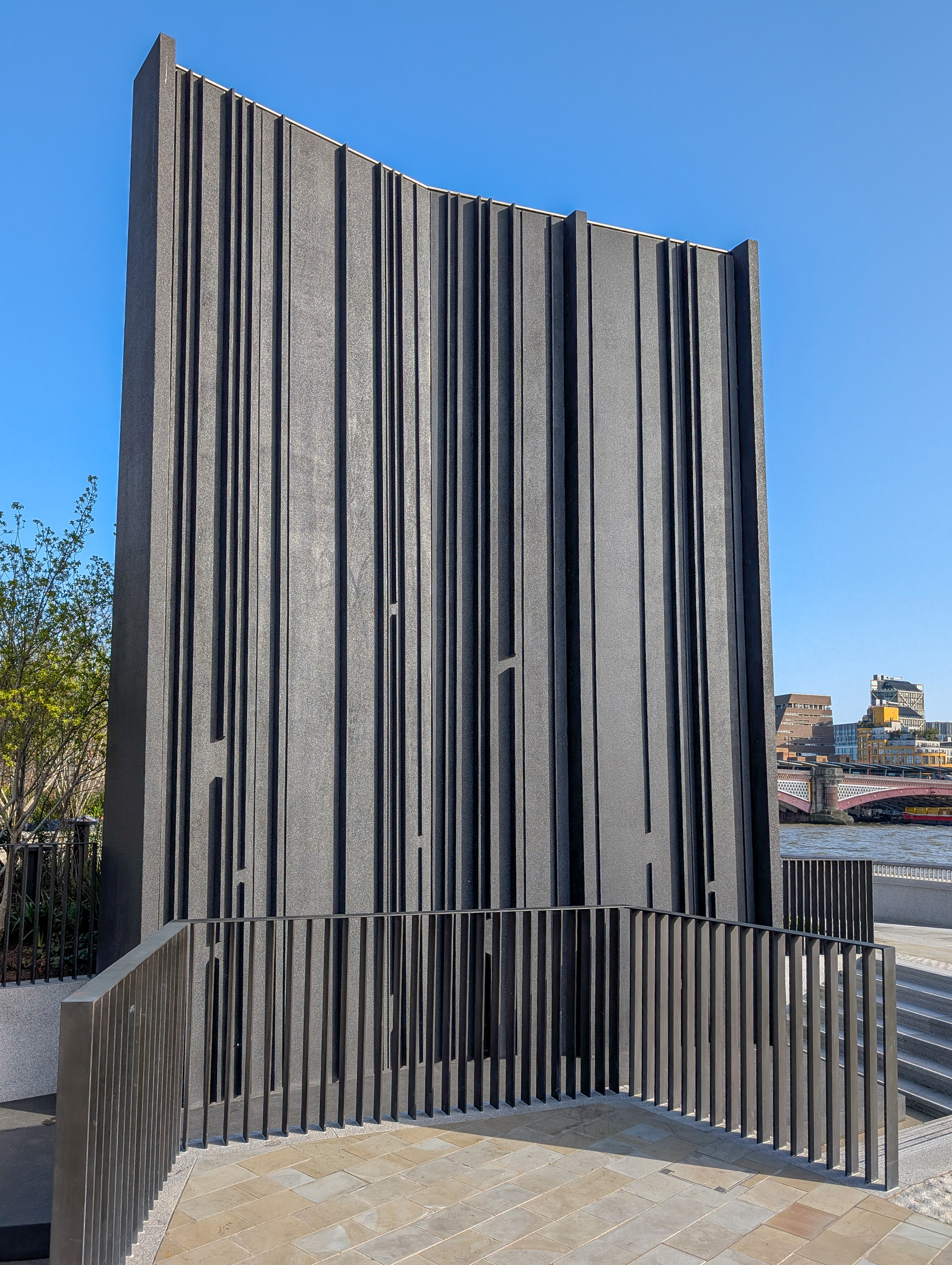
Waterwall sculpture
