= Statue of William Edward Forster =

Bronze statue in London

Coordinates: 51.5112°N 0.1132°W

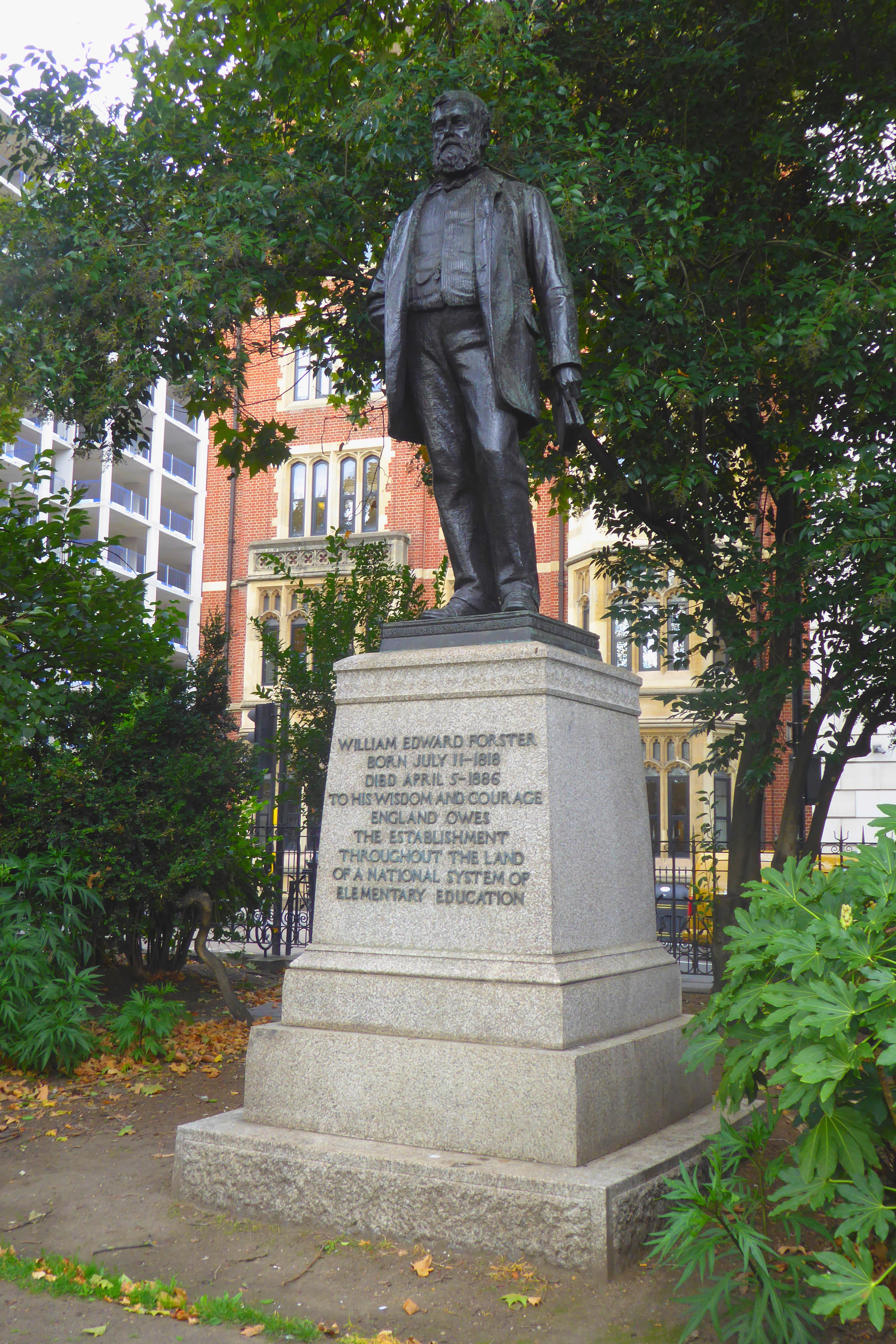
- Artist: Henry Richard Hope-Pinker
- Completion date: 1890
- Subject: William Edward Forster
- Location: London

Listed Building – Grade II
- Official name: Statue of William Edward Forster
- Designated: 24 February 1958
- Reference no.: 1066178

The statue of William Edward Forster is a Grade II listed statue within the Temple Gardens section of the Victoria Embankment Gardens in London.

The statue is a memorial to William Edward Forster, an educational reformer and politician who helped introduce state education to all members of the public, particularly through the Elementary Education Act 1870, largely penned by Forster as a Privy Councillor under William Ewart Gladstone.

Forster was also an abolitionist who assisted his uncle Thomas Fowell Buxton in the abolition movement. Buxton himself has a memorial fountain for his fight for abolition originally set on the corner of Parliament Square but now in Victoria Tower Gardens.

The memorial is by Henry Richard Hope-Pinker, a bronze statue upon a granite pedestal. It was unveiled in 1890 by Viscount Cranbrook, directly in front of the offices which at the time held the London School Board, an organisation which Edward Forster's work had helped in creating.
