= Henry Richard Hope-Pinker =

British sculptor (1850-1927)

Henry Richard Hope-Pinker (1850 – 3 August 1927) was a British sculptor, notable for his portraits and statues of contemporary Victorian figures.

== Biography ==
Hope-Pinker was born in Peckham in southeast London. His father was a builder and master mason, based in Hove, where Hope-Pinker received some training in stone carving before entering the Royal Academy Schools in London. Working in London, Hope-Pinker became a member of the Royal Society of British Sculptors and was a specialist in portrait busts of high-profile contemporary figures. He carved several statues, including one of Charles Darwin, for the Oxford University Museum of Natural History. His bust of Henry Fawcett is in the National Portrait Gallery in London, which also hold two of his other works. Hope-Pinker became a member of the Art Workers' Guild in 1885, and was elected as Master in 1915.

== Selected works ==
- Bust of George Rolleston, 1856, Oxford University Museum of Natural History
- Statue of Queen Victoria, 1894, Georgetown, Guyana
- Statues of Charles Darwin, John Hunter, Thomas Sydenham and Roger Bacon, Oxford University Museum of Natural History
- Statue of Henry Fawcett, Market Place, Salisbury
- Statue of William Edward Forster, 1890, Victoria Embankment Gardens, London
- Bust of Joseph Prestwich, c. 1901, Oxford University Museum of Natural History
- Bust of Walter Frank Raphael Weldon, Oxford University Museum of Natural History
- Bust of John Scott Burdon-Sanderson, 1907 Oxford University Museum of Natural History
- Several busts and statuettes of James Martineau
- Terracotta medallion of Robert Henry Soden Smith, 1884, Victoria and Albert Museum, London
