= Statue of Robert Raikes, London =

Public sculpture by Thomas Brock

Robert Raikes
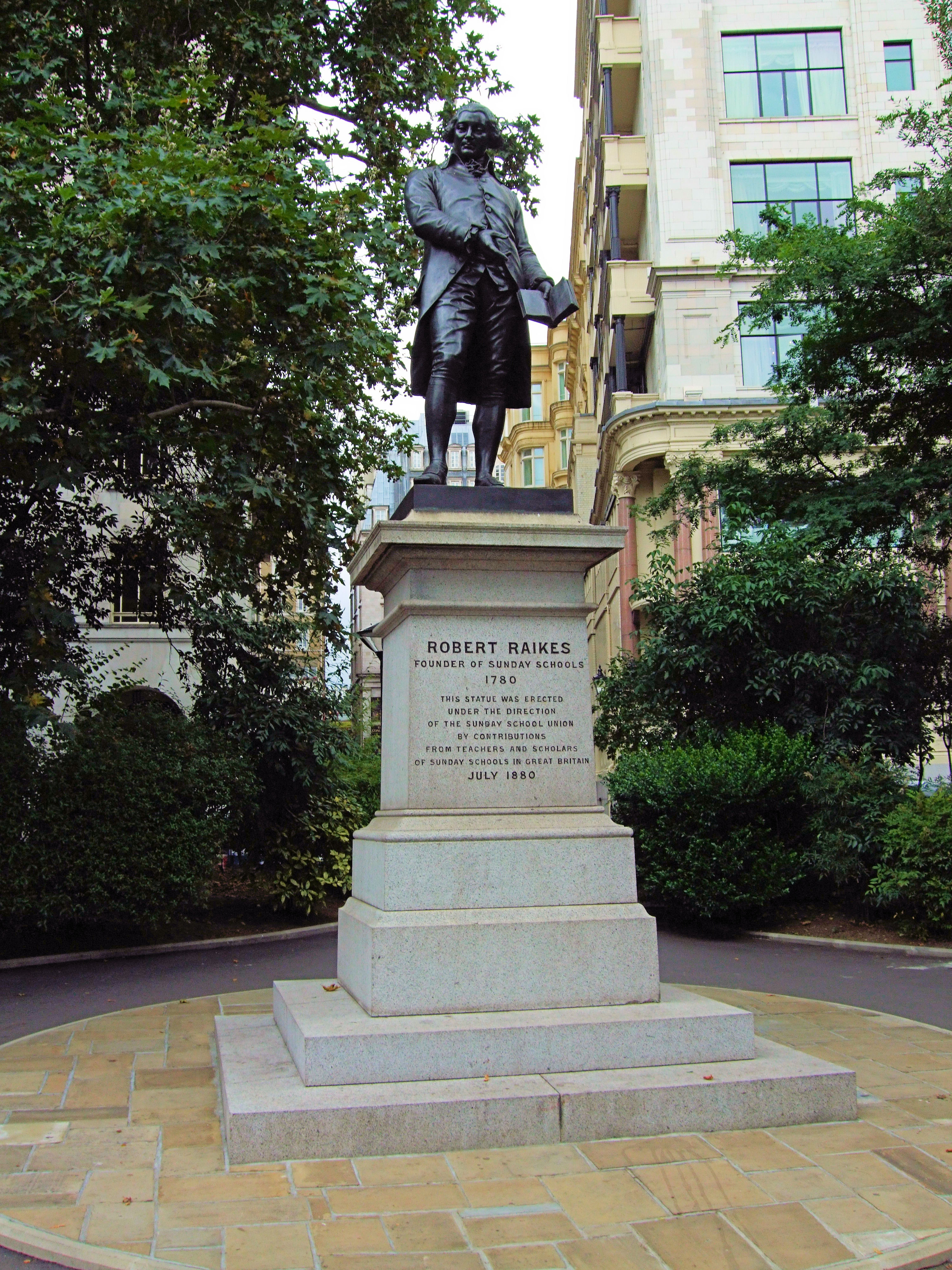
- The statue in 2012
- Artist: Thomas Brock
- Type: Statue
- Medium: Bronze
- Subject: Robert Raikes
- Location: London, WC2 United Kingdom; 51°30′34″N 0°07′13″W

A statue of Robert Raikes, often regarded as being the founder of Sunday schools, executed by the sculptor Thomas Brock, stands in Victoria Embankment Gardens, London, United Kingdom. It was unveiled by the Earl of Shaftesbury on 3 July 1880 and marked the centenary of the opening of the first Sunday school. The critic Edmund Gosse considered the statue to be "as good as anything of the kind we possess in England". In 1958 it was designated a Grade II-listed building.

The front of the plinth reads: ROBERT RAIKES/ FOUNDER OF SUNDAY SCHOOLS/ 1780/ THIS STATUE WAS ERECTED/ UNDER THE DIRECTION/ OF THE SUNDAY SCHOOL UNION/ BY CONTRIBUTIONS/ FROM TEACHERS AND SCHOLARS/ OF SUNDAY SCHOOLS IN GREAT BRITAIN/ JULY 1880. An inscription below the figure's right foot reads: THOS BROCK SCULPT/ LONDON. 1880.

In 1929 replicas of the statue were cast for erection the following year in Gloucester and Toronto, for the 150th anniversary the following year of opening of the first Sunday school.

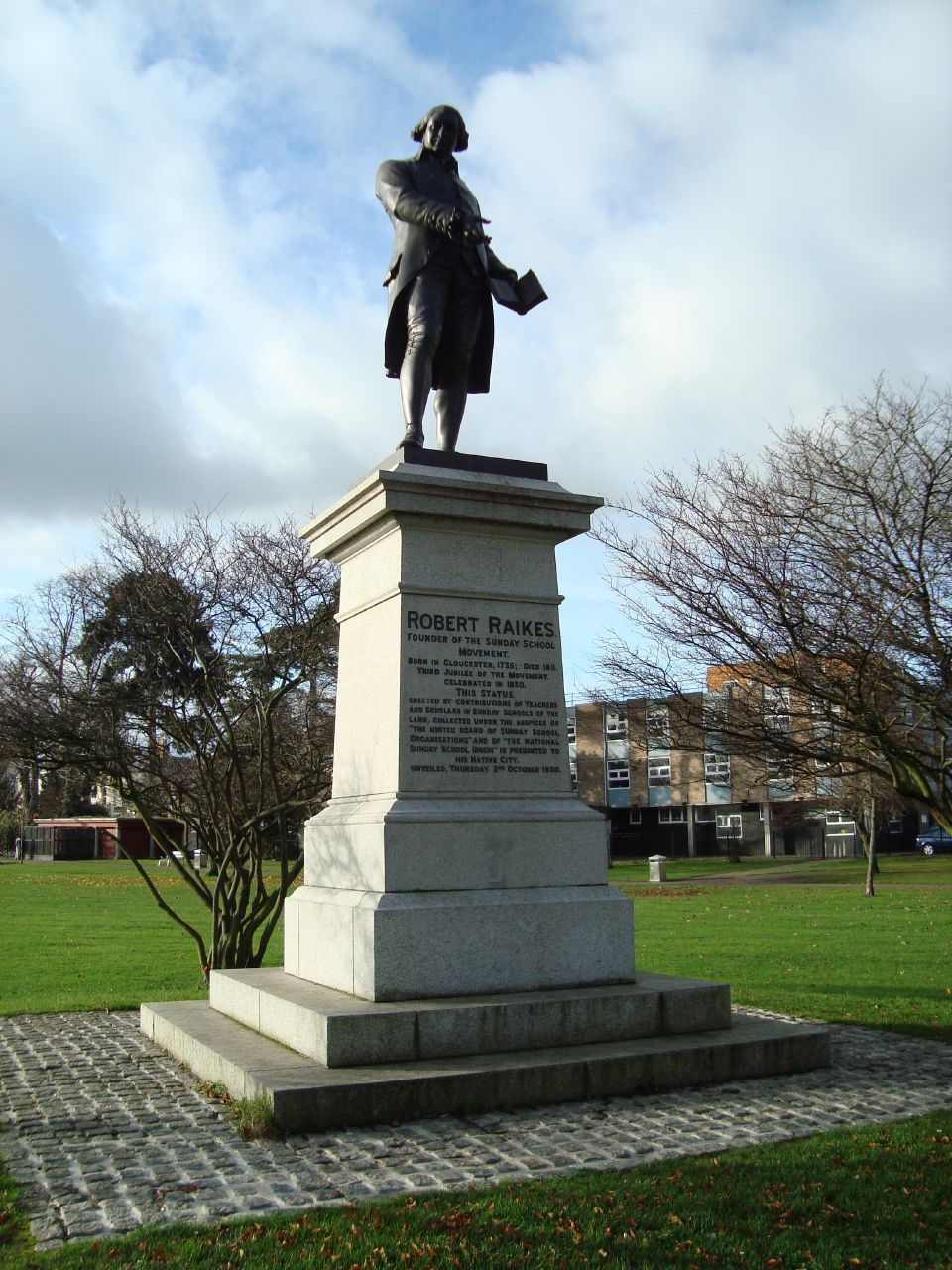
The cast of the statue in Gloucester

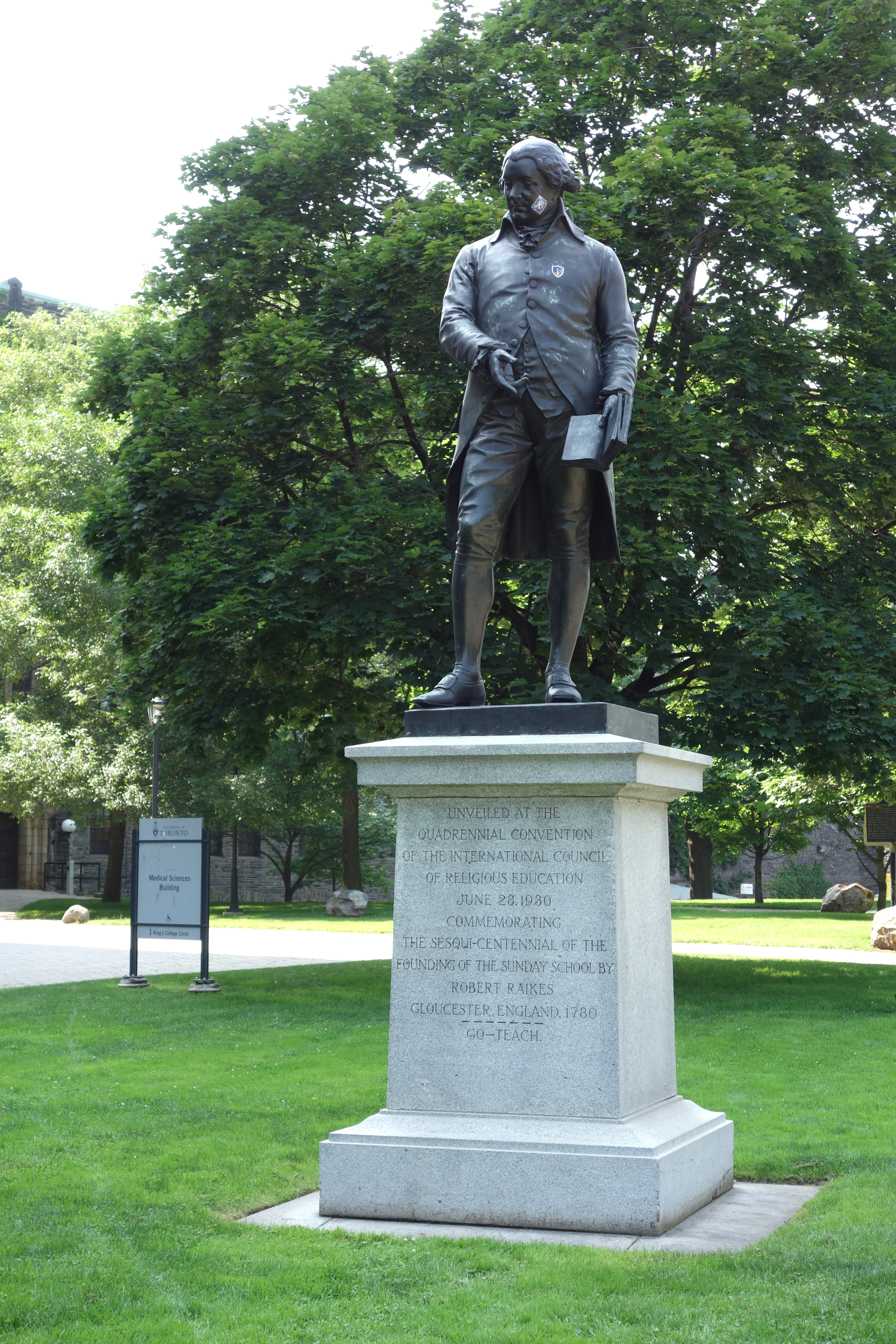
The cast in Toronto
