= Mary Grant (sculptor) =

British sculptor (1831–1908)

- Born: 1831; Perthshire, Scotland
- Died: 20 February 1908 (aged 76–77); London, England
- Known for: Sculpture

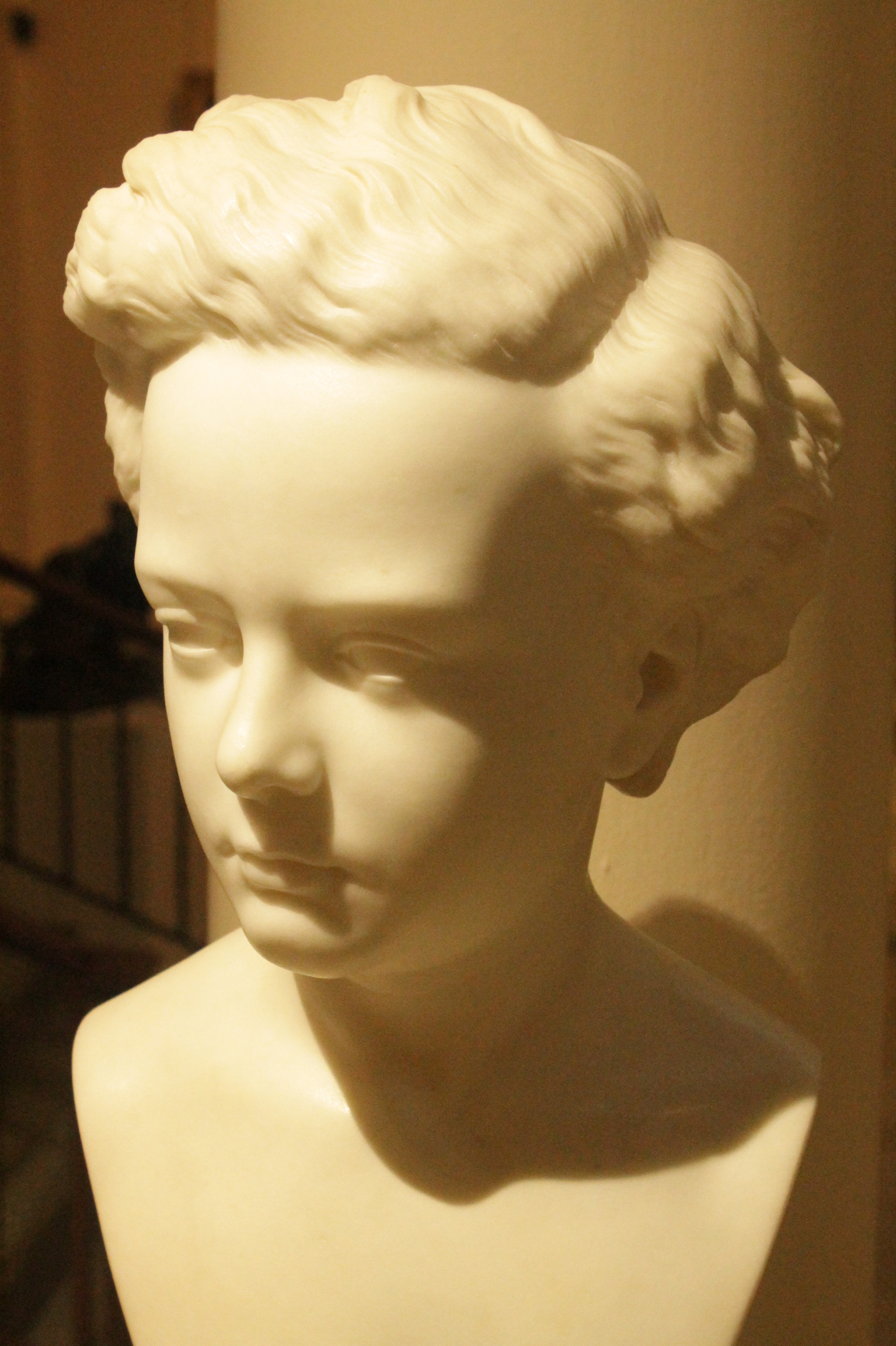
Bust of an unknown child by Mary Grant 1874, Perth Museum

Mary Grant (1831–1908) was one of the most eminent female sculptors of 19th century Britain, with numerous commissions from the rich and famous.

== Life ==
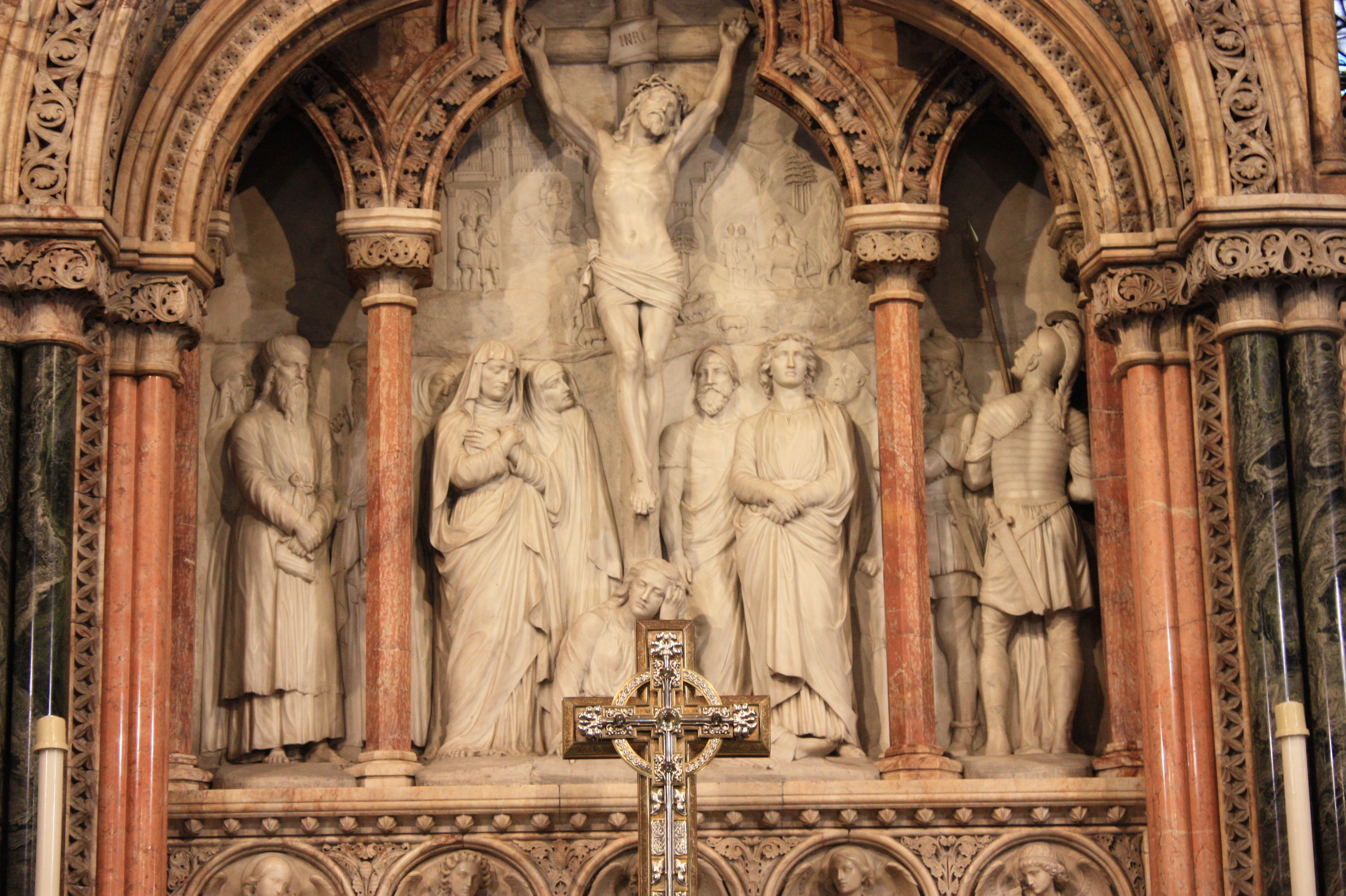
Reredos in St Mary's Episcopal Cathedral, Edinburgh

Grant was born in 1831 in Kilgraston House in Perthshire, into a very well-connected family. Her grandfather was Lord Elgin of Elgin Marbles fame. Her aunt and uncle were Mary Anne Grant and Sir Francis Grant, both artists, the latter being President of the Royal Academy. Another uncle was General James Hope Grant, a British military hero. These artistic and aristocratic connections would serve her well in the otherwise notoriously male preserve of figurative sculpture.

She took up sculpting in her twenties, and went to Florence to study under Odoardo Fantacchiotti and then went to Rome to study under John Gibson, both highly skilled figurative sculptors. After a period in Paris studying with Michel-Louis Victor Mercier she then set up studio in London, working under the guidance of John Henry Foley.

From 1864 to 1877 she returned to Kilgraston House, and worked from there.

In 1877 she moved to Ebenezer House on Albany Street, London and in 1889 to 29 Tite Street, London, then becoming the immediate neighbour of John Singer Sargent and Ernest Ibbetson. She worked much in cast plaster, using Fernando Meacci to aid in the process.

She exhibited her work at the Woman's Building at the 1893 World's Columbian Exposition in Chicago, Illinois.

She never married. She died on 20 February 1908 in London.

== Principal works ==
- Queen Victoria for the Rajah of Kapurthala.
- Memorial fountain to Henry Fawcett, a campaigner for Women’s Suffrage, on the Victoria Embankment in London
- Figures surrounding the main doorway of Lichfield Cathedral.
- Bust of Charles Stewart Parnell
- Bust of Lord Alfred Tennyson
- Bust of Sir Francis Grant, her uncle
- Bust of Lady Augusta Stanley, Lady in Waiting to Queen Victoria and her aunt
- Relief portrait head of Henry Erskine
- Memorial to Augusta Bruce in the New Abbey Church, Dunfermline
- Reredos panel at altar in St Mary’s Episcopal Cathedral, Edinburgh (designed by John Oldrid Scott, sculpted by Mary Grant)
- Reredos in a church in Kilburn, London.
- Sculpted figures on screen in Winchester Cathedral
