= Statue of James Outram, London =

Sculpture by Matthew Noble

Statue of James Outram
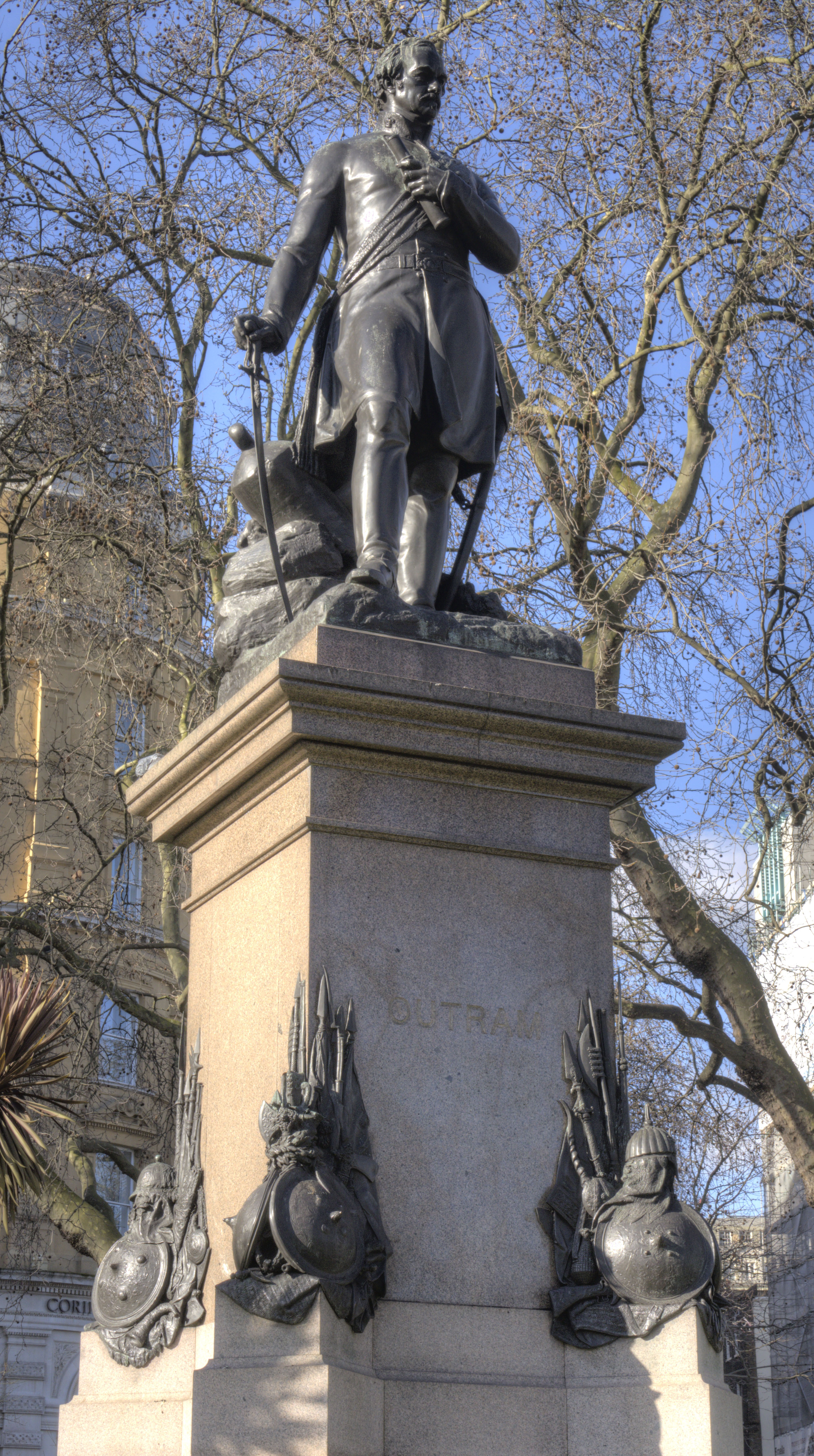
- The statue in 2015
- Artist: Matthew Noble
- Year: 1871; 155 years ago
- Type: Sculpture
- Medium: Bronze
- Location: London, WC2 United Kingdom; 51°30′23″N 0°07′23″W

The statue of James Outram, a work by Matthew Noble, stands in Whitehall Gardens in London, south of Hungerford Bridge. It is a Grade II listed structure.

Unusually, the plan to erect the statue began in Outram's own lifetime, at a public meeting held in Willis's Rooms, London, on 5 March 1861. The general had recently returned to Britain from India, the stage on which his military career had been played out, due to poor health. It was decided to erect an equestrian monument in Calcutta, with J. H. Foley as the sculptor, and a standing design by Matthew Noble in London, "near [the statue] of his illustrious comrade, Sir Henry Havelock", on Trafalgar Square. Permission for this site was refused by the First Commissioner of Works, who subsequently offered a site in the yet-to-be-created Embankment Gardens. The statue was unveiled by Lord Halifax, a former Secretary of State for India, on 17 August 1871.

The bronze statue rests on a granite pedestal.
