= W. T. Stead Memorial =

Memorial on the Victoria Embankment in London

Coordinates: 51.510843°N 0.1127621°W

W. T. Stead
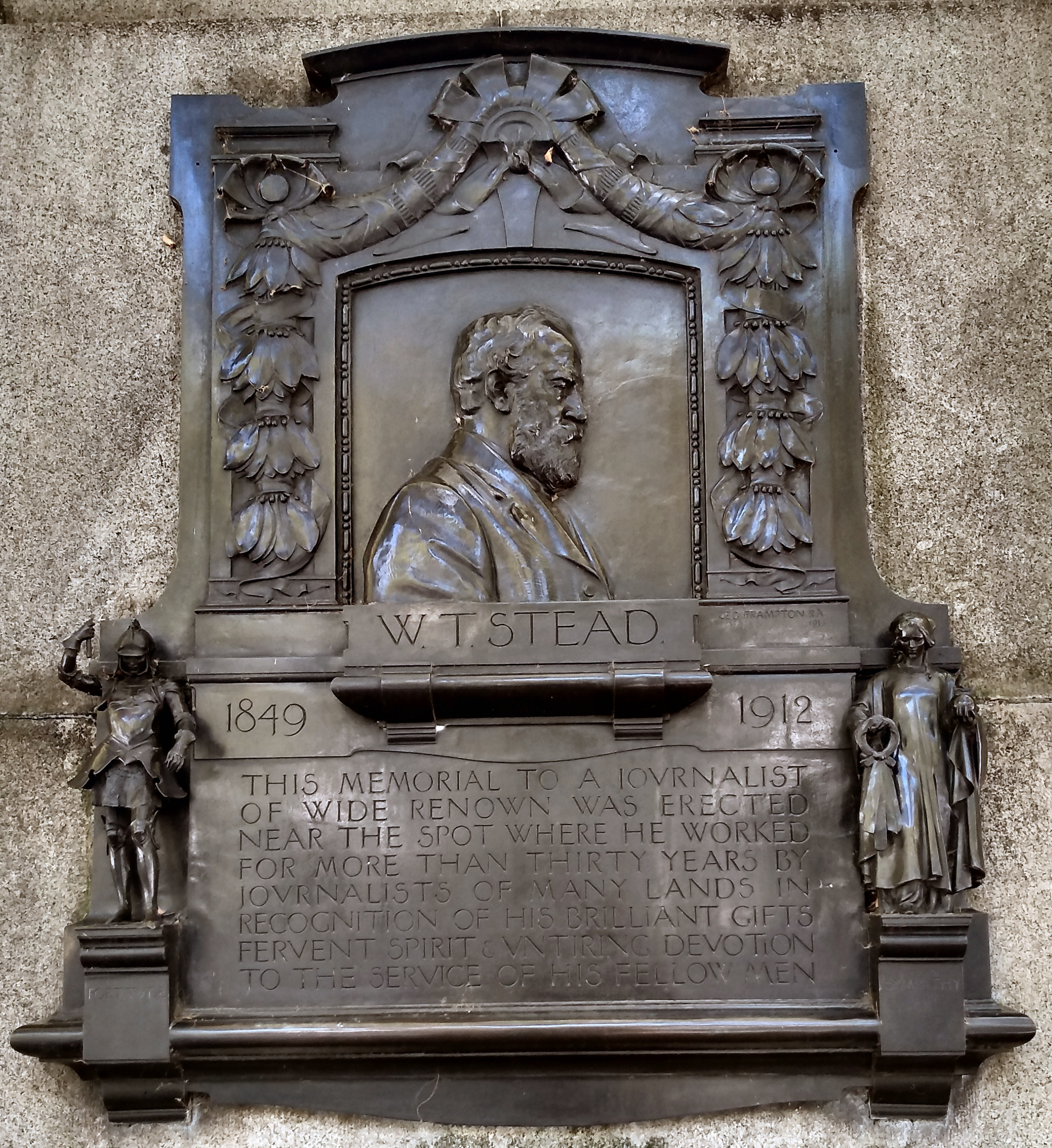
- Artist: George Frampton
- Completion date: 1920
- Subject: W. T. Stead
- Location: London

Listed Building – Grade II
- Official name: Memorial to WT Stead, Temple Pier
- Designated: 5 February 1970
- Reference no.: 1066170

The W. T. Stead Memorial is a Grade II listed bronze bas-relief on the Victoria Embankment in London. It is placed on a block flanking Temple Pier and is nearby to the King's Reach Memorial.

== History and description ==
William Thomas Stead was a controversial journalist and campaigner for social reform of the Victorian era. Among his writings were influential pieces for civil liberties and women's rights, with his article The Maiden Tribute of Modern Babylon helping to bring about the passing of the Stead Act which raised the age of consent from 13 to 16. He died during the sinking of the Titanic, last sighted helping women and children into a lifeboat.

The memorial was devised by a group at the Institute of Journalists, particularly under Robert Donald as chairman and Lord Northcliffe as Honorary Treasurer. Negotiations for a memorial on the Victoria Embankment were started from as early as the same year as Stead's death. Sites including the granite pedestal on the east side of Waterloo Bridge, opposite the Walter Besant Memorial and the two flanking what is now the King's Reach Memorial were considered. The west of the latter two was eventually chosen. The proposal came under some scrutiny from an institution set up to provide women's hostels in Stead's name. The concerns included whether W. T. Stead had status deserving of what was thought to be a statue. With the criticism the memorial was narrowly allowed to be placed along the Embankment. After delays caused by the First World War the memorial was finally unveiled by Wickham Steed in 1920. A copy of the memorial was given to New York City since American journalists had donated significantly to the fund; it was placed in central park.

The memorial consists of a portrait relief of Stead, surrounded by decorations. The inscription beneath is flanked by figures representing Fortitude and Sympathy.
