= Baron Ritchie of Dundee =

Barony in the Peerage of the United Kingdom

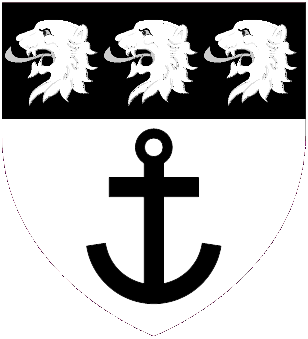
Arms of the Barons Ritchie of Dundee

Baron Ritchie of Dundee, of Welders in the Parish of Chalfont St Giles in the County of Buckingham, is a title in the Peerage of the United Kingdom. It was created in 1905 for the Conservative politician Charles Ritchie. He was Home Secretary between 1900 and 1902 and Chancellor of the Exchequer between 1902 and 1903.

He was succeeded by his second but only surviving son, the second Baron. He was Chairman of the Port of London Authority from 1925 to 1941. His son, the third Baron, served as Chairman of the London Stock Exchange from 1959 to 1965 and was admitted to the Privy Council in 1965. When he died the title passed to his younger brother, the fourth Baron, who in his turn was succeeded by his younger brother, the fifth Baron. As of 2010 the title is held by the latter's only son, the sixth Baron, who succeeded in 2008.

Another member of the Ritchie family was Sir James Thomson Ritchie, 1st Baronet, Lord Mayor of London from 1903 to 1904. He was the elder brother of the first Baron Ritchie of Dundee.

== Barons Ritchie of Dundee (1905) ==
- Charles Thomson Ritchie, 1st Baron Ritchie of Dundee (1838–1906)
- Charles Ritchie, 2nd Baron Ritchie of Dundee (1866–1948)
- John Kenneth Ritchie, 3rd Baron Ritchie of Dundee (1902–1975)
- Colin Neville Ower Ritchie, 4th Baron Ritchie of Dundee (1908–1978)
- Harold Malcolm Ritchie, 5th Baron Ritchie of Dundee (1919–2008)
- Charles Rupert Rendall Ritchie, 6th Baron Ritchie of Dundee (b. 1958)

The heir apparent is the present holder's son Hon. Sebastian Rendall Ritchie (b. 2004).

== Arms ==
Coat of arms of Baron Ritchie of Dundee

Crest
Out of an Eastern Crown Or a Unicorn's Head Argent armed of the first and charged on the neck with an Anchor Sable
Escutcheon
Argent an Anchor Sable on a Chief of the last three Lions' Heads erased of the first
Supporters
On either side an Unicorn Gules gorged with an Eastern Crown Or the dexter charged on the shoulder with a Purse Or and the sinister with a Balance also Or
Motto
Virtute Acquiritur Honos (Honour is acquired by virtue)

== See also ==
- Ritchie Baronets
