= Henry Fawcett Memorial =

Memorial in London

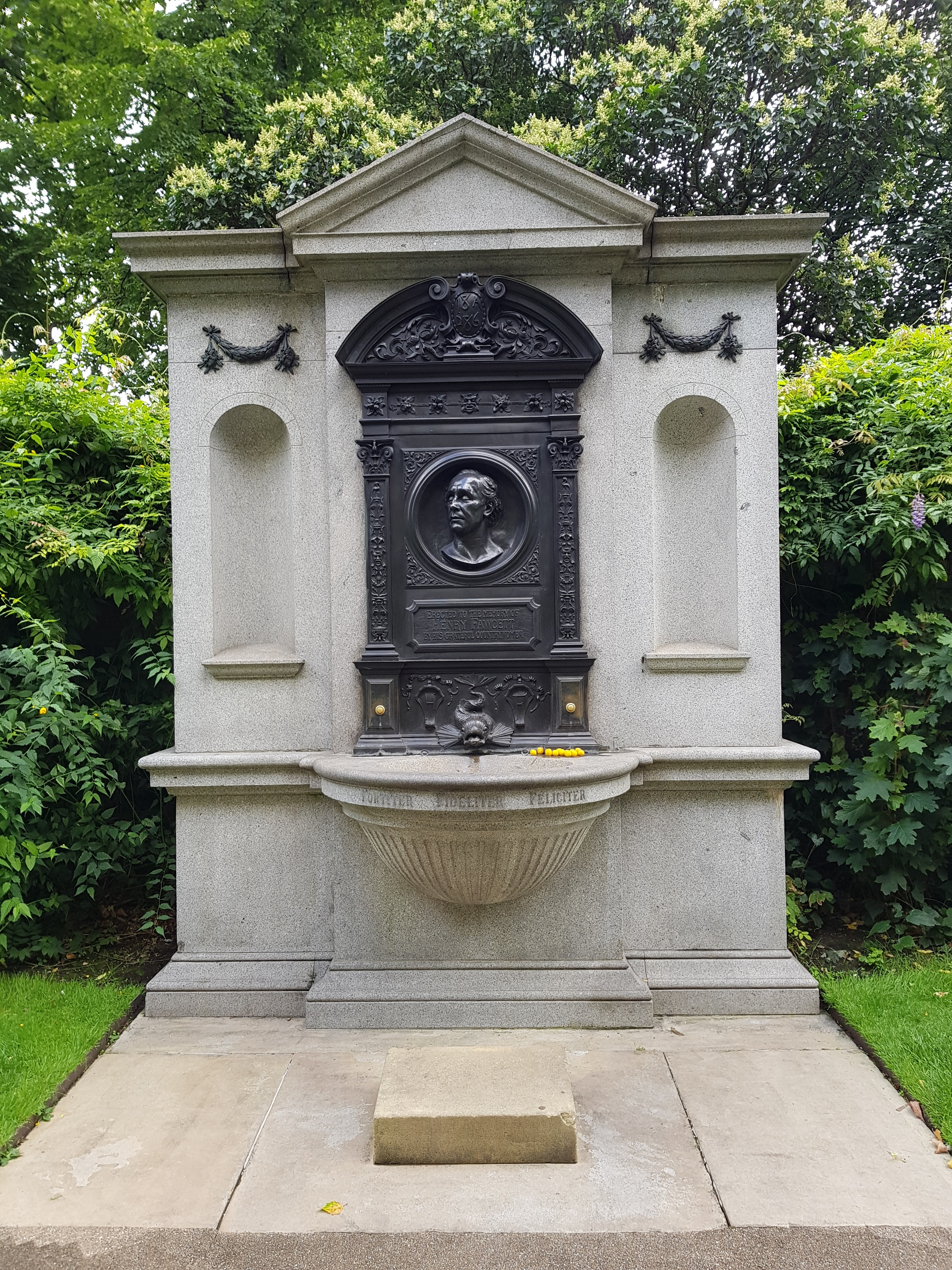
- The memorial in 2017
- Artist: Mary Grant
- Year: 1886
- Subject: Henry Fawcett
- Designation: Grade II
- Location: London; 51°30′33″N 0°07′14″W

The Henry Fawcett Memorial is a memorial fountain commemorating Henry Fawcett, installed during 1886 at the Victoria Embankment Gardens in London, United Kingdom. Mary Grant created the portrait relief and George Frampton produced the ornamental elements. Basil Champneys was the architect for the memorial. The memorial is listed at Grade II.
