= Dolphin lamp standard =

Lamp design used on the Thames Embankment, London

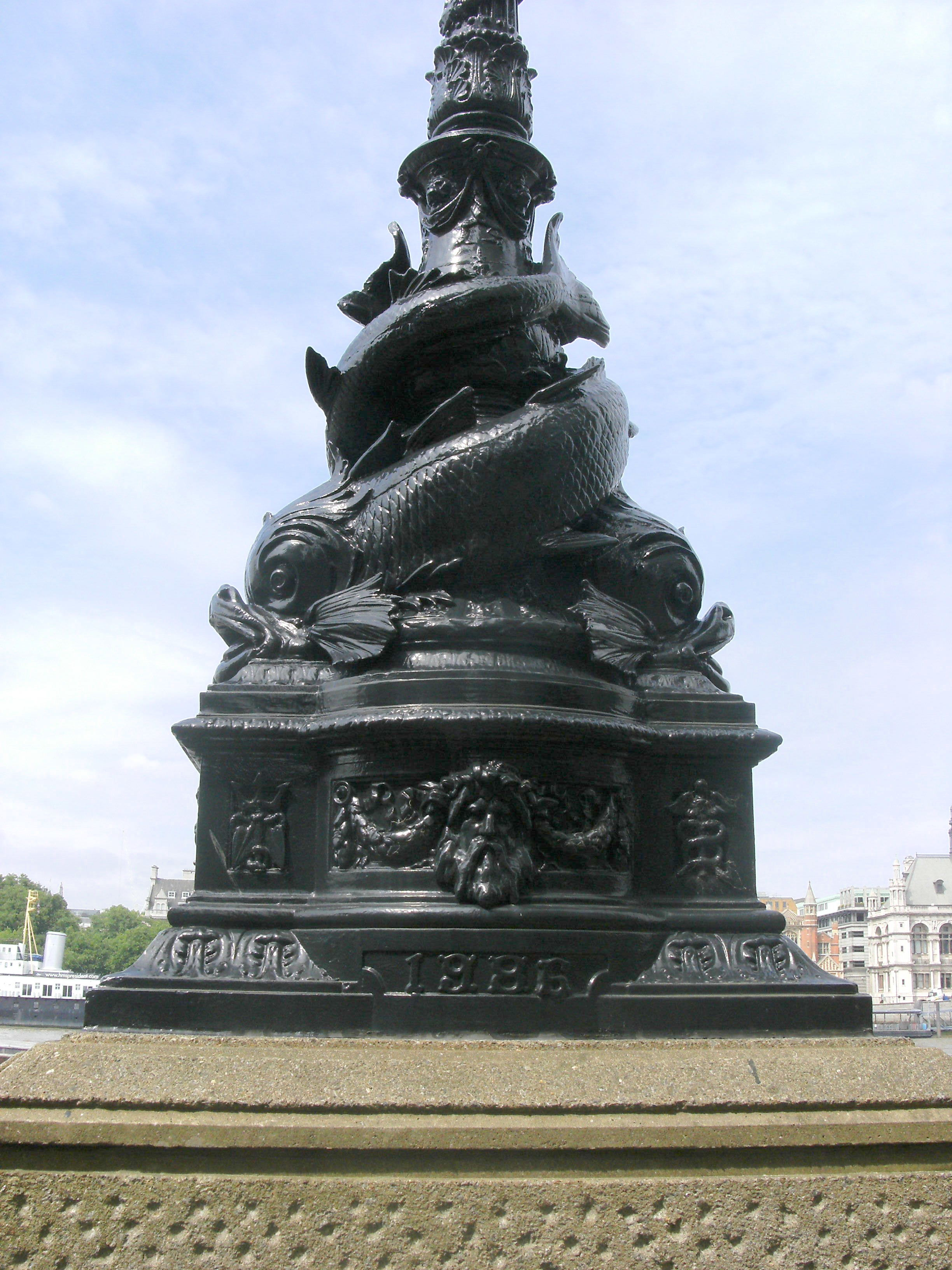
Distinctive base of Vulliamy's dolphin lamp posts

Dolphin lamp standards provide electric light along much of the Thames Embankment in London, United Kingdom. Two stylised dolphins or sturgeons writhe around the base of a standard lamp post, supporting a fluted column bearing electric lights in an opaque white globe, topped by a metal crown. Many of the lamps are mounted on granite plinths.

The lamp posts were designed by George John Vulliamy and modelled by Charles Henry Mabey, architect of the Victoria Embankment wall and river stairs. They were based on statues of heraldic dolphins or fish with intertwined tails at the Fontana del Nettuno in the Piazza del Popolo in Rome, which was constructed in 1822–23.

In the late 1860s, the London Metropolitan Board of Works decided to light the new Thames embankments with electric lights, and asked for submissions of designs. Several possible designs were published in the contemporary illustrated press including the Illustrated London News and The Builder in March 1870, including Vulliamy's "dolphin" design; a design by Timothy Butler decorated with climbing children and an overflowing cornucopia, cast by the Coalbrookdale Company; and a more restrained classical design by Joseph Bazalgette decorated with lion's feet, inspired by classical tripods, and modelled by S. Burnett.

Vulliamy had become superintending architect to the Metropolitan Board of Works in March 1861, and he also designed benches for the embankments with cast iron ends in the form of sphinxes and camels, inspired by Cleopatra's Needle. Bazalgette was the Board's chief engineer.

Vulliamy's lamp design was the most popular, and examples of his design dominate the Victoria Embankment and Albert Embankment. Bazalgette's design was used along the Chelsea Embankment. Butler's design was used in very limited numbers, with at least two near the Chelsea Embankment. The lamps originally used electric Yablochkov candles, but the early electric lights were inefficient and were replaced by gas lights by 1884. They were converted back to electricity in 1900. Many now have a Grade II listing.

Further dolphin lamp posts were added on the north and south banks of the Thames in 1977, to commemorate the Silver Jubilee of Queen Elizabeth II.

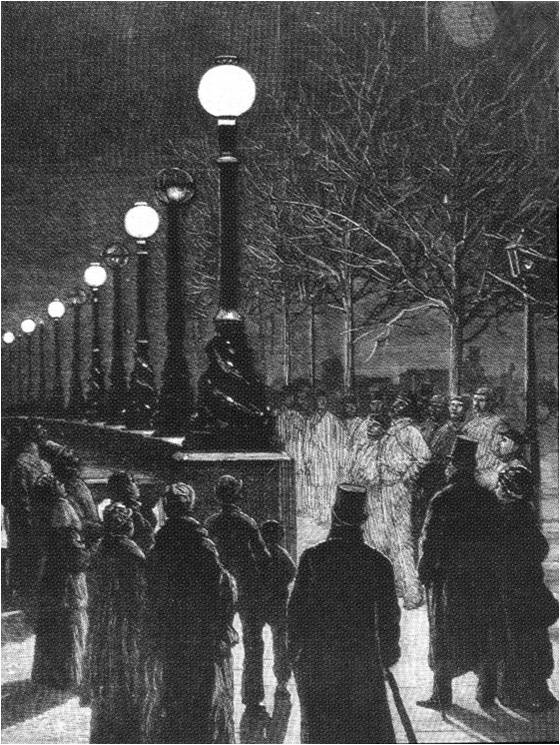
Yablochkov candles on the Victoria Embankment, December 1878, alternating with the original gas standards to show the difference

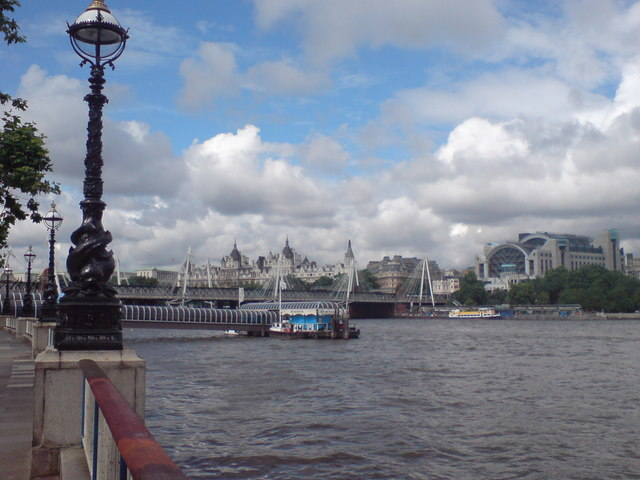
Dolphin lamp post on the Albert Embankment, on the south side of the Thames, between Hungerford Bridge and Waterloo Bridge

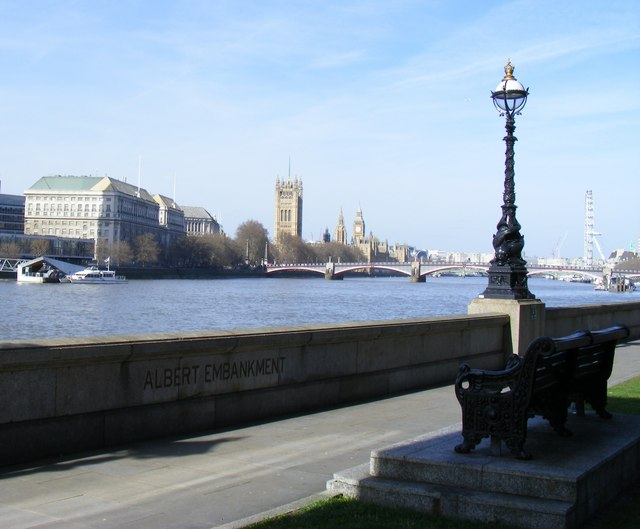
Dolphin lamp post on the Albert Embankment, between Lambeth Bridge and Vauxhall Bridge

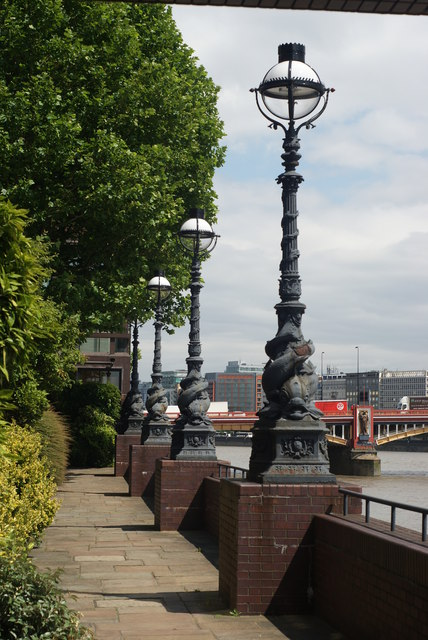
Dolphin lamp posts near Vauxhall Bridge

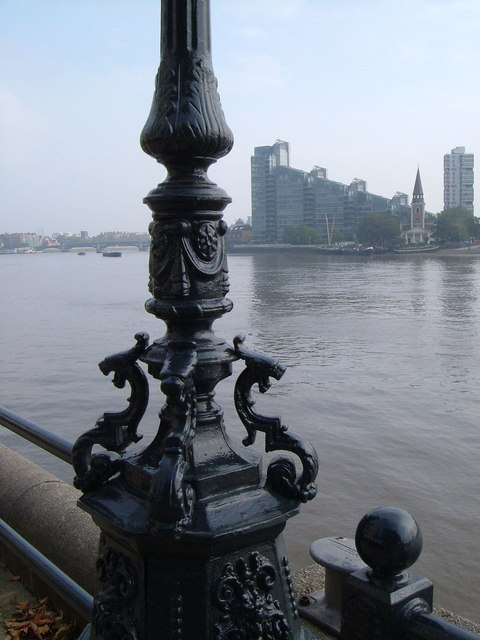
Bazalgette lamp post on Chelsea Embankment
