= Timothy Butler (sculptor) =

British figurative sculptor (1806–1885)

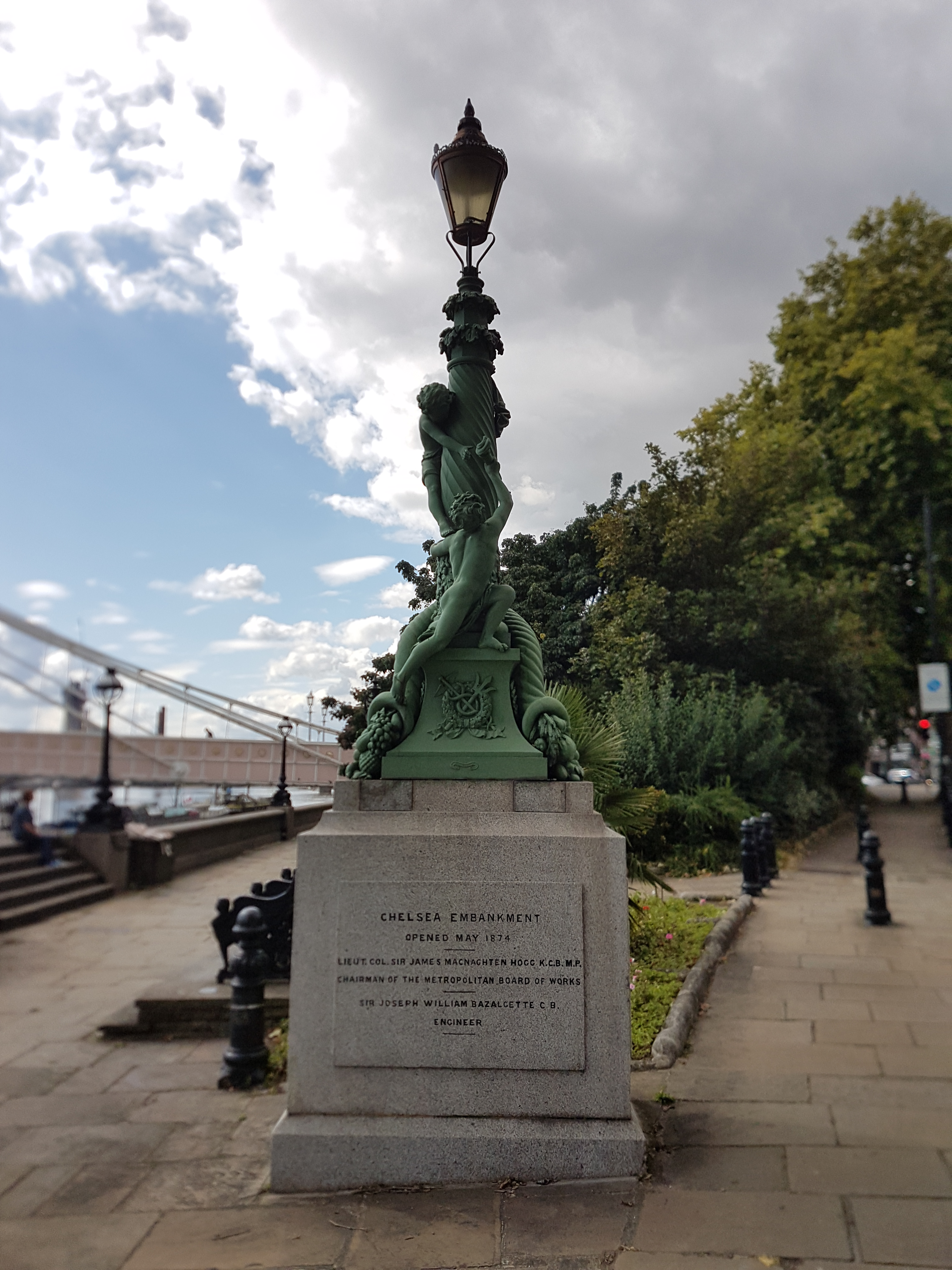
Butler's design for lamp standards for the Victoria Embankment which would not be adopted.

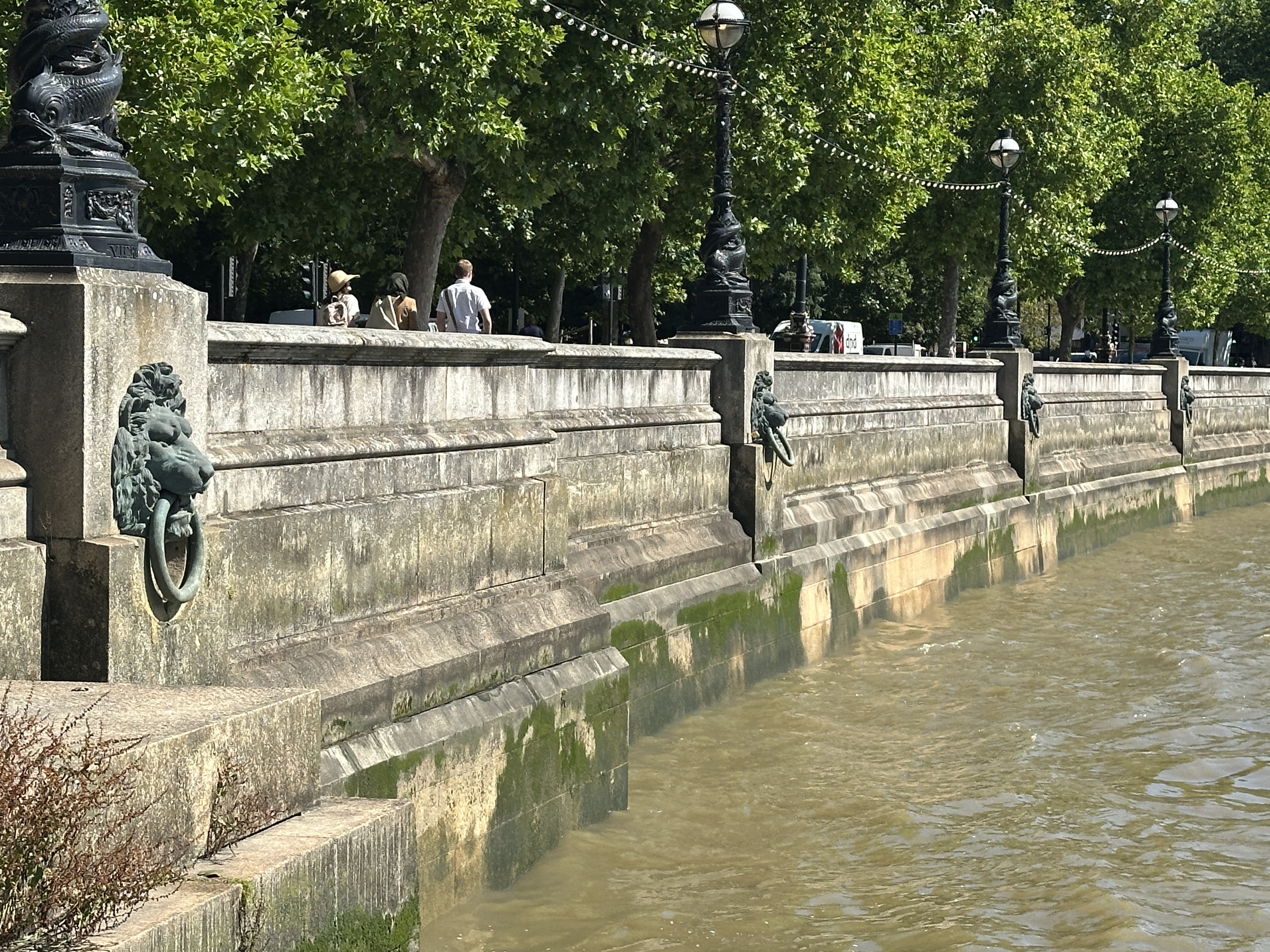
Butler's lion's head mooring rings, alongside the adopted dolphin lamp standard design.

Timothy Butler (1806–1885) was a 19th-century British figurative sculptor.

His most noteworthy public works are the lion mooring rings lining the Thames Embankment. He would also submit a design for lamp standards for the Victoria Embankment which were favoured by The Builder. While the design would not be used, two examples would be produced and placed either side of Albert Bridge along the Chelsea Embankment to mark the latter's opening.

== Life ==
He was born in Caversham in Oxfordshire in 1806. He won a silver medal at the Society of Arts in 1824. He entered the Royal Academy Schools in 1825 at the recommendation of William Behnes. He won the Royal Academy's silver medal in 1827.

He exhibited at the Royal Academy from 1828 until 1879.

Around 1850 he tutored John Adams-Acton.

From 1851 he lived at 1 Middlesex Place in London. From 1860 he lived at Marylebone Road.

He died at 186 Euston Road near St Pancras in London on 6 September 1885 and was buried on the western side of Highgate Cemetery.

== Family ==
His daughter Clehorow Caroline Butler was also a sculptor.

== Works ==
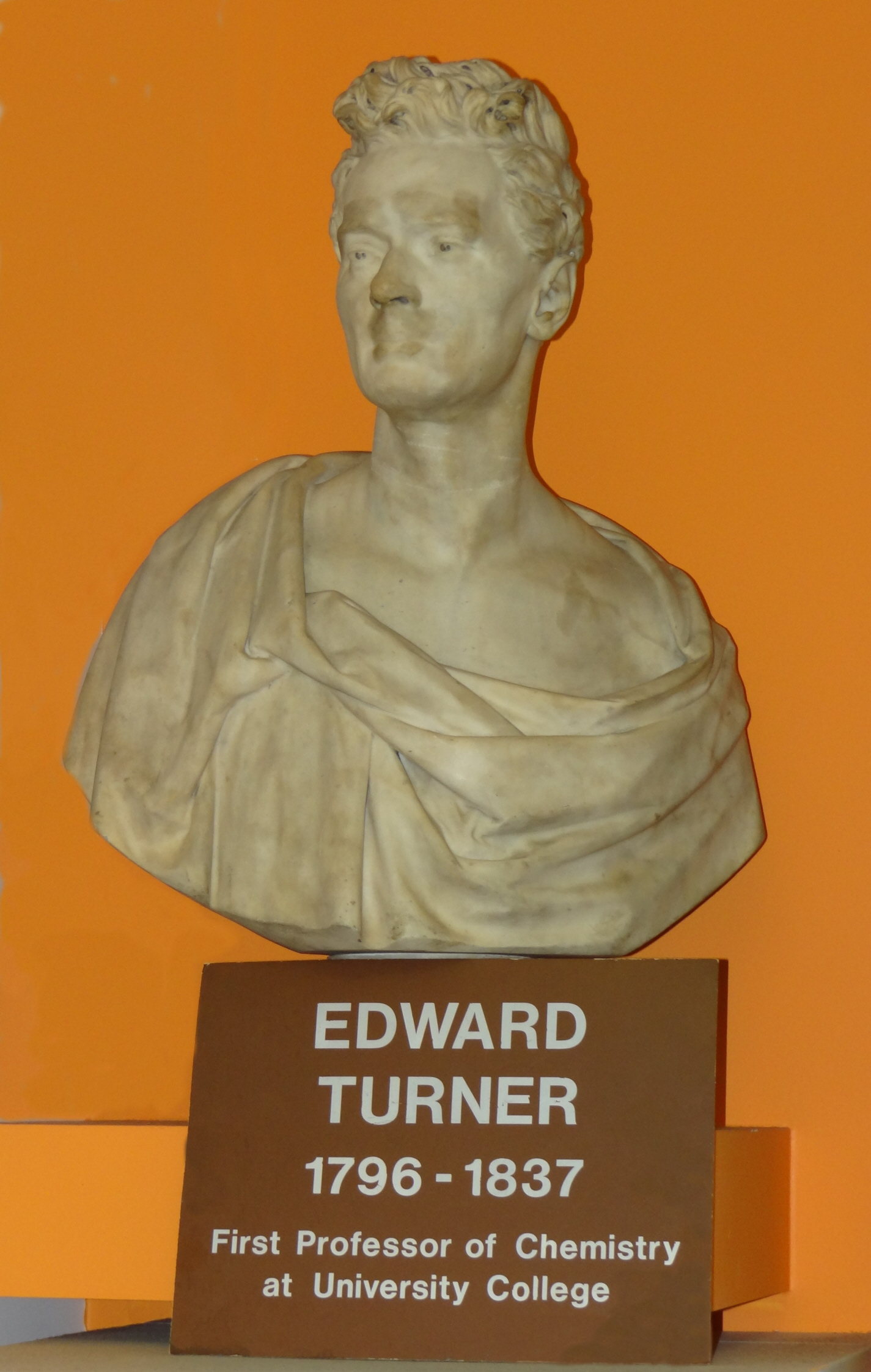
Edward Turner chemist

- Bust of Thomas Musgrave, Bishop of Hereford (1839) exhibited at Royal Academy
- Bust of Sir John Kirby Hedges (1841) currently in wallingford at town council offices
- Bust of the Earl of Granard (1841) exhibited at Royal Academy
- Bust of Sir James Eyre (1842) for Corporation of Hereford
- Bust of Charles Kemble (1844) exhibited at Royal Academy
- Bust of the Hon Mrs Norton (1844) for Richard Brinsley Sheridan
- Bust of Dr Woolff (1846) exhibited at Royal Academy
- Bust of Samuel Cooper (1851) at Royal College of Surgeons
- Statue of the Earl of Leicester (1858) on Dereham Town Hall
- Bust of Joseph Bazalgette (1860) exhibited at Royal Academy
- Bust of Sir Richard Kirby (1862) exhibited at Royal Academy
- Statue of Prof John Narrien at Staff College Farnborough
- Busts of Thomas Eton and his wife (1865) Bristol General Hospital
- Bust of Dr William Clark (1866) Trinity College, Cambridge
- Bust of Lord Rollo (1867) exhibited at Royal Academy
- Bust of Charles Henry Cooper (1868) Cambridge Town Hall
- Lion Heads capping sewage work outlets at South Bank Embankment (1870)
- Ornate lamps on Embankment (1870)
- Bust of Arthur Purvis (1870) Cocanada in Madras
- Statue of Richard Cobden (1877) at Bradford Town Hall
- Bust of T. Hughes (1878) exhibited at Royal Academy
- Bust of Hugh Falconer at Royal Society of London
- Bust of Charles Kahn
- Bust of Prof Edward Turner
- Bust of Edward R. Daniell

== Graves ==
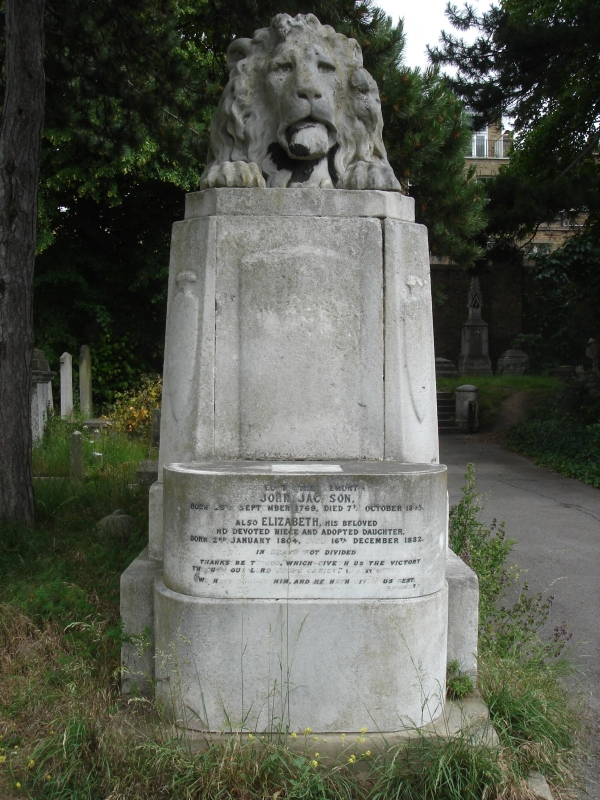
Jackson's burial monument, Brompton

- James Ince at Hadley in Hertfordshire (1829)
- Anne Marriott at Horsmonden in Kent (1831)
- Lady Thompson at Fareham in Hampshire (1833)
- William Prescott at Hendon (1836)
- Lord Douglas Hallyburton in Kensal Green Cemetery (1841)
- James Ince Jr at Hadley (1845)
- Edward Miller at Goudhurst in Kent (1846)
- John Jackson pugilist (1849) in Brompton Cemetery
- Charles Ince at Hadley (1850)
- General Peter de la Motte in Kensal Green Cemetery (1861)
