= Albert Embankment =

Road and footpath in Lambeth, London

Coordinates: 51.4910°N 0.1225°W

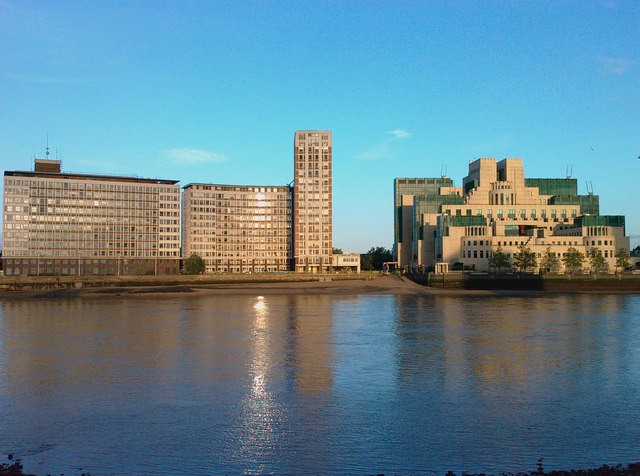
Albert Embankment, including the SIS Building (right), pictured from Millbank in 2008

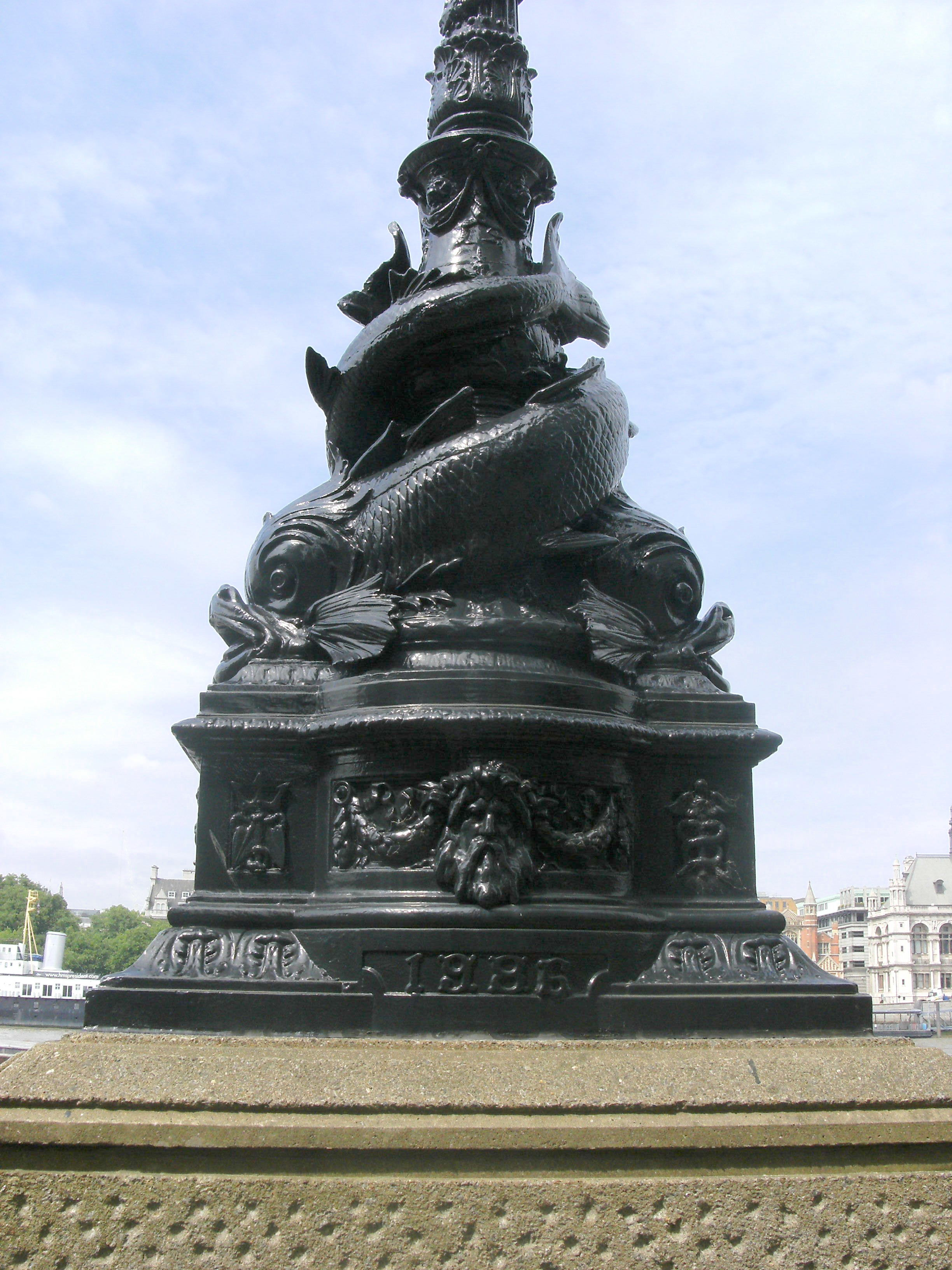
Sturgeon lamp standards line the embankment.

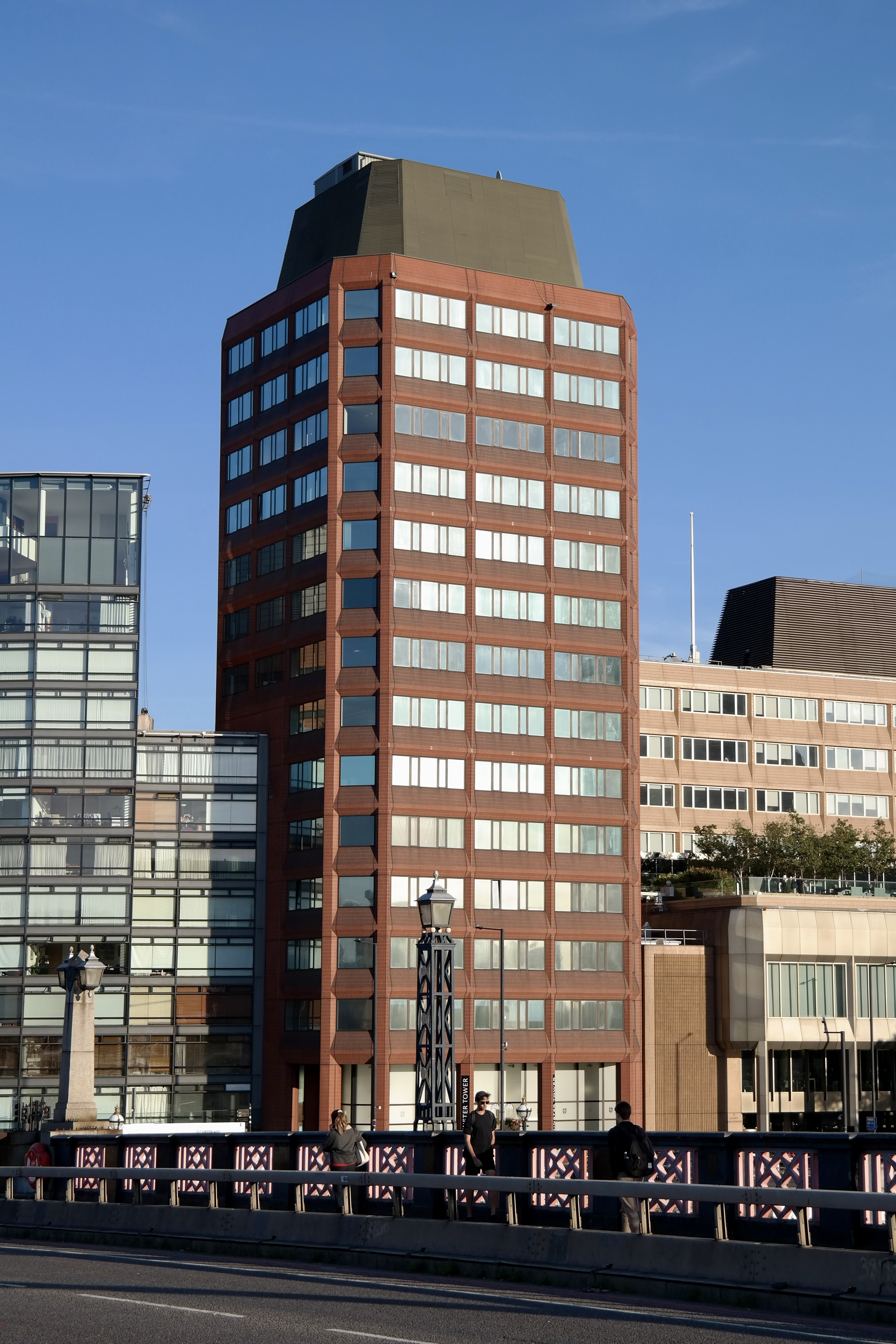
Westminster Tower on the north end of the Albert Embankment

Albert Embankment is part of the river bank on the south side of the River Thames in Central London. It stretches approximately one mile (1.6 km) northward from Vauxhall Bridge to Westminster Bridge, and is located in the London Borough of Lambeth.

== History ==
The Albert Embankment was built for the Metropolitan Board of Works under the immediate direction of engineer John Grant (not Sir Joseph Bazalgette, as is commonly supposed; Bazalgette was chief engineer to the Board). It was commenced in September 1865, and opened in May 1868. The purpose was to create a new highway and open space, and to help even out irregularities in the riverfront (since malodorous mud accumulated in the wider places). It is sometimes said the Albert Embankment was created to prevent flooding in the Lambeth area, but that was not its purpose. In fact the Albert Embankment was built on arches to permit vessels to continue to access landside business premises, such as draw docks; these already had their own defensive walls — as did most of the tidal Thames. After the Embankment was completed, floods continued to occur owing to defects in these walls (e.g. in 1877 and 1928). Any flood protection the Embankment gave was incidental.

Unlike Bazalgette's Thames Embankment (including Chelsea Embankment and Victoria Embankment), the Albert Embankment does not incorporate major interceptor sewers. This allowed the southern section of the embankment (upstream from Lambeth Bridge) to include a pair of tunnels onto a small slipway, named White Hart Draw Dock, whose origins can be traced back to the 14th century. This is contrary to the popular myth that the dock was built and used by the nearby Royal Doulton's pottery works to transport clay and finished goods to and from the Port of London. From spring 2009, refurbishment of White Hart Dock commenced as part of an ongoing public art project being delivered by Lambeth council.

Some of the reclaimed land was sold to the trustees of St Thomas' Hospital. To the north of Lambeth Bridge, the embankment is a narrower pedestrian promenade in front of the hospital, with motor traffic carried behind the hospital on Lambeth Palace Road.

In common with other 'Bazalgatte' works, the original embankment is adorned with sturgeon lamp standards to the designs of George Vulliamy. The southern limit of Bazalgatte's embankment was opposite Tinworth Street, where the road moves away from the riverside.

The stretch south of Tinworth Street was occupied by industrial and wharf premises until after World War II. These areas have subsequently been redeveloped as offices, with extensions to the embankment being constructed to a more utilitarian design than the Bazalgatte/Vulliamy stretch. Public pedestrian access to this newer embankment was only secured in the 1990s. Parts of this section of the embankment have a provisional appearance, as the landowners still have hopes for future redevelopment that could move the embankment line further into the river. However, encroachment of the tidal river bed habitat is contrary to the current planning policies of Lambeth.

Albert Embankment is also the name given to the part of the A3036 road between Vauxhall Bridge and Lambeth Bridge, where it adjoins Lambeth Palace Road and Lambeth Road. On the west side of this road adjacent to Vauxhall Bridge is the SIS Building, while on the east side nearer to Lambeth Bridge are the International Maritime Organization (IMO) building and the former headquarters of the London Fire Brigade. In the Thames opposite is London's only river fire station, home to two fireboats.

== See also ==
- Embanking of the tidal Thames
- List of eponymous roads in London
