= Swan Draw Dock =

Coordinates: 51°28′03″N 0°12′38″W

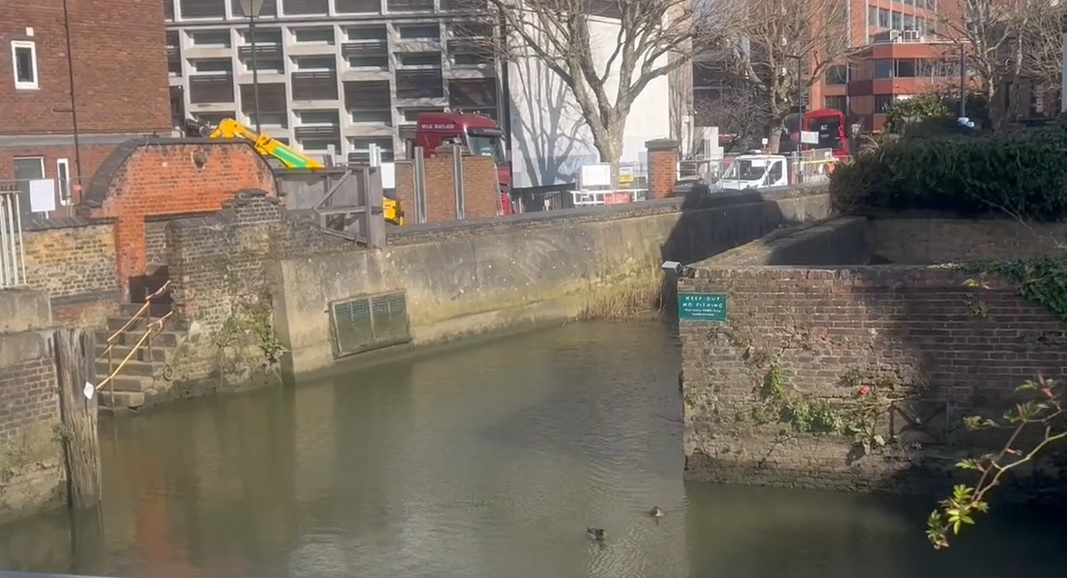
Swan Draw Dock in 2025

Swan Draw Dock is on the northern shore of the River Thames in Hammersmith and Fulham, around 100 metres east of Putney Bridge.

== History ==
A dock existed here from at least the 18th century, providing a place for boats to unload cargo for delivery to Fulham, including the unloading of Carrara marble. Swan Draw Dock derives its name from the Swan Inn, which was built or rebuilt facing the river in 1698 and situated to the west of the dock where Swanbank Court is now. It derived most of its trade from people using the ferry and later toll bridge and had its own malthouse.

The medieval ferry crossing the River Thames at Fulham left from the site of Swan Draw Dock, but this was replaced with the first bridge at Fulham built in 1727-9. At the Fulham end was a toll house called Bridge House that spanned the roadway and ensured that all those crossing paid the toll.

The toll bridge and house were closed in 1886 with a ceremony performed by the Prince of Wales (later Edward VII) – an archway was constructed to commemorate the event, but the dock remained in use. It was purchased by Fulham Vestry and redeveloped in 1888, including building a boundary wall, causeway and steps down to the river. It continued to be used as a place for barges to unload cargo as a draw dock into the 20th century. It was used by boats and barges for repair and the unloading of Carrara marble and other loads.

Following redevelopments, the dock bed (as part of the River Thames) is now owned by the Port of London Authority (PLA) while the eastern wall is owned by the adjacent Carrara Wharf estate and the western wall along the highway by the London Borough of Hammersmith and Fulham.

== Local Wildlife Site ==
The Swan Draw Dock Nature Reserve, as identified in the Unitary Development Plan, December 1994, Appendix 4.5 (Nature Conservation Areas) as part of the River Thames with its foreshore, draw docks and inlets, is not formally classified as a statutory nature reserve in England. It is classified as a Local Wildlife Site (LWS) (part of the River Thames and Tidal Tributaries LWS) and recognised as a non-statutory local conservation site.

The River Thames and Tidal Tributaries is a sprawling Metropolitan Local Wildlife Site also designated as a Site of Importance for Nature Conservation (see Site of nature conservation interest) spanning over 2,300 hectares across 18 London boroughs.

== Repair ==
The eastern and northern walls of the draw dock were deemed to be at the end of their serviceable life in 2017. To ensure the flood protection of the Fulham community, they are currently under repair by the Environment Agency. The works started in March 2025 and continue until March 2027. They form part of the Thames Estuary 2100 Programme looking to ensure that tidal walls, embankments and barriers along the Thames Estuary continue to provide adequate protection from tidal flooding.
