= James Staats Forbes =

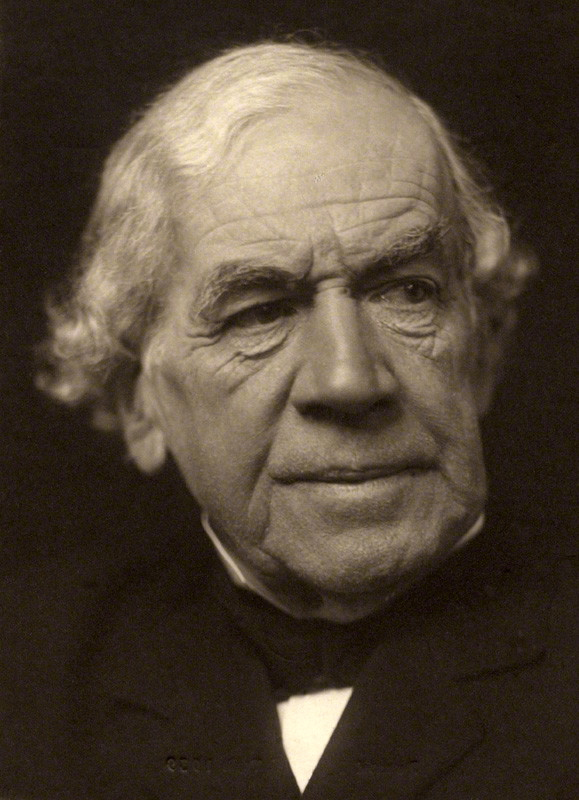
- Sepia-toned platinotype by George Charles Beresford, 1902
- Born: 7 March 1823; Aberdeen, Scotland
- Died: 5 April 1904 (aged 81); Chelsea, London
- Occupations: railway administrator, art collector

James Staats Forbes (7 March 1823 – 5 April 1904) was a Scottish railway engineer, railway administrator and art collector. He was father of the zoologist William Alexander Forbes, and the uncle of the painter Stanhope Alexander Forbes and the railway manager William Forbes.

== Life ==
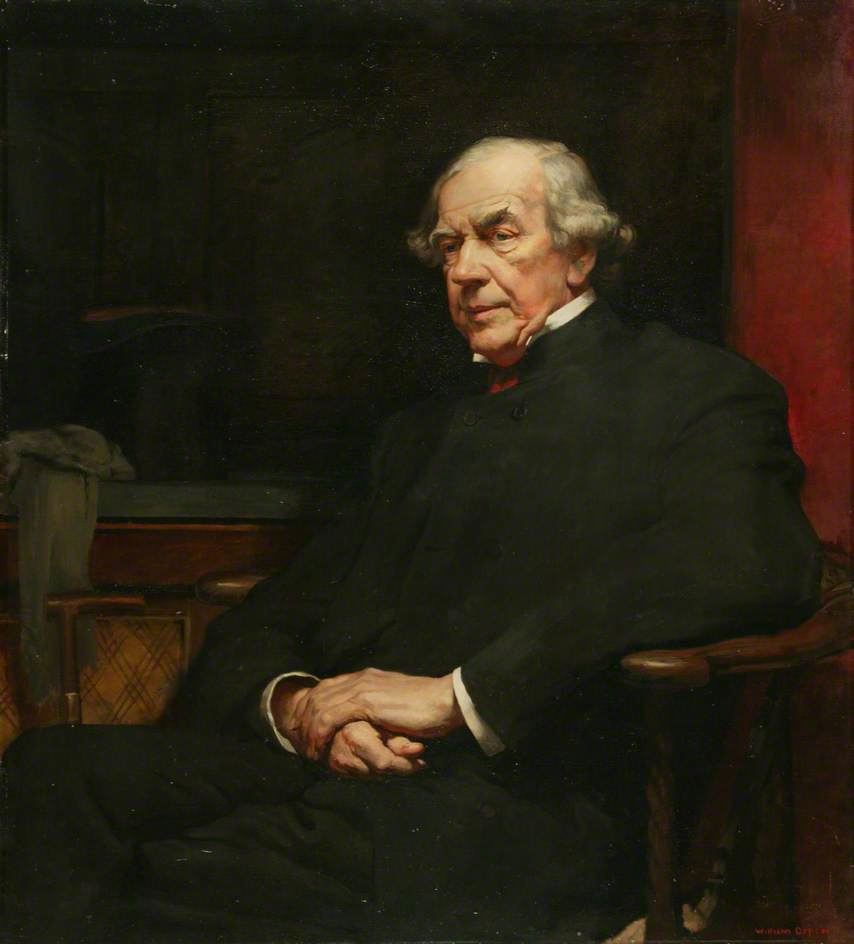
Portrait by William Orpen, 1900

Forbes was born on 7 March 1823 in Aberdeen, in Scotland, the first of six children of James Staats Forbes and his wife Ann, née Walker. He went to school in Woolwich, and in 1840 was taken on as a draughtsman in the office of Isambard Kingdom Brunel, at that time chief engineer of the Great Western Railway. In 1841 Forbes joined the Great Western as a clerk, and in a short time rose to goods manager.

On 20 August 1851, he married Ann Bennett, with whom he had two sons and two daughters; she died in 1901. He died at his London home, Garden Corner, 13 Chelsea Embankment, Chelsea, on 5 April 1904. He was buried at West Wickham in Kent five days later.

== Work ==
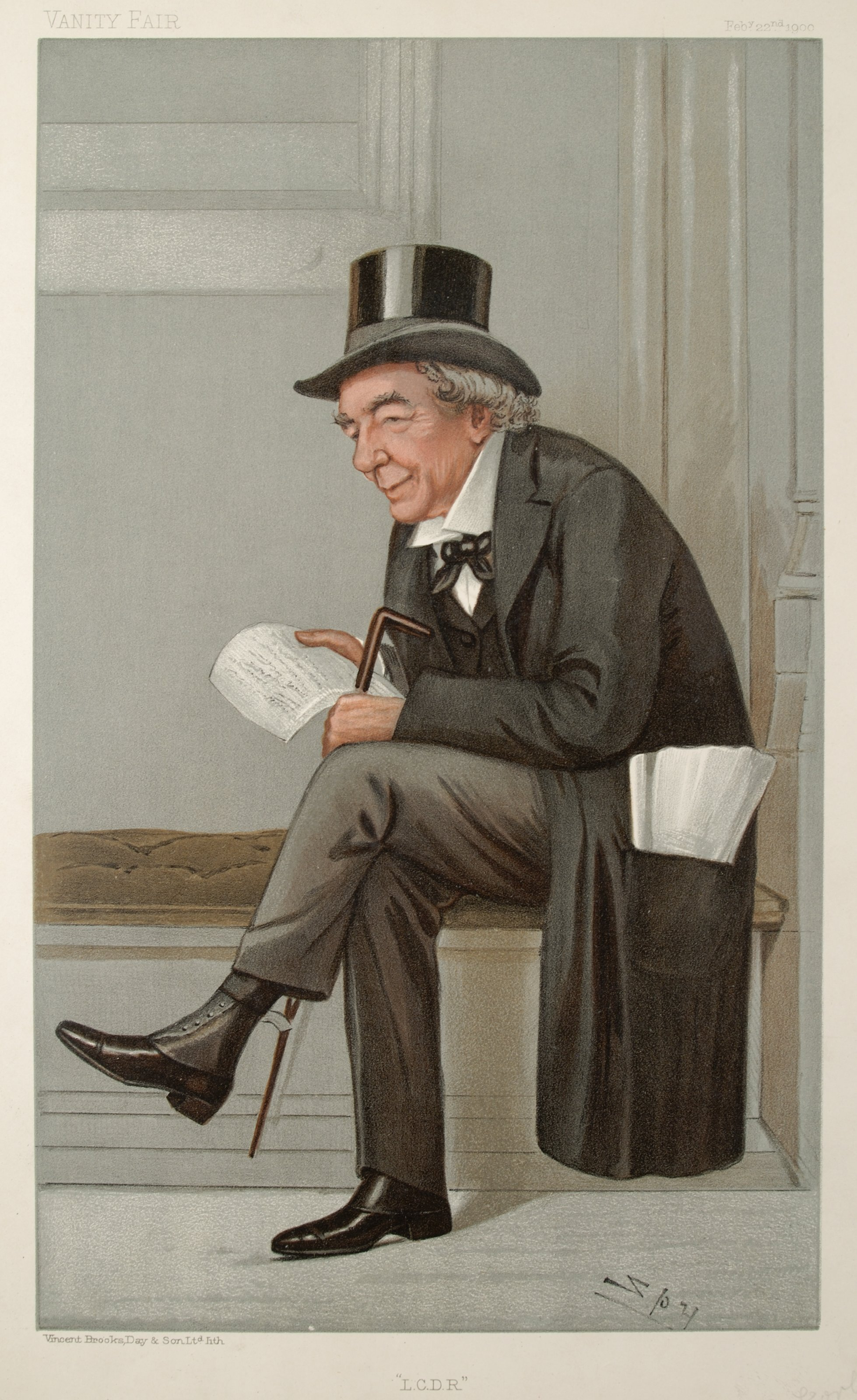
Caricature by "Spy", Vanity Fair, 22 February 1900

In 1857 Forbes went to Holland to join the Dutch–Rhenish Railway, where he soon became general manager. He was offered the position of general manager of the Great Western, but instead took over the failing London, Chatham and Dover Railway, then in receivership, where he was general manager and, from 1873, also chairman until in 1899 the company merged with the South Eastern Railway of Forbes's long-term rival, Sir Edward Watkin.

On 6 October 1870 Forbes joined the board of the Metropolitan District Railway, also close to bankruptcy at the time, and was chairman from 1872 until 1901. He held many other board posts: he was chairman of the Edison and Swan Electric Light Company and two other electric light companies, president of the National Telephone Company, a director of the Lion Fire Insurance Company, a director of the Hull and Barnsley Railway, chairman of the Whitechapel and Bow Railway, and financial adviser to the Didcot, Newbury and Southampton Railway, which was at the time also in financial difficulties.

He became an associate member of the Institution of Civil Engineers in 1865. In 1873 he stood – without success – as the Liberal candidate in a by-election in Dover.

== Art collection ==
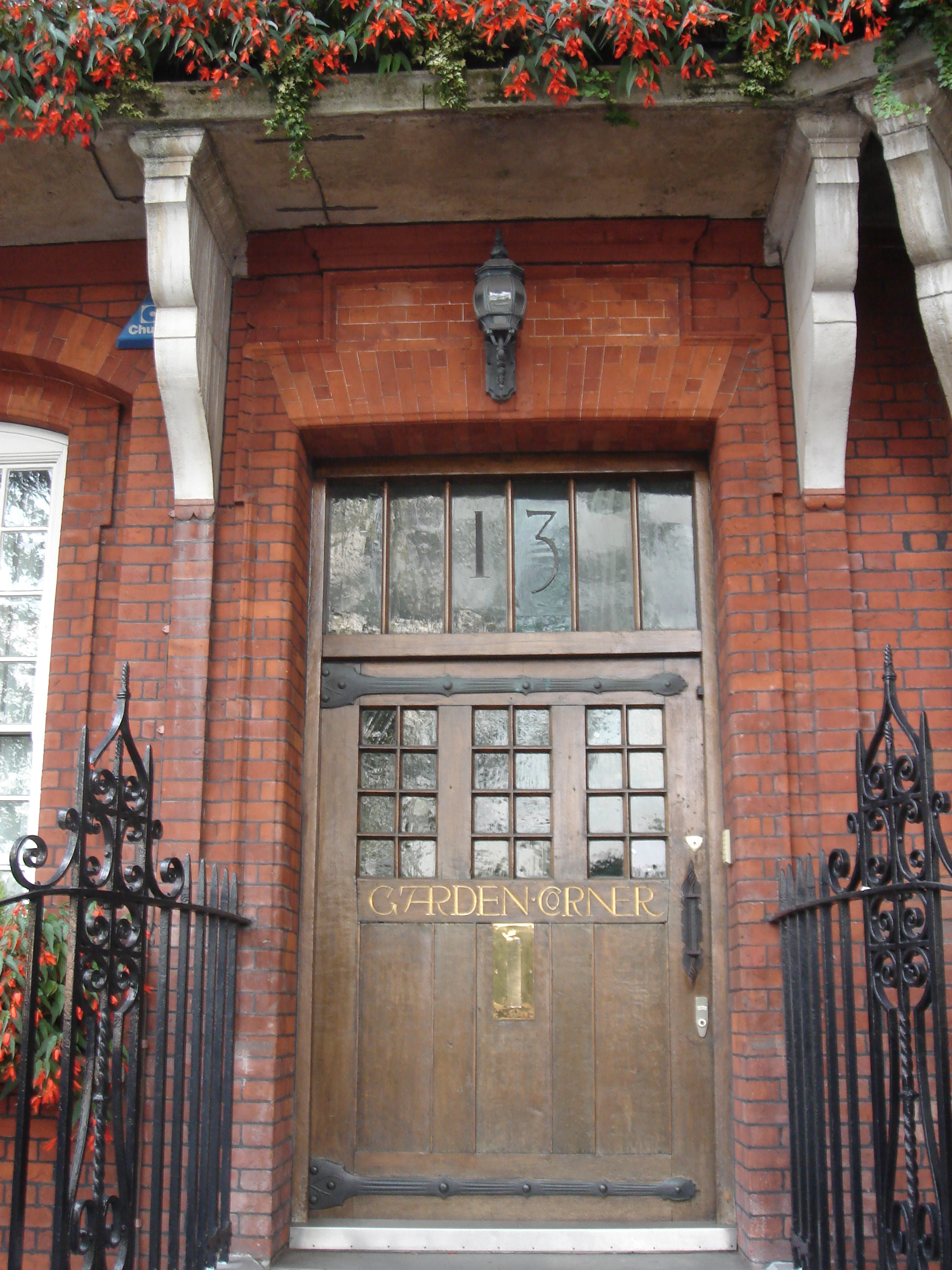
Garden Corner, on Chelsea Embankment

Forbes was a keen connoisseur of art, and built up a large collection, particularly of works of the Barbizon School, of Jean-Baptiste-Camille Corot and of nineteenth-century Dutch painters. He also had several paintings by James McNeill Whistler, including Blue and Silver: Boat Entering Pourville; Blue and Silver: Trouville; The Girl in Red; Grey and Brown: The Sad Sea Shore; Grey and Gold: High Tide at Pourville; Violet and Blue: The Red Feather and The Widow. When he died, his collection included more than four thousand pictures and drawings, with a total value estimated at £220,000 or more.

His executors chose not to hold a sale of the whole collection, which would have taken a week and might have depressed prices, but instead elected to sell it in parts. Four hundred selected works were exhibited at the Grafton Galleries in 1905. The purchase of a large proportion of these by Abraham Preyer, including works by Théophile de Bock, Johannes Bosboom, Jozef Israëls, Jacob Simon Hendrik Kever, Jacob and Willem Maris, Anton Mauve, Johannes Albert Neuhuys, Jan Hendrik Weissenbruch and others, was one of the largest art transactions then known. The exhibition also included works by Jean-Baptiste-Camille Corot, Charles-François Daubigny, Narcisse Virgilio Díaz and Jean-François Millet. A further exhibition was held in Brighton in 1908.
