= Edward Turner (chemist) =

British chemist (1796–1837)

Edward Turner FRS FRSE FRCPE (24 June 1796 – 12 February 1837) was a Jamaican-born, British medical doctor and chemist, known for his work on atomic weights, and as a populariser of the atomic theory of Dalton. He was the author of a popular chemistry textbook that was the first to incorporate chemical symbols and formulae as well as organic chemistry.

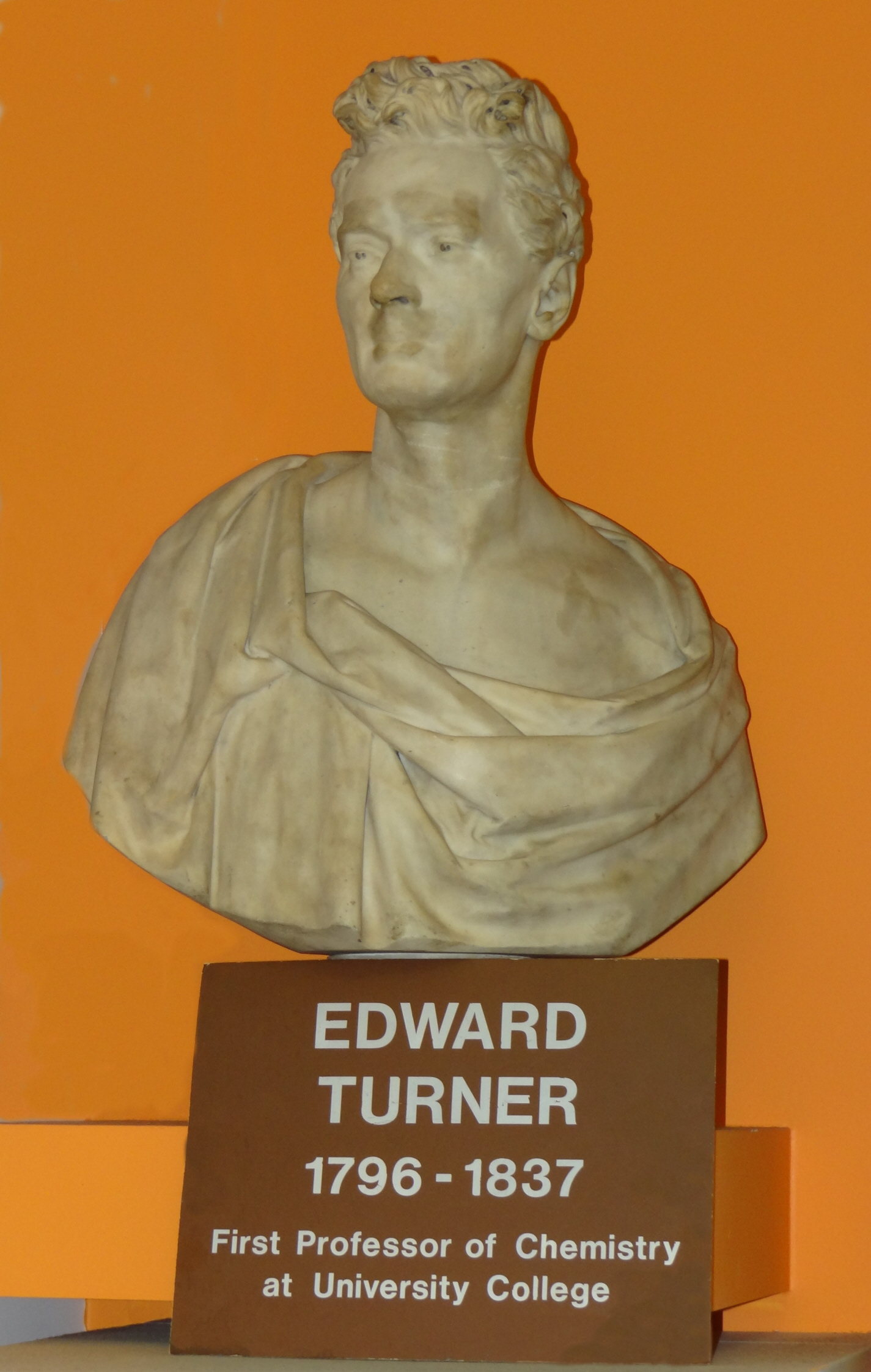
Edward Turner chemist

== Life ==
He was born at Teak Pen in Clarendon, Jamaica, the eldest of nine children of Dutton Smith Turner (1755-1816) and Mary Gale Redwar (1776-1822), who were themselves children of Jamaican plantation owners.

While he was young his parents relocated to Bath, where he received his early education at Bath Grammar School.

Together with his younger brother, William Dutton Turner (28 June 1798 - June 1858), he attended the University of Edinburgh Medical School where they graduated M.D. in 1819 and 1820.

William returned to Jamaica as a doctor in Spanish Town while Edward established a practice in Bath. After spending some time in Paris he decided to change from Medicine to experimental science and, starting in June 1821, he studied for two years at Göttingen University under Friedrich Stromeyer, working on inorganic chemistry and mineralogy.

In 1823 he returned to Edinburgh as a lecturer, where he instituted a course of lectures and laboratory sessions on chemistry; and in 1827, with the opening of University College, London, he was appointed to the new Chair of Chemistry and as a lecturer in Geology, which he continued to occupy until his death.

Turner was elected a Fellow of the Royal Society of Edinburgh in 1825, his proposer being Thomas Allan. In 1830 he was further elected a Fellow of the Royal Society of London. In 1836, he was elected as a member of the American Philosophical Society.

He died on 12 February 1837 at his London home at 38 Upper Gower St (renumbered to 117), now Camden, and was buried on 18 February 1837 at Kensal Green Cemetery (KGC 883/86/IR).

== Artistic recognition ==
A marble bust of him by Timothy Butler was placed in University College London by his pupils and is now in the Turner Laboratory in the Christopher Ingold Building in Gordon Street.

== Works ==
Turner was the author of a concise Introduction to the Study of the Laws of Chemical Combination and the Atomic Theory (1825), developed into Elements of Chemistry (1827), a work which ran through eight editions. As an investigator he published about forty papers and memoirs, a list of which was given in the Royal Society's Catalogue of Scientific Papers.

Turner succeeded in throwing light on the ores and oxides of manganese. His major work, however, was that on the atomic weights of the elements. Stimulated by Prout's hypothesis, and by the experimental work by which Thomas Thomson in 1825 sought to confirm it, Turner examined the question for himself. In two papers published in the Philosophical Transactions (1829 p. 291, and 1833 p. 523) he pointed out sources of error in Thomson's work, and obtained results which agreed with those of Berzelius. His conclusion was that Prout's hypothesis as advocated by Thomson (that all atomic weights are integer multiples of that of hydrogen) was untenable.
