= Garden Corner =

Listed house at Chelsea, London

Coordinates: 51.4841°N 0.1627°W

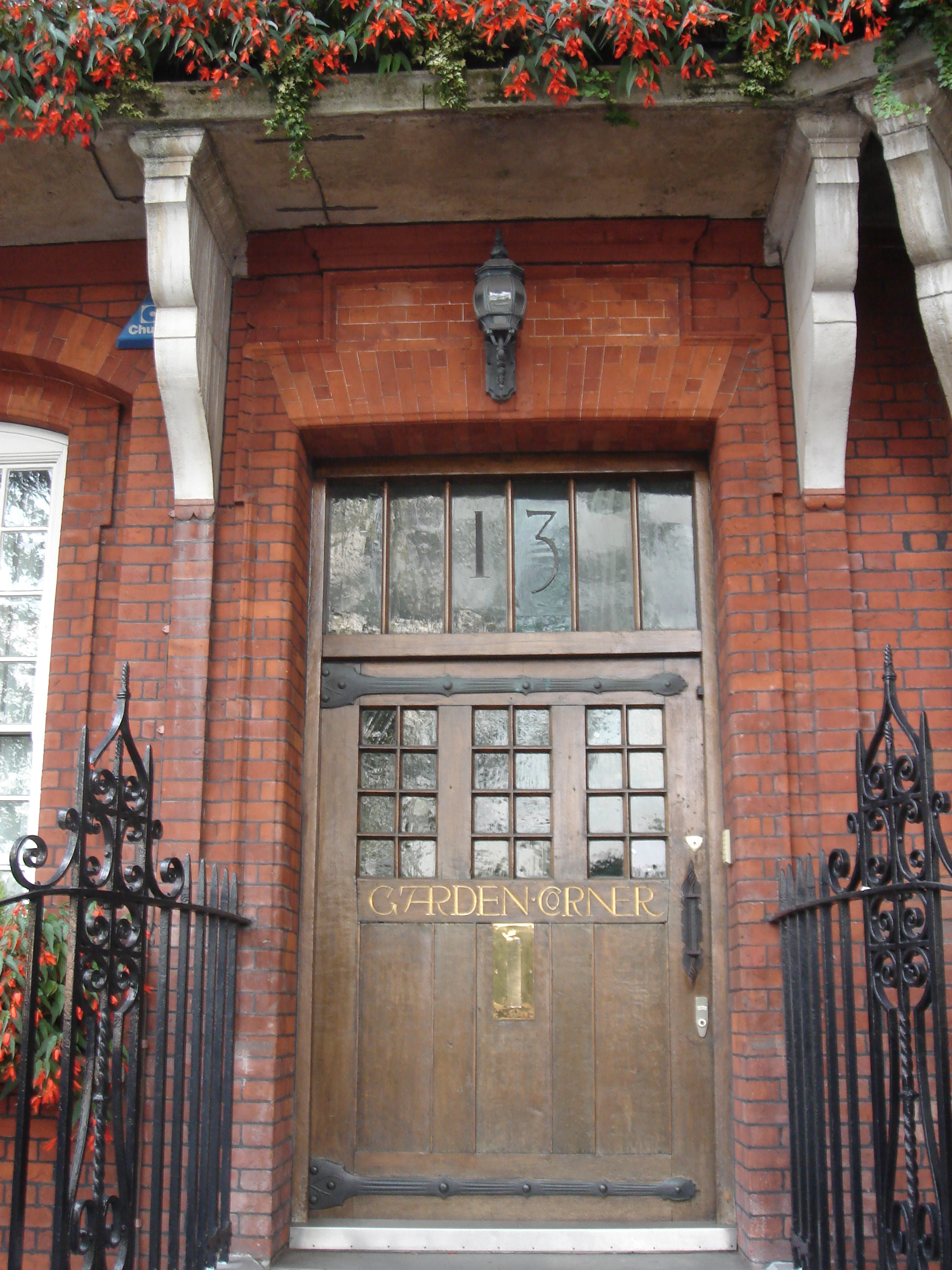
Garden Corner

Garden Corner is a Grade II listed house at 13 Chelsea Embankment, Chelsea, London.

It was built in 1879 in deep red brick in the Dutch Renaissance style on the site of the Old Swan pub, and the architect was Edward I'Anson Jr.

James Staats Forbes, the Scottish railway engineer, railway administrator and art collector lived there until his death there in 1904.

In 1906–07, the interior was substantially redesigned in the Arts and Crafts style by the architect and designer Charles Voysey, for Emslie Horniman, Liberal MP for Chelsea, anthropologist and philanthropist. According to British Listed Buildings, the interior is "widely regarded" as one of Voysey's finest interiors, both for the quality of its fixtures and fittings and for the ingenuity of its plan.

Voysey's work included lining Mrs. Horniman's second floor bedroom in oak, and ensuring that in fitting the bedstead, the writing table, the jewel-safe and the wardrobe, every inch of space was utilised. The cabinets next to the bed were fitted with sliding shelves, so that her morning teatray would be over the bed.

In the 1946 film Wanted for Murder, Garden Corner is home to Eric Portman and his mother Barbara Everest.

On 13 June 1946, it was opened as the residential Garden Corner Club, run by Lord Willoughby de Broke, Wing Commander William Herbert Wetton and another ex-RAF officer, with an emphasis on offering cars, yachts and aeroplanes for hire to members. It closed in 1949.

In September 1999, it was bought unmodernised by businessman Paul Gregg from a member of the Saudi royal family. However, despite extensive restoration, after buying a £7.5 million stake in Everton F.C., Gregg was spending most of his time in north-west England. The house was put up for sale in early 2002 for £8.5 million, but as of October 2004, the asking price had been reduced to £6.85 million.

In 2013, it was for sale for £17.95m freehold.
