= Victoria Embankment =

Road and river-walk along the north bank of the River Thames in London

Coordinates: 51°30′26″N 0°07′18″W

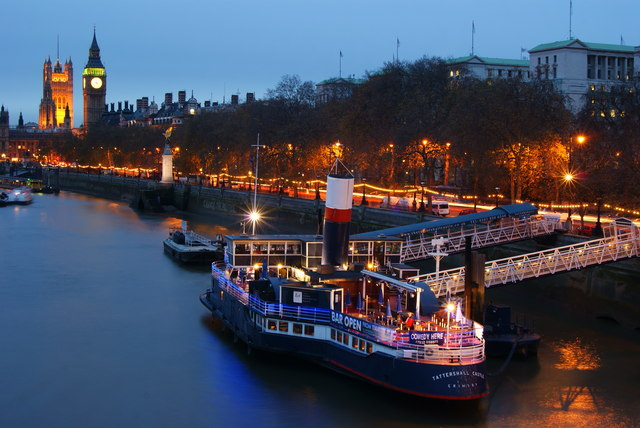
The Westminster end of Victoria Embankment and PS Tattershall Castle, pictured in 2009

Victoria Embankment is part of the Thames Embankment (the other sections are the Albert and Chelsea Embankments). It is partly a road and river-walk along the north bank of the River Thames in London, England. Built in the 1860s, it runs from the Palace of Westminster to Blackfriars Bridge in the City of London, and acts as a major thoroughfare for road traffic between the City of Westminster and the City of London. Of more pressing importance when built, it contains the low-level Northern Outfall Sewer, a strategic conduit which conveys away sewage instead of dumping it in the Thames. It also contains part of the District Line underground railway.

It is noted for several memorials, such as the Battle of Britain Monument, permanently berthed retired vessels, such as HMS President, and public gardens, including Victoria Embankment Gardens.

== History ==
=== Earlier embankments ===
The Victoria Embankment was preceded by many earlier works along the tidal Thames, including central London.

=== Construction ===
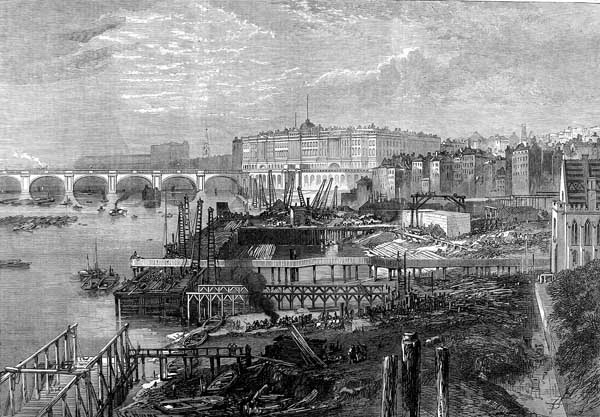
Victoria Embankment under construction in 1865

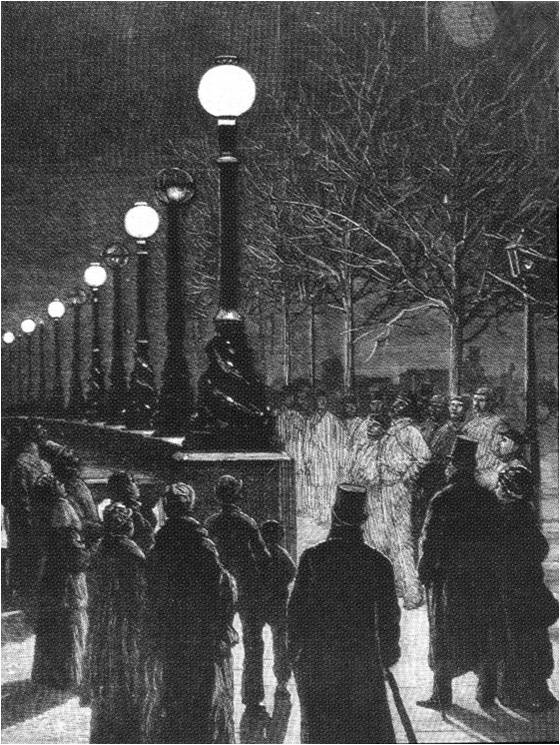
Electric light provided by Yablochkov candles in December 1878

Victoria Embankment by C.R.W. Nevinson, 1924

The Victoria Embankment was designed by civil engineer Francis Webb Sheilds, who submitted designs to a Royal Commission appointed in 1861. Following acceptance of the designs, construction was carried out by the Metropolitan Board of Works on the lines of his scheme. Construction, which started in 1865, was completed in 1870 under the direction of Joseph Bazalgette.

The Victoria Embankment was one element of a three-part work, the other two parts being the Albert Embankment, from the Lambeth end of Westminster Bridge to Vauxhall; and the Chelsea Embankment, extending from Millbank to the Cadogan Pier at Chelsea, close by Battersea Bridge. It was a project of the Metropolitan Board of Works. The contractor for the work was Thomas Brassey. The original impetus was the need to provide London with a modern sewerage system. Another major consideration was the relief of congestion on the Strand and Fleet Street.

The project involved building out on to the foreshore of the River Thames, narrowing the river. At the time, a letter to Herapath's Railway Journal stated that this would divert the flow of the river and, in time, undermine the piers of Waterloo Bridge, as subsequently happened. The construction work required the purchase and demolition of much expensive riverside property. The cut-and-cover tunnel for the District Railway was built within the Embankment and roofed over to take the roadway. The embankment was faced with granite, and penstocks, designed to open at ebb tide to release diluted sewage when rainstorms flooded the system, were built into it as a means of preventing backups in the drainage system and of periodically flushing the mud banks.

At ground level, in addition to the new roads, two public gardens were laid out. One of these backs onto the government buildings of Whitehall, and the other stretches from Hungerford Bridge to Waterloo Bridge. The gardens contain many statues, including a monument to Bazalgette. The section of the gardens between Waterloo Bridge and Charing Cross station also includes a large bandstand, where musical performances are given, and the 1626 watergate of the former York House built for the first Duke of Buckingham.

The Victoria section was the most complex of the three sections. It was much larger, more complex and more significant to the metropolis than the other two and officially opened on 13 July 1870 by the Prince of Wales and Princess Louise. When people refer to "the Embankment" they are usually referring to that portion of it. The total cost of the construction of the Victoria Embankment is estimated to be £1,260,000 and the purchase of property at £450,000. The total cost includes the cost of materials used in the construction of the embankment.

=== Issues in construction ===
Construction of the Victoria Embankment proved to be difficult because of the grandness of it. Parliament was assured that three years would be ample time to complete the project, which did not hold true.

In addition to not having a large enough labour force to complete the work on schedule, the project's architect and property appraiser were challenged in successfully securing rights to all the wharves and other property that were required for access and storage during the project's construction. They also ran into difficulty in acquiring contracts to maintain access to the steamboat landings at Westminster and Hungerford.

In addition, extra time and money were spent experimenting with a new type of cofferdam, a structure used to keep water out of the construction site, which was crucial for building along the tidal Thames.

=== Electrification ===
In December 1878 Victoria Embankment became the first street in Britain to be permanently lit by electricity. The light was provided by 20 Yablochkov candles powered by a Gramme DC generator. 16 March 1879 the system was extended to 40 lamps and 10 October to 55 lamps. Previously the street had been lit by gas, and in June 1884, gas lighting was re-established as electricity was not competitive.

== Route ==
The Victoria Embankment (part of the A3211 road) starts at Westminster Bridge, just north of the Palace of Westminster, then follows the course of the north bank, past Hungerford Bridge and Waterloo Bridge, before ending at Blackfriars Bridge in the City. Shell Mex House, the Savoy Hotel and Savoy Place are located between the Embankment and the Strand.

== Transport ==
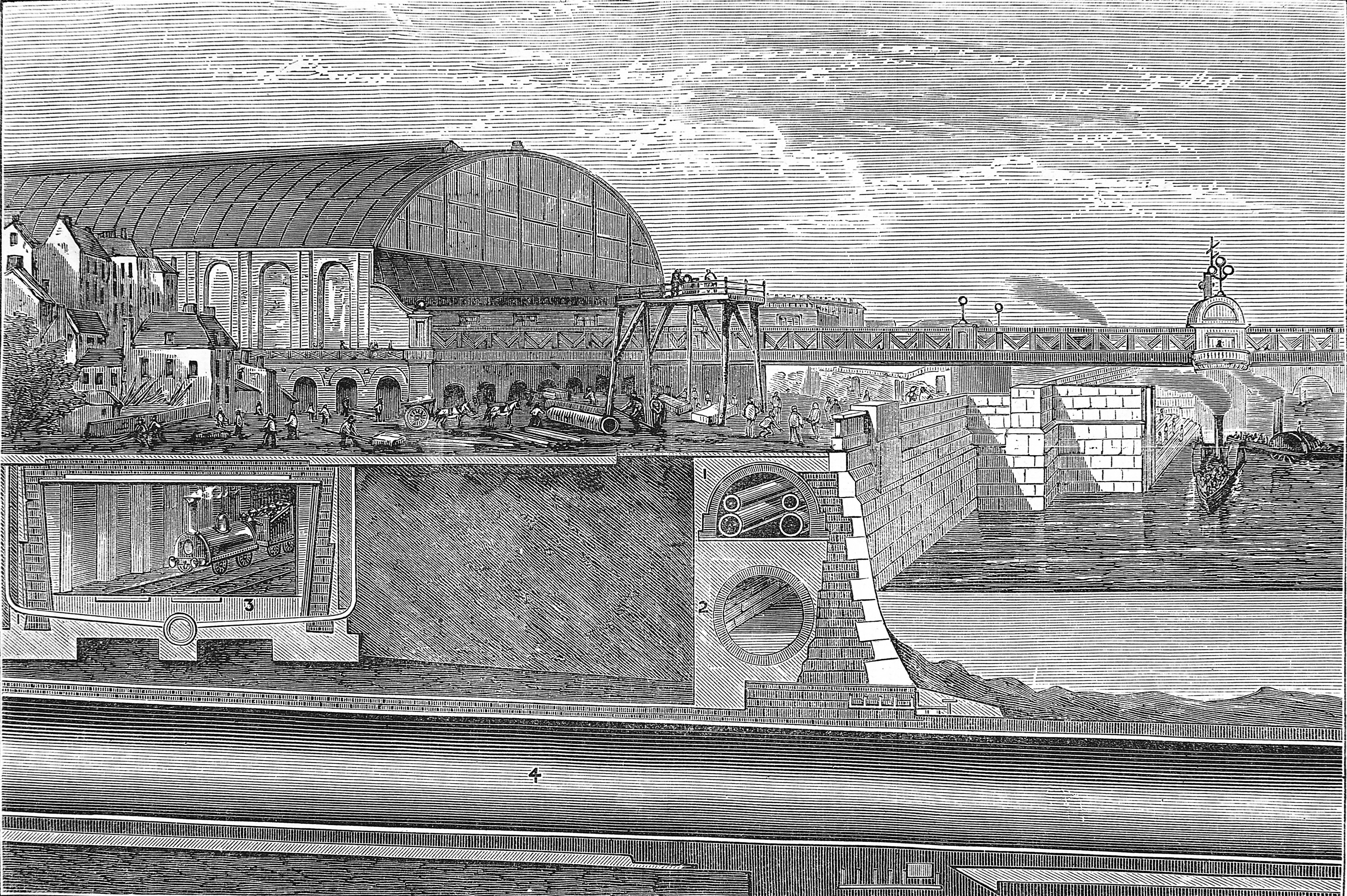
Section through Victoria Embankment at Charing Cross showing sub-surface railway

London Underground stations along Victoria Embankment are Embankment and Temple. London Buses route N550 is the only bus route along the Embankment, providing an overnight service when the tube is shut. Victoria Embankment was also the southern end of the Kingsway Tramway Subway. It was also used by trams as a loop right up until the end of the original tramway system in London in 1952.

London River Services boat services operate from Westminster Millennium Pier, Embankment Pier and Blackfriars Millennium Pier at points along Victoria Embankment. Pleasure cruises operate from Savoy Pier.

London's east–west Cycleway 3, a kerb-protected cycle track across London, runs along most of the Victoria Embankment: it opened in 2016.

== Developing as the imperial city ==
The embankments were designed as a contribution to "the appropriate, and appropriately civilized, cityscape for a prosperous commercial society." John Thwaites, the chair of the Metropolitan Board of Works, made note that the embankments were an important step in making London recognised as an exemplary imperial city, and that the embankments were the greatest public work to be taken in London. This imperial power was represented in the embankments' grandeur and could be seen in the way they controlled nature, linking the local experience of nature in London to the global rivalries of imperial powers. On the river side, new steamboat piers and landing stairs were designed for river access. Above ground were tree lined roadway and pedestrian walkways, surfaced with York paving stone and decorative gaslight posts for the top of the wall.

== Notable sites ==
Ships permanently moored by Victoria Embankment include HMS President, HQS Wellington, and PS Tattershall Castle.

Other notable attractions include the General Charles Gordon Memorial, Royal Air Force Memorial, National Submarine War Memorial, Battle of Britain Monument, Cleopatra's Needle and the modernistic Cleopatra's Kiosk.

== See also ==
- Albert Embankment
- Dragon boundary mark
- List of eponymous roads in London
- List of public art on the Victoria Embankment
- Thames Embankment
