= Draw dock =

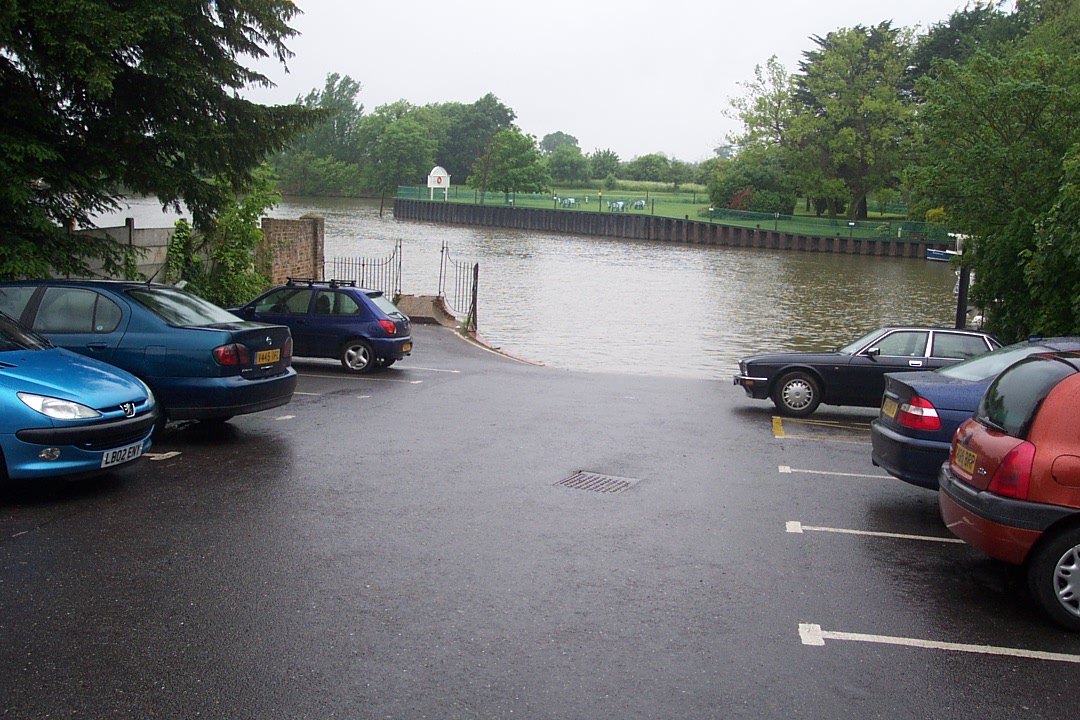
Draw dock at Raven's Ait, now a car park

A draw dock (also draw-dock) is a creek or inlet in a navigable river bank, sometimes lined, sometimes not, into which boats or barges may be drawn for repair or to land cargoes.

Some draw docks, such as the one on the right bank of the Thames at Raven's Ait in Surbiton, are simply wide slipways, others have gates, and boats float into them.
