= Thames Embankment =

Reclaimed area next to the River Thames in central London

Coordinates: 51°29′47″N 0°07′28″W

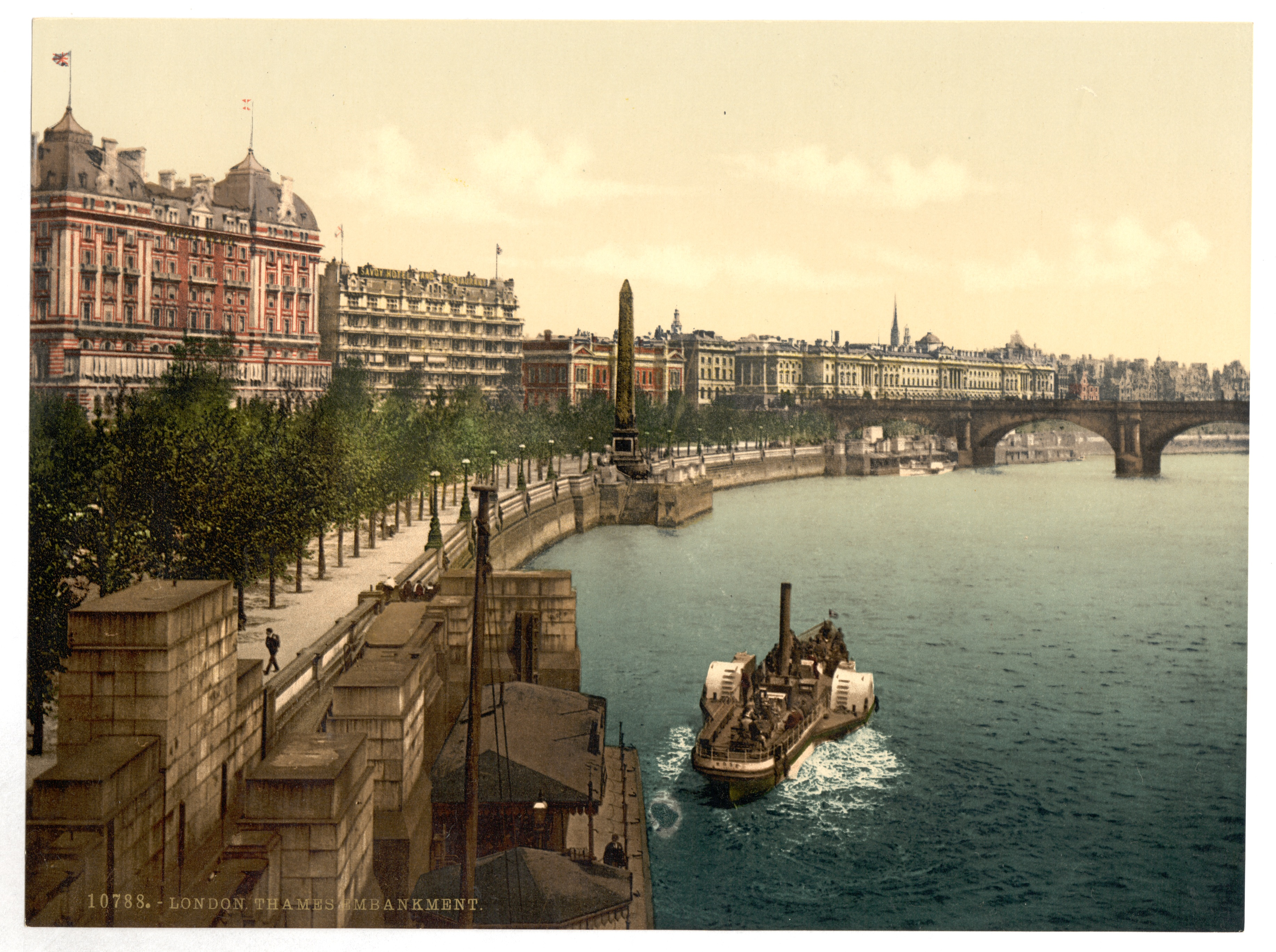
1890s postcard of the Thames Embankment

The Thames Embankment is an embankment that was built as part of the London Main Drainage (1859–1875) by the Metropolitan Board of Works, a pioneering Victorian civil engineering project which housed interceptor sewers, which collect the water from many sewer lines, as well as roads and underground railways, and also embanked the River Thames. Embankment is a form of land reclamation, and the project consisted of the Victoria Embankment and Chelsea Embankment on the north side and the Albert Embankment on the south. Designed by the Chief Engineer Joseph Bazalgette, it modernised London's infrastructure, improving public health, mobility, and the image of the British capital.

== History ==
There had been a long history of failed proposals to embank the Thames in central London. Embankments along the Thames were first proposed by Christopher Wren in the 1660s, then in 1824 former soldier and aide to George IV, Sir Frederick Trench suggested an embankment known as 'Trench's Terrace' from Blackfriars to Charing Cross. Trench brought a bill to Parliament which was blocked by river interests.

In the 1830s, the painter John Martin promoted a version, as realised later, to contain an intercepting sewer. In January 1842 the City Corporation backed a plan designed by James Walker but which was dropped due to government infighting. The government itself built the Chelsea Embankment in 1854 from Chelsea Hospital to Millbank.

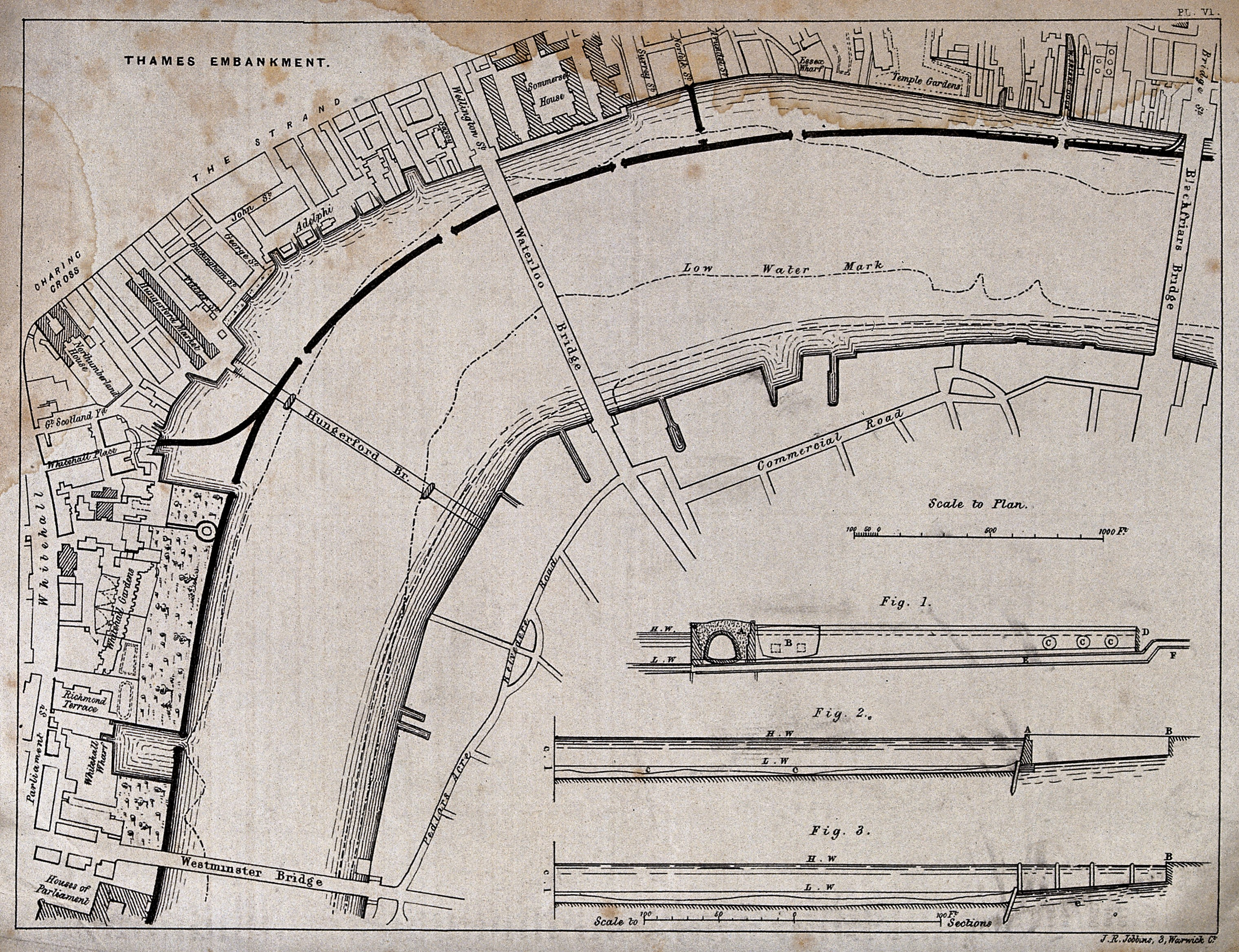
A plan of the Thames Embankment

Started in 1862, the Victoria Embankment starting from Millbank on the main, north (or "left" bank) was primarily designed by Sir Joseph Bazalgette with architectural work on the embankment wall and river stairs by Charles Henry Driver. It incorporates the main low level interceptor sewer from the then limits of west London's growth, and an underground railway over which a wide road and riverside walkway were built and run today, shored up by the sturdy retaining wall along the tidal River Thames (the Tideway). Five main interceptor tunnels with a total length of 131 km drained over 3,200 km of smaller collector sewers. Four large steam-powered pumping stations were incorporated, strategically placed to elevate the sewage so it would continue to flow eastwards under gravity. In total, Bazalgette's scheme reclaimed 22 acres (0.089 km^{2}) of land from the river.

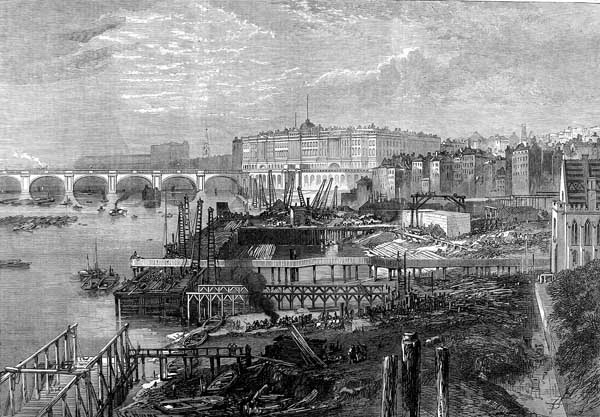
The Victoria Embankment under construction in 1865. Hungerford Bridge can be seen in the background.

Much of the granite used in the projects was brought from Lamorna Cove in Cornwall. The quarried stone was shaped into blocks on site before being loaded on to barges and transported up the English Channel into the Thames.

From Battersea Bridge in the west, it includes Cheyne Walk, Chelsea Embankment, Grosvenor Road, Millbank and Victoria Tower Gardens.

Beyond the Houses of Parliament, it is named Victoria Embankment as it stretches to Blackfriars Bridge; this stretch incorporates part of the shared District/Circle Line bi-directional tunnel of the London Underground and passes Shell Mex House and the Savoy Hotel. It likewise incorporates gardens and open space, here at their greatest, and collectively known as the Embankment Gardens, which provide a peaceful oasis in the heart of Central London. The gardens include many statues, including a memorial with a bust of Bazalgette.

The smaller and shorter Albert Embankment is on the south side of the river, opposite the Millbank section of the Thames Embankment. It was created by Bazalgette for the Metropolitan Board of Works and built by William Webster between July 1866 and November 1869.

Some parts of the Embankment were rebuilt in the 20th century due to wartime bomb damage or natural disasters such as the 1928 Thames flood.

The Thames and Albert embankments are but a fraction of the 200 miles of walls that prevent the Thames from flooding adjoining lands, and which were begun in the Middle Ages.

== See also ==
- Esplanade/promenade
- London sewerage system
  - Combined sewers
  - Thames Tideway Scheme
- District line (London Underground)
- Former subterranean rivers of London
- W.T. Stead
