= Chelsea Embankment =

Reclaimed area along the bank of the River Thames in London, England

Coordinates: 51.4840°N 0.1620°W

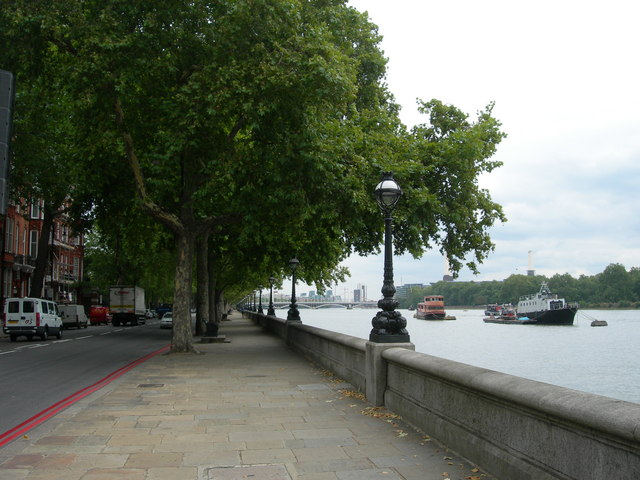
Chelsea Embankment

Chelsea Embankment is part of the Thames Embankment, a road and walkway along the north bank of the River Thames in central London, England.

The western end of Chelsea Embankment, including a stretch of Cheyne Walk, is in the Royal Borough of Kensington and Chelsea; the eastern end, including Grosvenor Road and Millbank, is in the City of Westminster. Beneath the road lies the main low-level interceptor sewer taking waste water from west London eastwards towards Beckton.

Chelsea Bridge and Albert Bridge are to the south. Royal Hospital Chelsea is to the north. Sloane Square is the closest tube station, located to the north.

== History ==
The embankment was completed to a design by Joseph Bazalgette and was part of the Metropolitan Board of Works' grand scheme to provide London with a modern sewage system. It was opened on 9 May 1874 by Prince Alfred, Duke of Edinburgh.

In 2025, a new section of the embankment, designed by architects Hawkins\Brown with an installation by Florian Roithmayer, was opened to the public as part of the Thames Tideway Tunnel project.

=== Roper's Garden ===
Between Chelsea Old Church and Crosby Hall is a small public park, Roper's Garden. In the Tudor period, the site was an orchard belonging to Sir Thomas More who gave it to his daughter, Margaret as part of her settlement on her marriage to William Roper, from whom the garden's name derives. Heavily built up in the 19th century, the majority of buildings on the site were destroyed by a parachute mine dropped by the Luftwaffe in April 1941. In the post-war period, it was determined to redevelop the site as a small park. Designs were produced by Peter Shepheard and the garden opened in 1964. The garden contains two sculptures, Awakening, an early work by Gilbert Ledward dating from 1915; (Note: Gilbert Ledward's Awakening is a Grade II listed structure.) and an unfinished nude of 1950 by Jacob Epstein, who had a studio near the site. The garden is listed at Grade II on the Register of Historic Parks and Gardens of Special Historic Interest in England.

== Notable buildings ==
- Garden Corner, 13 Chelsea Embankment - Grade II* listed
- Swan House, 17 Chelsea Embankment - Grade II* listed

== Local streets ==
- Chelsea Bridge Road
- Royal Hospital Road
- West Road
- Tite Street

== Gallery ==
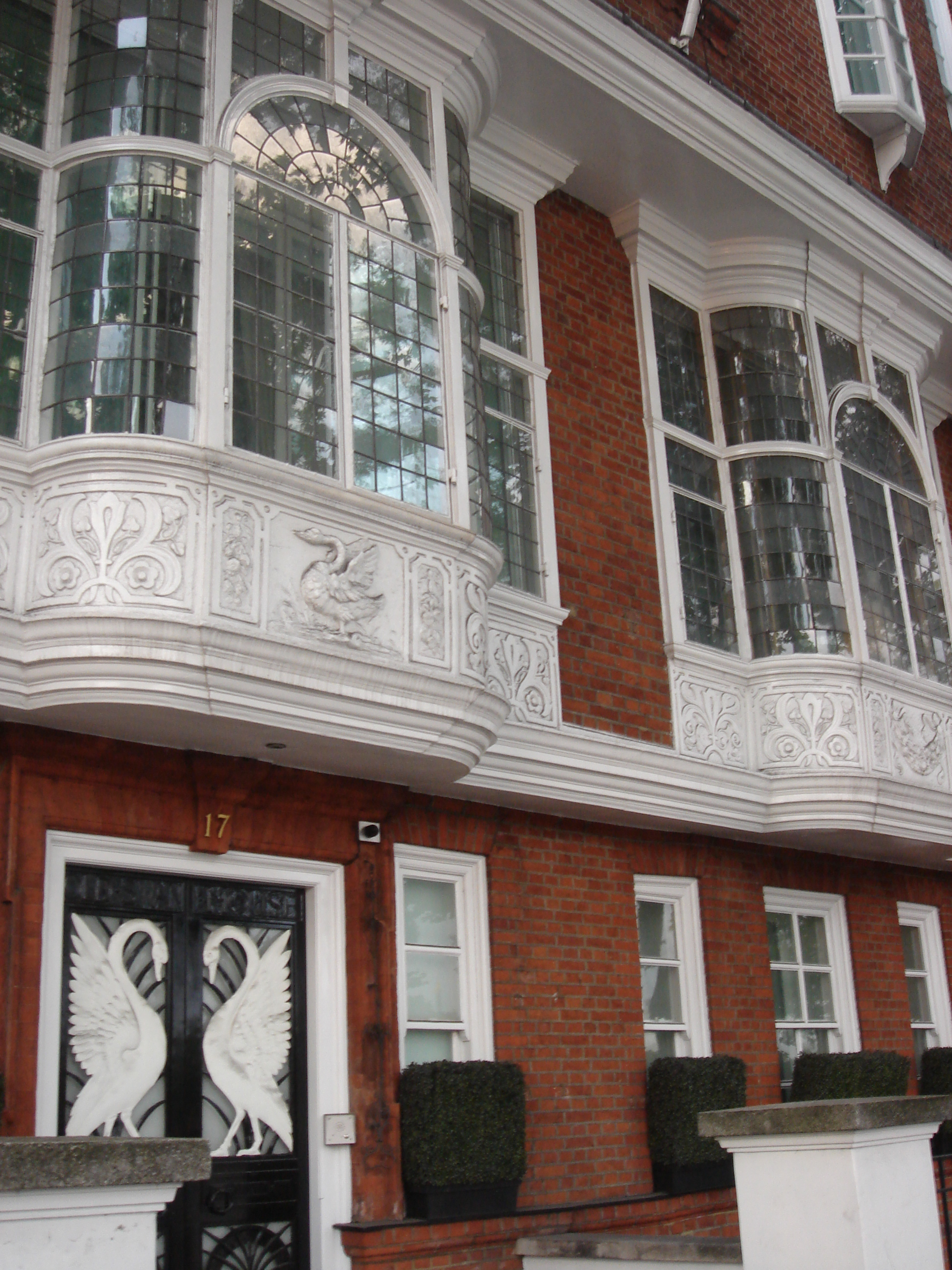
Swan House

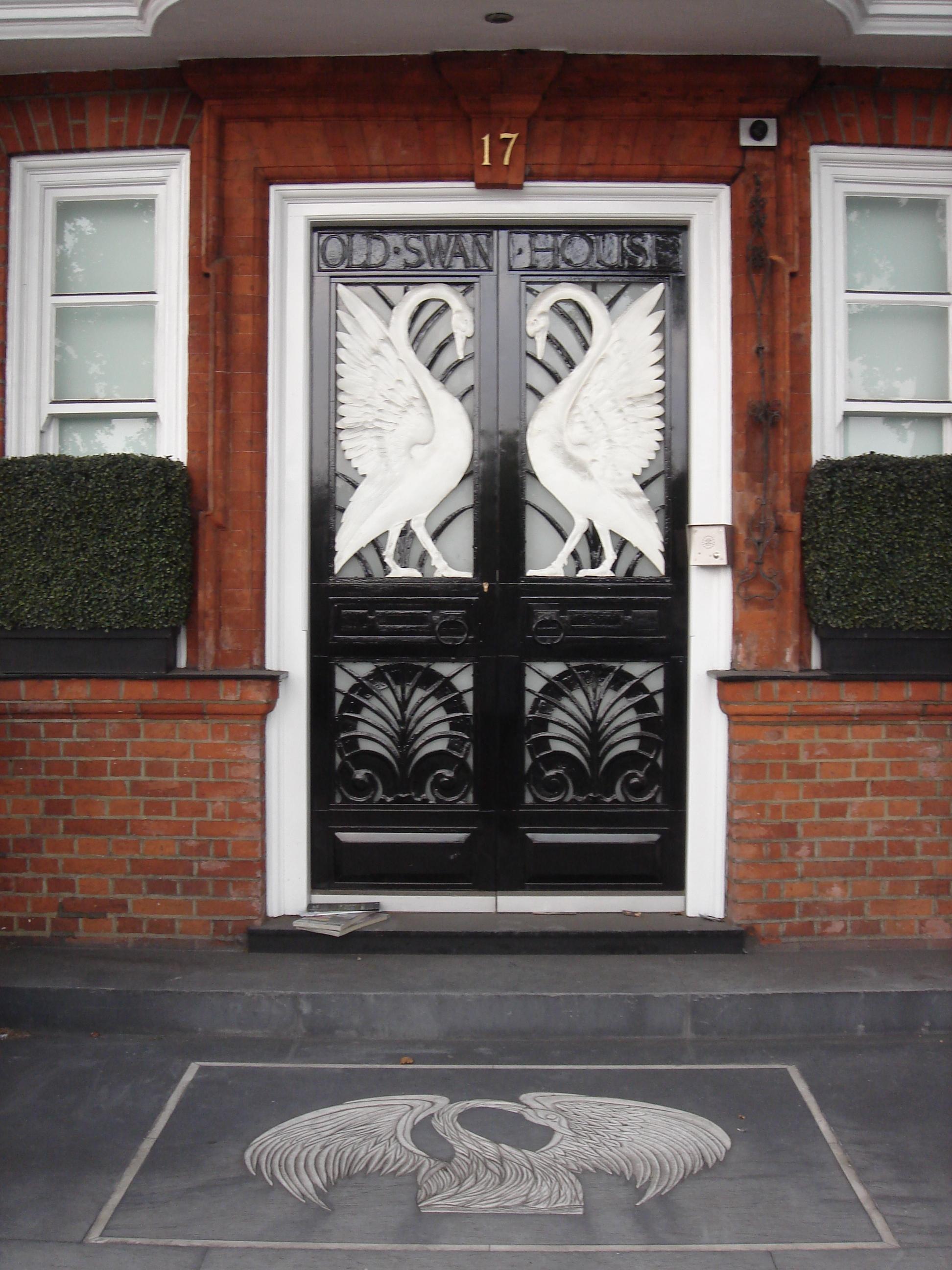
Swan House

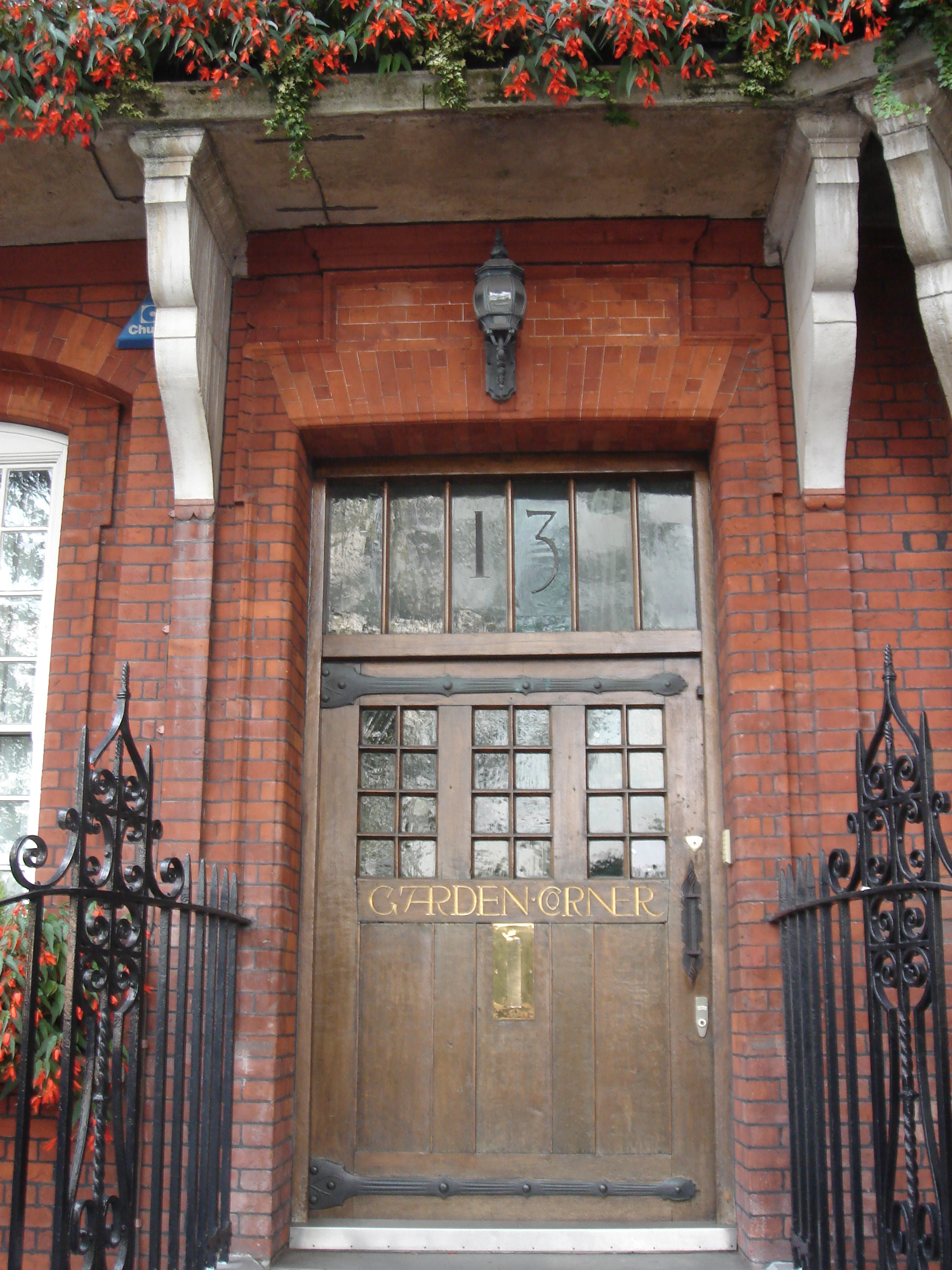
Garden Corner

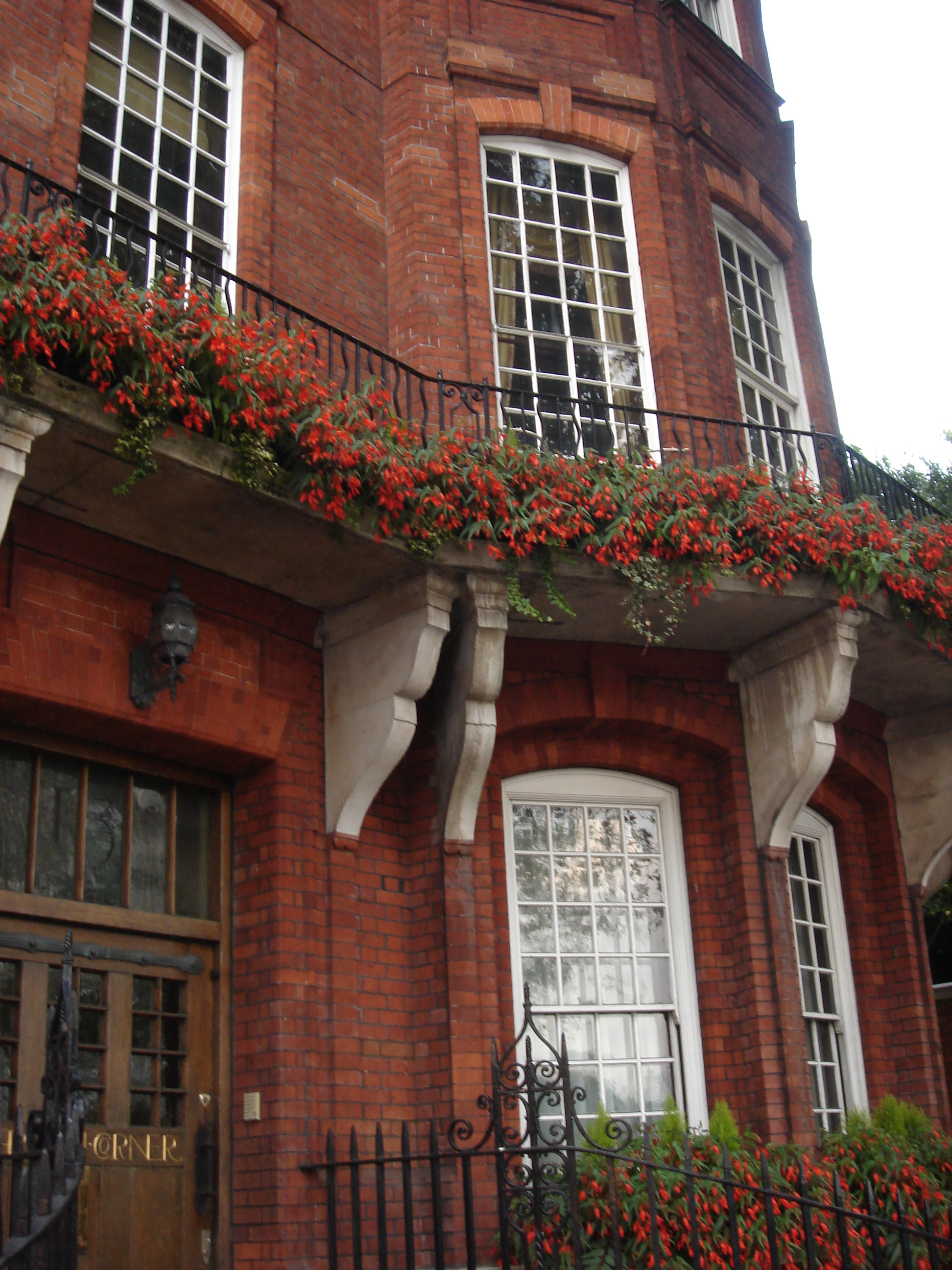
Garden Corner

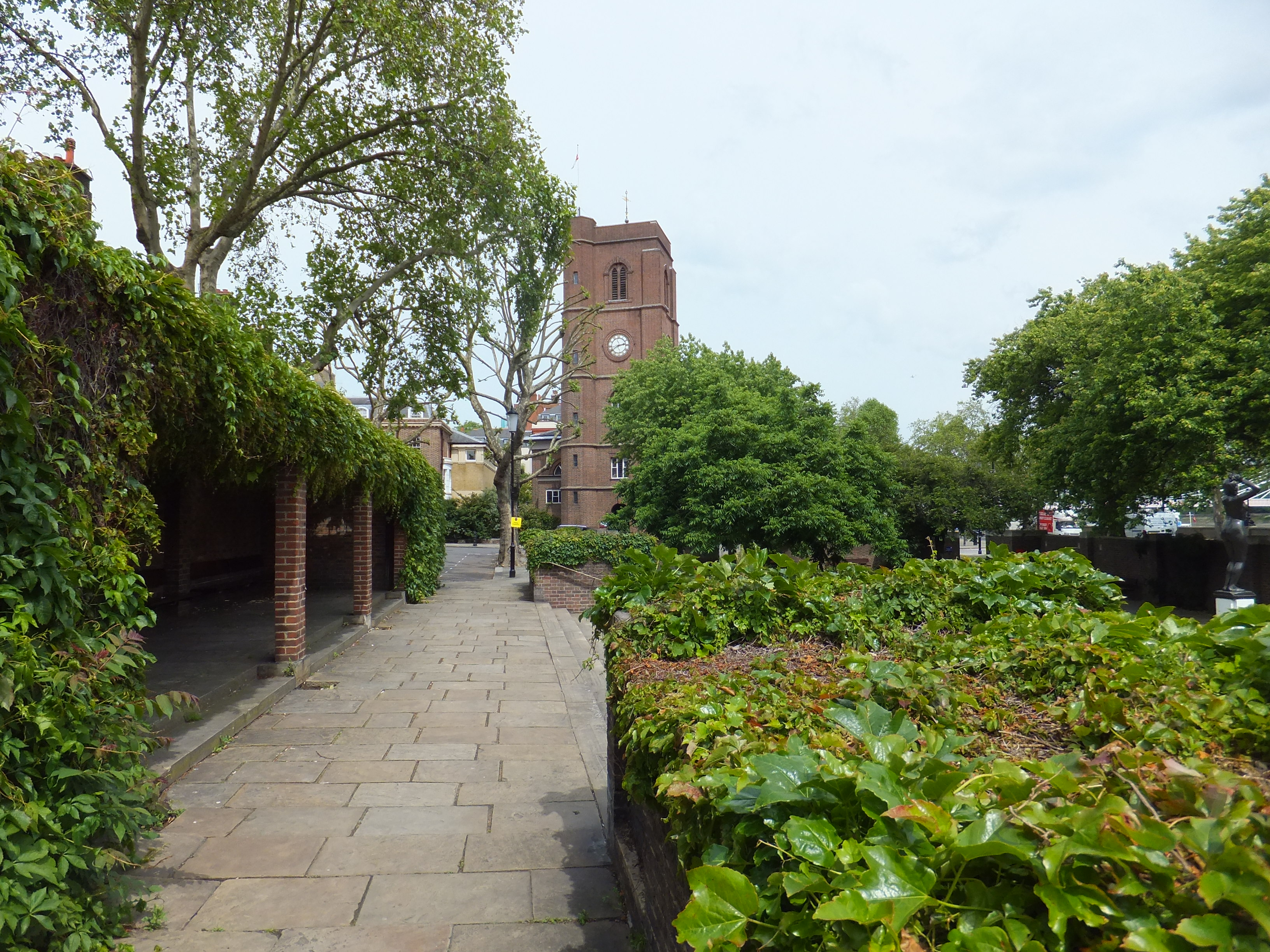
Roper's Garden
