= Meredith Frampton =

British artist (1894–1984)

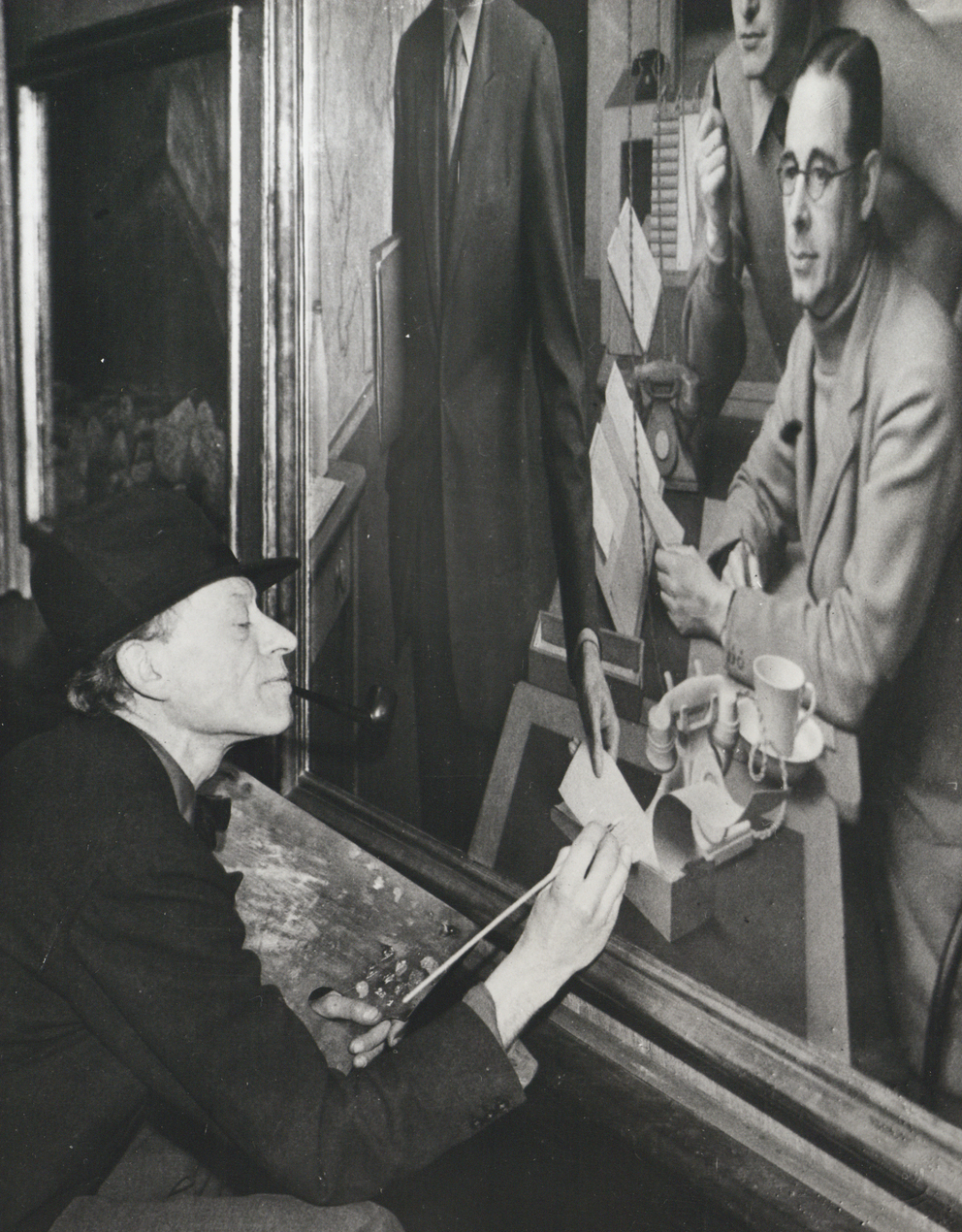
- Born: 17 March 1894; St John's Wood, London, England
- Died: 16 September 1984 (aged 90); Mere, Wiltshire, England
- Education: St John's Wood School of Art; Royal Academy Schools
- Known for: Portrait painting

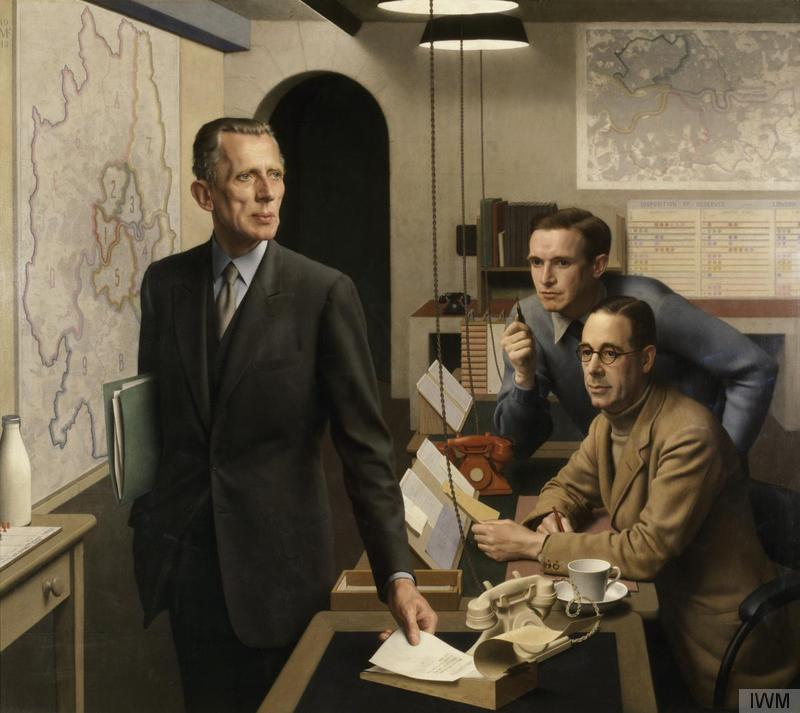
Sir Ernest Gowers, KCB, KBE, Senior Regional Commissioner for London, Lt Col AJ Child, OBE, MC, Director of Operations and Intelligence, and KAL Parker Deputy Chief Administrative Officer in the London Regional Civil Defence Control Room (1943) (Art.IWM ART LD2905)

George Vernon Meredith Frampton RA (17 March 1894 – 16 September 1984) was a British painter and etcher, successful as a portraitist in the 1920s–1940s. His artistic career was short and his output limited because his eyesight began to fail in the 1950s, but his work is on display at the National Portrait Gallery, Tate Gallery and Imperial War Museum.

== Biography ==
=== Early life ===
Frampton was born in the St John's Wood area of London and was the only child of the sculptor Sir George Frampton and his wife, the painter Christabel Cockerell. Frampton was educated at Westminster School and after some months learning to speak French in Geneva he enrolled at the St John's Wood School of Art. He went on to attend the Royal Academy Schools between 1912 and 1915, where he won both a first prize and a silver medal.

=== World War I ===
During the First World War, Frampton served in the British Army on the Western Front with a field survey unit, sketching enemy trenches, and also worked on the interpretation of aerial photographs. After the war Frampton resumed his artistic career and established himself as among the most highly regarded of British painters during the period. Between 1920 and 1945 he exhibited at the Royal Academy nearly every year, showing a total of thirty-two paintings there. Frampton was an early member of the Society of Graphic Art and exhibited there in 1921. In 1925 he was elected a member of the Art Workers Guild. In 1934 he was elected an Associate of the Royal Academy and in 1942 became a full member of the Academy. Frampton painted portraits of the Duke of York, who was to become King George VI, academics and scientists, and a series of full length portraits of women from fashionable society. He would often spend an entire year working on a single painting.

Frampton painted in smooth colours without visible brushstrokes, achieving a look of almost photographic realism. Most of his paintings were commissions, but a notable exception was Portrait of A Young Woman, which Frampton showed at the Royal Academy in 1935 and which was purchased for the Tate. Frampton had several of the objects in the painting made specially for the painting and his mother made the dress worn by the model, Margaret Austin-Jones. She modelled for him again in one of his most famous works, A Game of Patience (1937), now hanging in the Ferens Art Gallery in Hull.

=== World War II and later life ===
During World War Two, Frampton received two commissions from the War Artists' Advisory Committee, WAAC. One was intended for the Admiralty, but a suitable subject was not found and the painting was never made. Frampton's other WAAC commission was for a portrait of Sir Ernest Gowers, which became a triple portrait of Gowers and his colleagues in their underground control room in Kensington.

In 1953 Frampton requested that the Royal Academy place him on its list of retired members. His eyesight had begun to worsen, convincing him that he could no longer paint to his previous high standard and with such meticulous detail. With his wife he moved to a hilltop house overlooking Monkton Deverill in Wiltshire. Frampton had designed the property in the 1930s and for the rest of his life he worked on improving and maintaining this house, which included his own furniture and clock designs.

For many years Frampton's art was rarely shown in public and he was largely forgotten. However, he lived to see his retrospective at the Tate in 1982. It was his first one-man show and greatly restored his standing.

=== Posthumous usage ===
In 2016 Penguin Classics began employing a series of Frampton's paintings for new editions of the complete works of Russian writer Vladimir Nabokov.
