= Dr Barnardo's Memorial =

Public sculpture by George Frampton

Memorial to Dr Barnardo
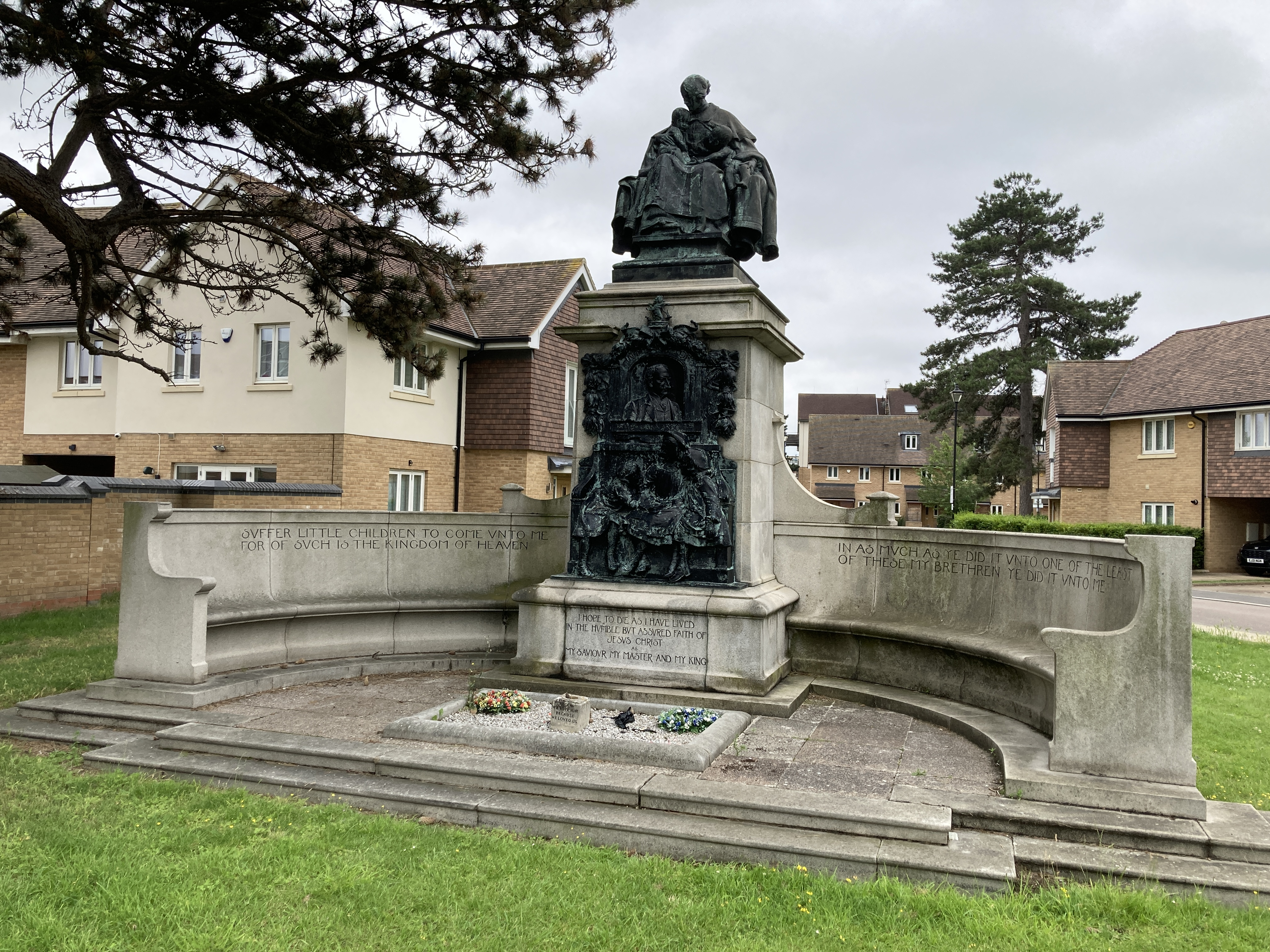
- Artist: George Frampton
- Completion date: 1908
- Type: Sculpture
- Medium: Bronze
- Subject: Thomas John Barnardo
- Dimensions: 4.8 m (16 ft)
- Location: London; 51.586°N 0.0843°E

Listed Building – Grade II*
- Official name: Dr Barnardo's Memorial at Barnardo's
- Designated: 22 February 1979
- Reference no.: 1081001

The Memorial to Dr Barnardo by George Frampton, at Barkingside in the London Borough of Redbridge, commemorates the founder of the Barnardo's children's charity. Born in Dublin into a Sephardic Jewish family, Thomas John Barnardo moved to the East End of London in 1866 where he established a chain of orphanages that developed into the Barnardo's charity. He died in 1905 and, in a move unusual for the time, was cremated; his ashes were interred in front of Cairn's House, the original building of his Barkingside children's village. In 1908, a memorial was raised on the site, the sculpture being undertaken by George Frampton, who worked without a fee. The memorial was designated a Grade II listed structure in 1979 and upgraded to II* in 2010.

== Dr Barnado ==
Thomas John Barnado was born in Dublin in 1845. Moving to London in 1866 to train as a doctor, he was profoundly affected by the child poverty he witnessed in the East End of London and, in 1867, opened his first ragged school. By the late 1870s, Barnado, working with his wife Syrie, had established over 50 orphanages and schools for poor children in London, including his Girls' Village at Barkingside, in what is now the London Borough of Redbridge. The Barkingside development followed the concept of a 'village' environment, rather than an institutional approach, first established at children's homes at Farningham, Kent, in 1865, and at Princess Mary's Village Home for Little Girls at Addlestone, Surrey, in 1870. The Barkingside village was also originally the Barnados' home, which they received as a wedding present. Barnado died in 1905 at his home in Surbiton and, following a funeral attended by very large crowds and a subsequent cremation, his ashes were interred at Barkingside.

== Architecture and description ==
The sculpture was undertaken by George Frampton, later famous for his statue of Peter Pan in Kensington Gardens and his memorial to W. S. Gilbert on the Victoria Embankment. Frampton donated his design without charge. The memorial forms an exedra, with a large, semi-circular, stone seat flanking the central plinth. The base has figures in bronze of three children, with a bust of Barnado above that, and culminates in a figure of a woman, representing Charity, embracing two further children. The base is inscribed with a quotation from Barnado's will: 'I HOPE TO DIE AS I HAVE LIVED/ IN THE HUMBLE BUT ASSURED FAITH OF/ JESUS CHRIST/ AS/ MY SAVIOUR, MY MASTER AND MY KING'. The walls that form the seat are also inscribed, to the left: 'SUFFER LITTLE CHILDREN TO COME UNTO ME/ FOR OF SUCH IS THE KINGDOM OF HEAVEN'; and to the right: 'IN AS MUCH AS YE DID IT UNTO ONE OF THE LEAST/ OF THESE MY BRETHREN YE DID IT UNTO ME'. A small memorial set into the base commemorates Syrie Barnado, who died in 1944.

The memorial, described in Pevsner as "outstanding", was unveiled in 1908 by the Duchess of Albany. It was listed at Grade II in 1979, and upgraded to Grade II* in 2010.

== Sources ==
- Cherry, Bridget; O'Brien, Charles; Pevsner, Nikolaus (2007). London 5: East. The Buildings of England. New Haven, US, London, UK: Yale University Press. ISBN 9780300107012.
- Darke, Jo (1991). The Monument Guide to England and Wales: A National Portrait in Bronze and Stone. London: MacDonald and Co. OCLC 1008240876.
