= Christabel Cockerell =

British painter (1864–1951)

Christabel Cockerell, Lady Frampton
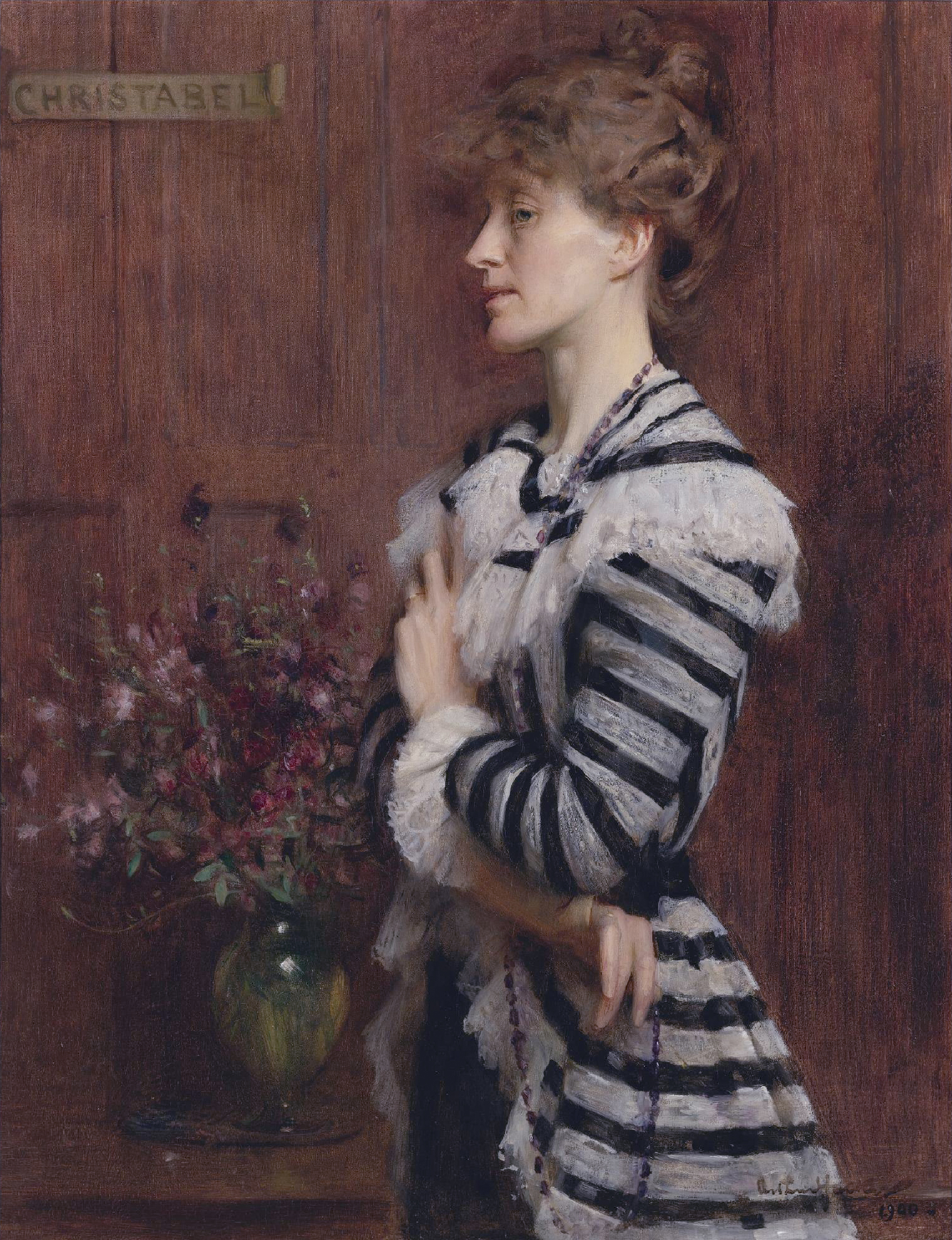
- Christabel Cockerell, Lady Frampton, by Arthur Hacker
- Born: Christabel Annie Cockerell; 1864
- Died: 1951 (aged 86-87)
- Other name: Lady Frampton
- Occupation: Painter
- Spouse: Sir George Frampton (m. 1893; died 1928)
- Children: Meredith Frampton

Christabel Annie Cockerell, Lady Frampton (baptized 21 October 1864 – 18 March 1951) was a British painter of children, portraits and landscapes.

== Biography ==
Cockerell was born in 1863, daughter of George Russell Cockerell of London, and trained at the Royal Academy Schools from 1882, where she met her future husband, the sculptor George Frampton. They married in April 1893 and their son, Meredith Frampton was born on 17 March 1894. She exhibited work at the Royal Academy from 1885, and continued until 1910, always under her maiden name.

Her husband was knighted in 1908 and she became Lady Frampton, but continued to exhibit her art using her maiden name.

In 1910 they moved to a new house designed by him at 90 Carlton Hill, St John's Wood, London, which included a studio for each of them. Her studio in the house was described as "a perfect painting room in which comfort and utility are happily combined", with numerous pictures on the walls, and the carpet from the studio of Leighton. The house was featured in a 1910 article "Recent Designs in Domestic Architecture" in The Studio, complete with photographs, including one of the interior of Cockerell's studio. The exterior of the house is almost unchanged today.

Some insight into the household can be gleaned from an advertisement in The Times in 1919, in which she seeks a "Cook-General and House-Parlourmaid" for a "comfortable place in St. John’s Wood", and describes the household as comprising a family of three and three maids.

Cockerell modelled occasionally for her husband: his Mother and Child shows her with their infant son Meredith, and was exhibited at the 1897 Venice Biennale and the Paris Exposition Universelle in 1900. Her husband also featured in her work: one of her smaller paintings shows him sitting by a window, working on his sculpture, watched by his young son.

Her husband died on 21 May 1928, and in 1930 she presented several bronzes to Camberwell Borough Council's art gallery in his memory, because of his affection for Camberwell.

== Works ==
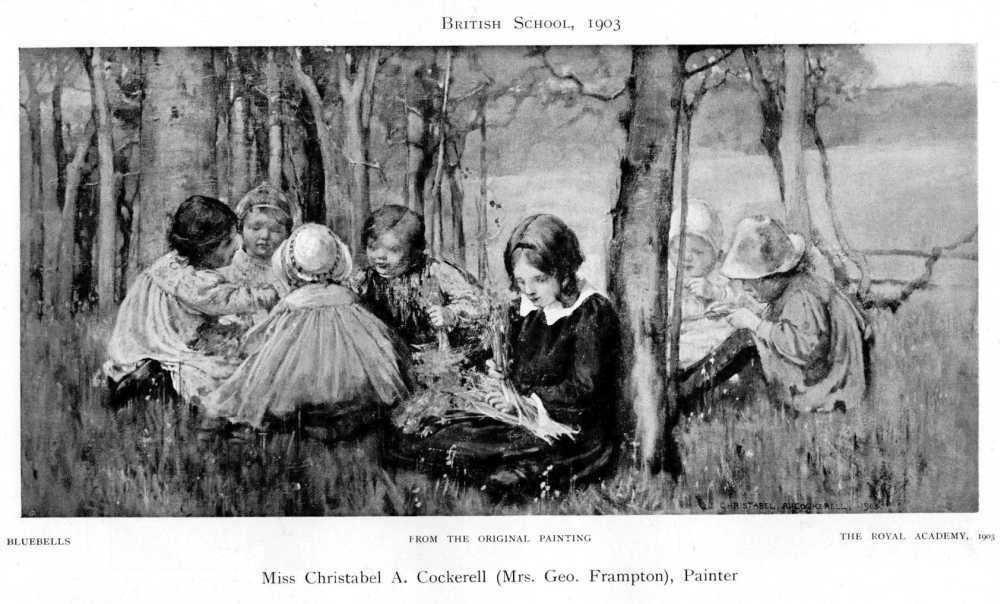
Bluebells (1903) from Women painters of the world by Walter Shaw Sparrow

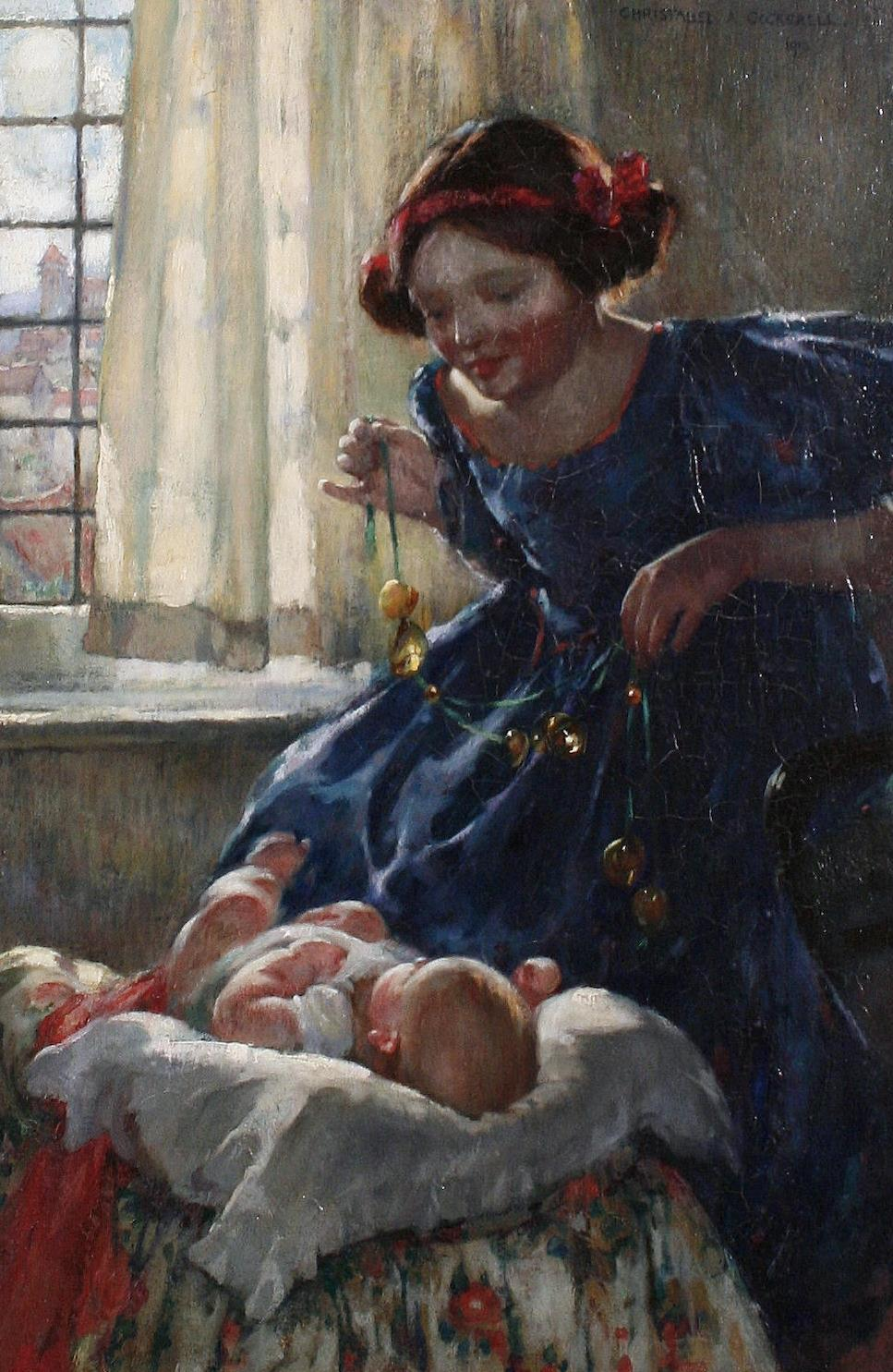
Entertaining the Baby (1910)

Paintings by Cockerell include:

- The day's work done (c. 1890), a study of an old woman, submitted to the Grosvenor Gallery in 1890
- In the Hayfield (c. 1890), oil on panel (36.8 × 45.7 cm), Berkshire Associates, London
- And The Angels Were Her Playmates – from the childhood of St. Elizabeth of Hungary (1896), oil on canvas (82.5 × 76 cm), sold 12 November 1992 at Sotheby's, London
- John Passmore Edwards (1823–1911) (1899), oil on canvas (100 × 52.5 cm), a portrait of the elderly newspaper owner and philanthropist, held in the Hackney Museum (Chalmers Bequest)
- Portrait Of Meredith Frampton (date unknown), oil on canvas (37.5 × 102 cm), sold 4 November 1999 at Christie's, London
- Bluebells (1903), shown at the Royal Academy, of which a copy was included in Walter Shaw Sparrow’s 1905 Women Painters of the World
- A Momentous Question (1903), oil on panel (22.8 × 30.5 cm), exhibited in London, The New Gallery, Summer Exhibition, 1903 and at the Corporation of Manchester Art Gallery; sold 13 November 2003 at Christie's, London for £1880
- Morning Play (1910), oil on canvas (54 × 36 cm), woman and baby
