= Quintin and Alice Hogg Memorial =

Memorial statue in London by George Frampton

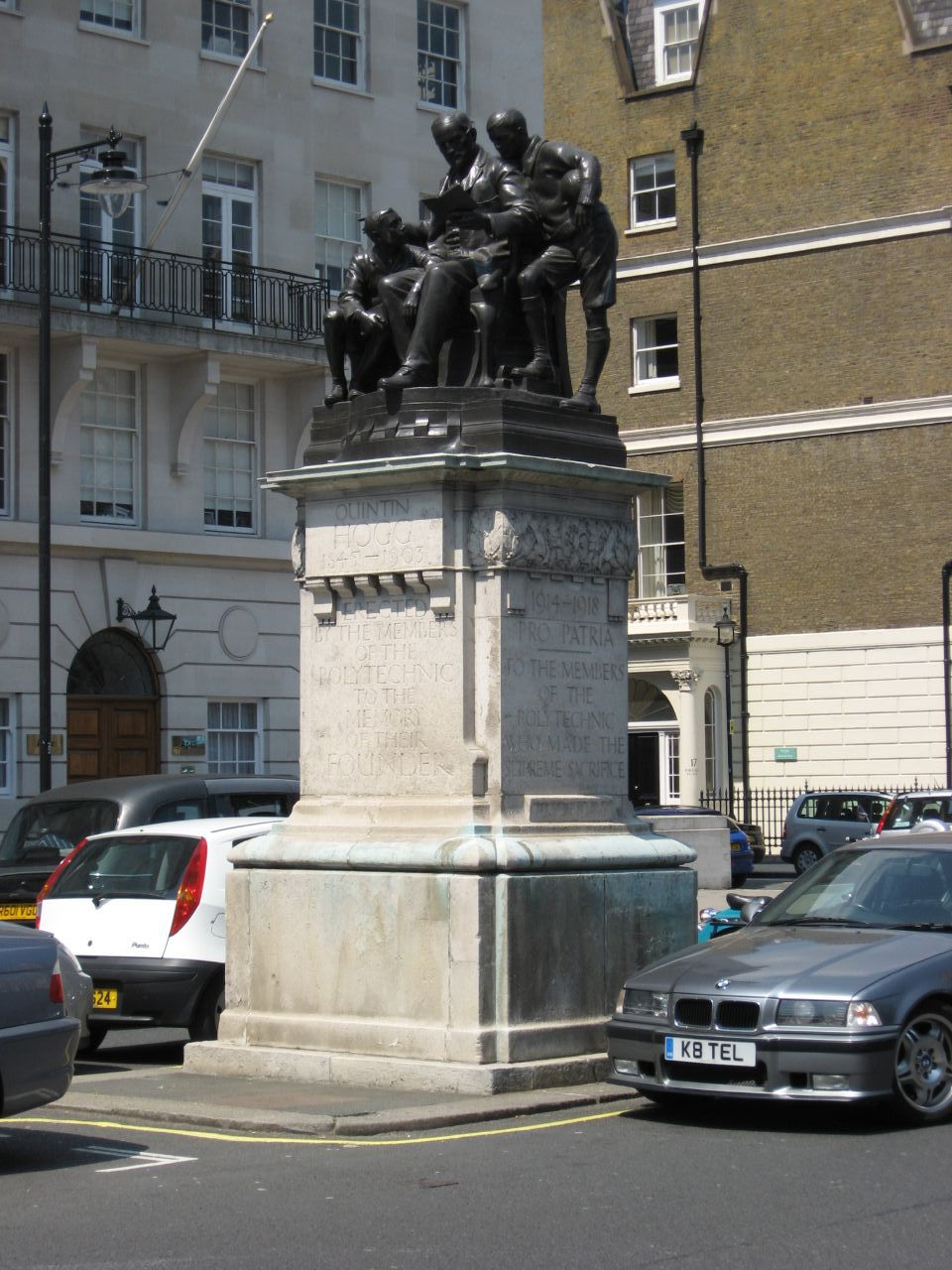
- Year: 1906
- Location: United Kingdom; 51°31′08″N 0°08′40″W

The Quintin and Alice Hogg Memorial is a memorial for English philanthropist Quintin Hogg and his wife Alice stands on Portland Place in central London, opposite BBC Broadcasting House. The bronze memorial depicts Quintin Hogg with two boys, and stands on a plinth of Portland stone. It was designed by George Frampton and erected in 1906. The memorial also honours Hogg's wife, Alice, and those members of the Regent Street Polytechnic (now the University of Westminster) killed in World War I and World War II.

The memorial has been Grade II listed since February 1970.

== Inscriptions ==
There are three inscriptions on the memorial, to honour the Hoggs, and those members of the polytechnic killed in the World Wars.

On the front face of the plinth:

Quintin Hogg, 1845–1903. Erected by the members of the polytechnic to the memory of their founder

On the left face of the plinth:

1845–1918, Alice A Hogg, whose unfailing love & devotion contributed so greatly to the success of the polytechnic.

On the right face of the plinth:

1914–1918, pro patria

To the members of the polytechnic who made the supreme sacrifice.

1939–1945

== Sports ground ==
The University's Quintin Hogg Memorial Sports Ground (51.4773472°N 0.266462°W) is also in London, on Hartington Road, Chiswick.
