= Statue of the Marquess of Salisbury =

Statue in Hatfield, Hertfordshire, England

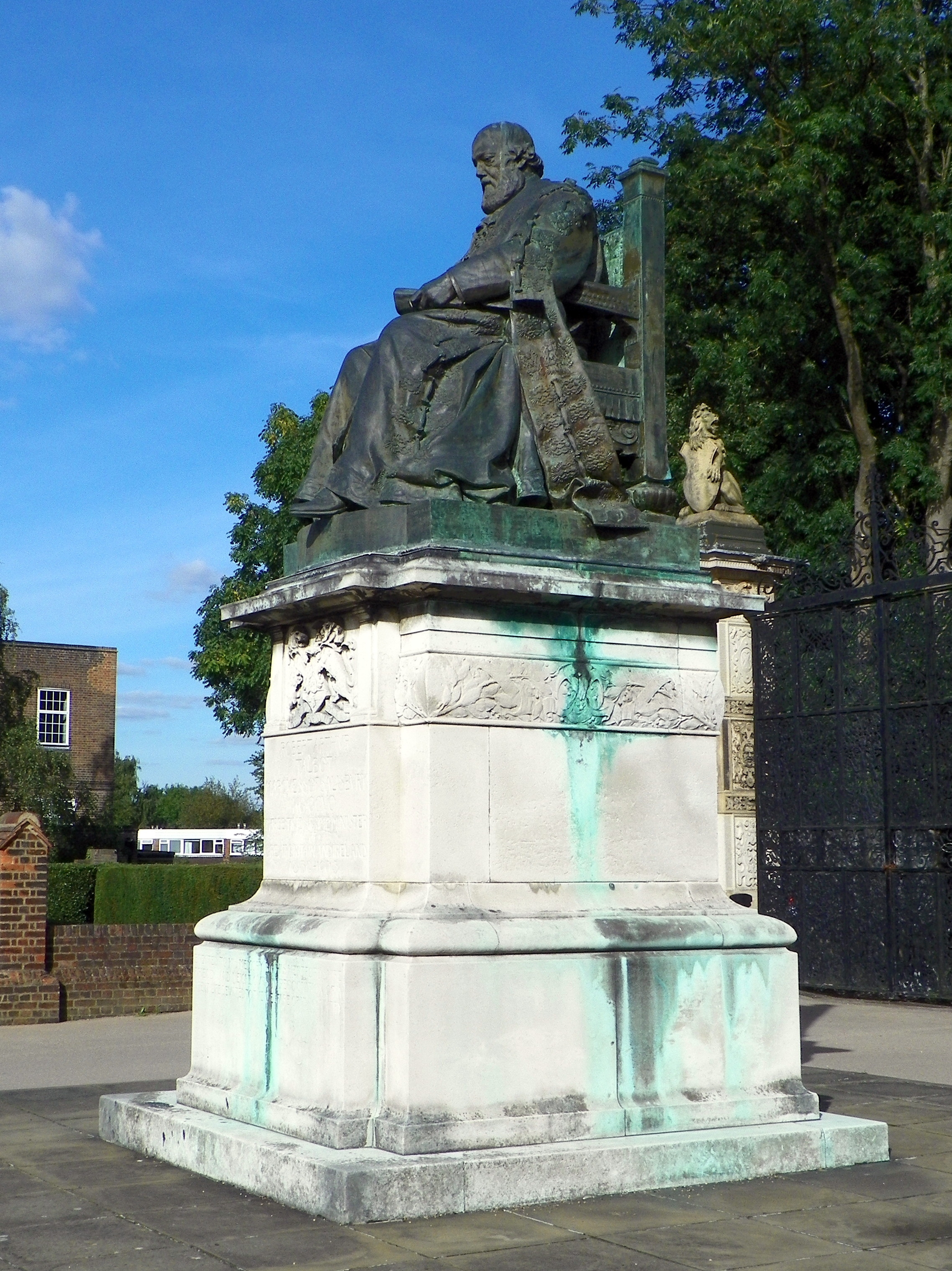
- Artist: George Frampton
- Year: 1906
- Medium: Bronze
- Location: Great North Road, Hatfield

Listed Building – Grade II
- Official name: Statue of Third Marquess of Salisbury
- Designated: 9 December 1983
- Reference no.: 1348149

A statue of Robert Gascoyne-Cecil, 3rd Marquess of Salisbury, stands outside the gates leading to the north side of Hatfield House, Hertfordshire.

The bronze statue by George Frampton was erected in 1906 and portrays The 3rd Marquess of Salisbury in a seated position, raised on a large rectangular stone plinth approximately 2.5 m (8.2 ft) high. The front (west) side of the plinth bears a relief carving of the Salisbury coat of arms, and the inscription robert arthur / talbot / marquess of salisbury / kg kcvo / three times prime minister / of / great britain and ireland / 1830–1903 // erected to his memory by his hertfordshire friends / and neighbours in recognition of a / great life devoted to the welfare of his country.

The statue became a Grade II listed building in 1983. It stands to the west of the gates and screen (separately listed at Grade II) erected by The 3rd Marquess of Salisbury on the approach from Hatfield railway station to Hatfield Park and the north side of Hatfield House (itself Grade I listed). To the north of the statue is the Grade II* listed Hatfield War Memorial.
