= W. S. Gilbert Memorial =

Memorial on the Victoria Embankment in London

Coordinates: 51.507240°N 0.121560°W

W. S. Gilbert
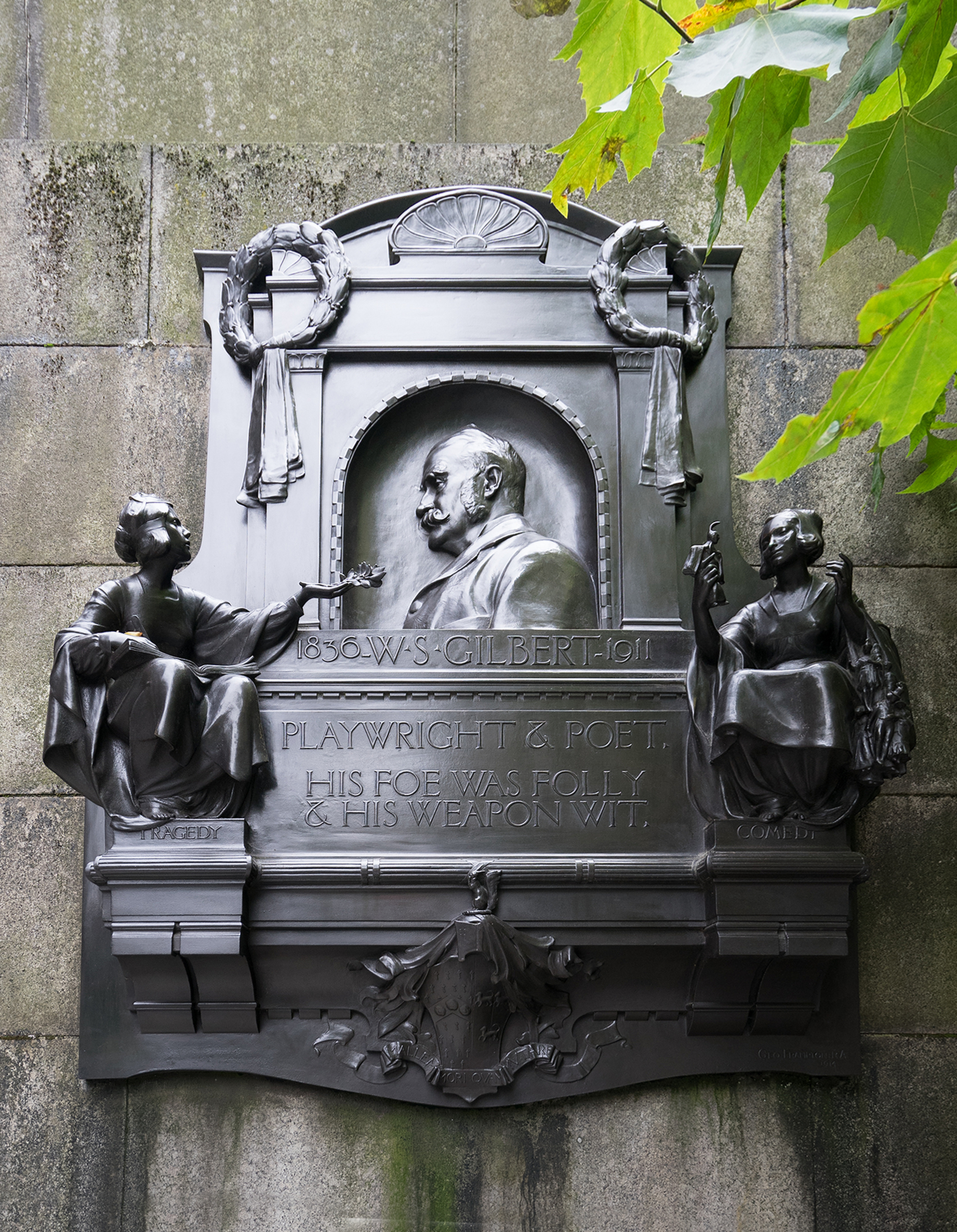
- Artist: George Frampton
- Completion date: 1914
- Subject: W. S. Gilbert
- Location: London

Listed Building – Grade II
- Official name: Memorial to Sir W S Gilbert
- Designated: 5 February 1970
- Reference no.: 1237829

The W. S. Gilbert Memorial is a Grade II listed commemorative bronze plaque on the Victoria Embankment in London. It is mounted on a granite block beside Embankment Pier, on the opposite side of the Hungerford Bridge from the Bazalgette Memorial.

== History and description ==
The memorial was made by George Frampton in 1914 and depicts the dramatist W. S. Gilbert in a bronze portrait relief. The portrait of Gilbert is flanked by two figures representing Comedy and Tragedy. It is near the Arthur Sullivan Memorial in Victoria Embankment Gardens, which commemorates Gilbert's collaborator Arthur Sullivan; together the pair wrote a number of operas for the nearby Savoy Theatre.
