= Hatfield War Memorial =

War memorial in Hertfordshire, England

Coordinates: 51°45′51″N 0°12′53″W

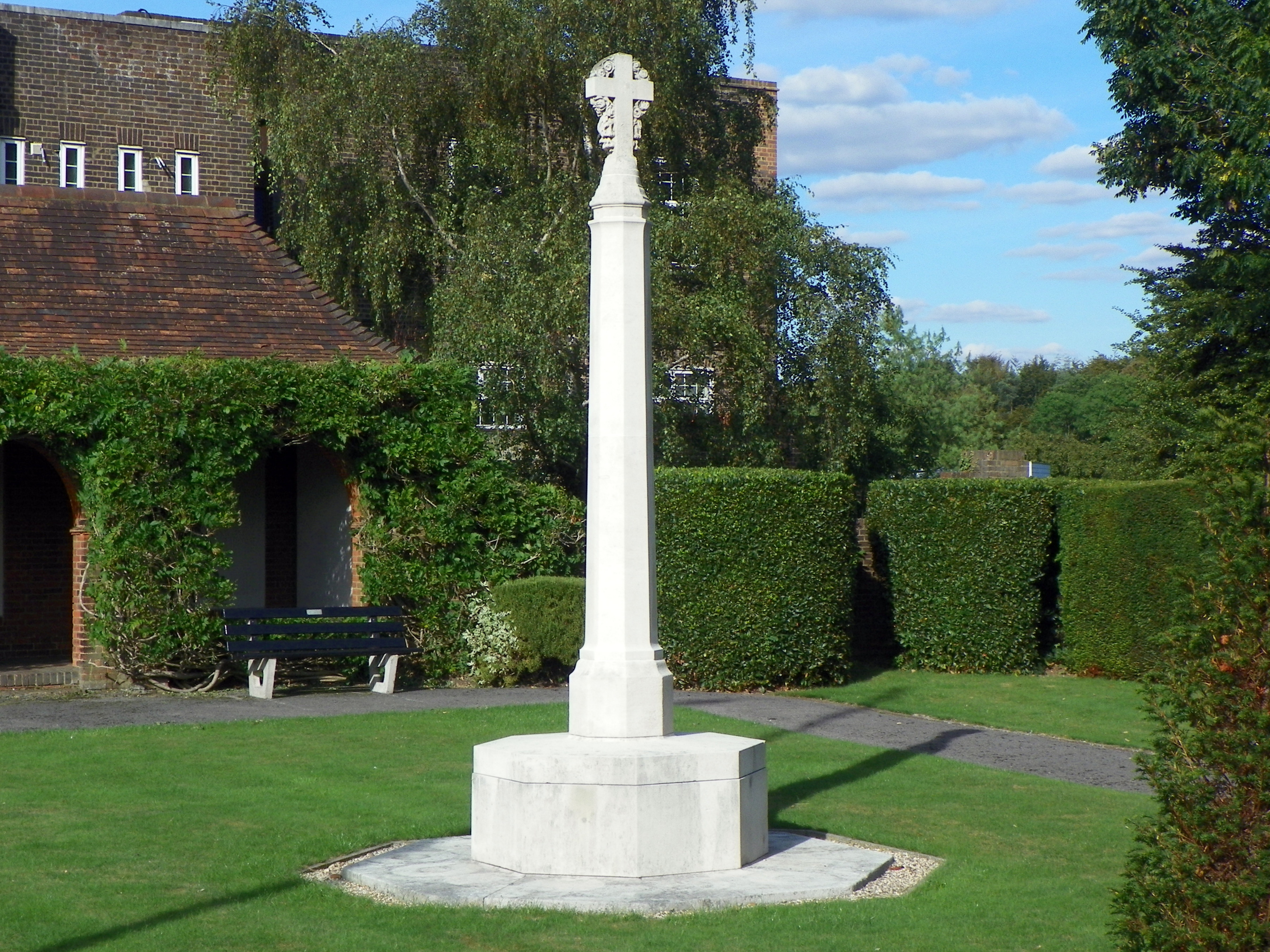
Hatfield War Memorial

The Hatfield War Memorial is a war memorial beside the Great North Road in Hatfield, Hertfordshire. It was one of 24 war memorials in England designed by Sir Herbert Baker, that were designated as a national collection by Historic England in 2017. The memorial is located near the gates of Hatfield House, and close to Hatfield railway station. It was unveiled in 1921, to commemorate 139 men from Hatfield killed on service during the First World War. A brick pavilion records the names of the dead, with further names added after the Second World War.

The memorial comprises a Portland stone memorial cross, standing within a garden surrounded by brick walls to the north, west and south sides, and a yew hedge to the east, with an entrance gate in the wall to the south. Portland stone tablets with dedications listing the names of the dead are located in a brick shelter pavilion to the north side of the garden.

The memorial cross is a typical Baker design, with an octagonal cross section, standing on an octagonal base. Baker had proposed a similar design of memorial cross to the Imperial War Graves Commission (now Commonwealth War Graves Commission), but a different design by Sir Reginald Blomfield was selected instead: the Cross of Sacrifice familiar at many CWGC cemeteries. Baker used versions of his cross in many of the municipal war memorials that he was commissioned to design after the First World War. He was also responsible for the design of 113 cemeteries on the Western Front, including Tyne Cot, Delville Wood South African National Memorial and Neuve-Chapelle Indian Memorial.

The central wheel-headed Latin cross is decorated with roses and lilies representing England and France. It stands on an octagonal shaft and simple octagonal plinth, surrounded by a small octagonal pavement, in the centre of a grass lawn. A rectangular pavilion constructed of red brick stands to the north side of the garden, with three round-headed arches facing towards the cross in the south; the arches were later closed by metal railings. The hipped roof of the pavilion is covered with clay tiles, and the brick floor is laid in a herringbone pattern. The solid side and rear walls bear stone plaques with dedications and lists of names. Baker used similar brick shelters at other memorials, including some for the CWGC on the Western Front.

The Portland stone plaques commemorate the 139 servicemen from Hatfield killed during the First World War. The names of a further 58 men and women were added after the Second World War, along with 34 civilians killed in the 503 bombing raids that affected the area, many targeting the de Havilland aircraft factory nearby.

The memorial was built on land to the east of the Great North Road, near the gates leading to Hatfield House. The site was donated by James Gascoyne-Cecil, 4th Marquess of Salisbury. Construction cost £1,500. The memorial was unveiled on 12 June 1921 by Thomas Brand, 3rd Viscount Hampden (the Lord Lieutenant of Hertfordshire, who had commanded a battalion of the Hertfordshire Regiment) and dedicated by the Bishop of Exeter Lord William Cecil (the younger brother of the 4th Marquess). The names of the dead were read out at the ceremony by Lord Salisbury.

The names of a further 58 men and women were added after the Second World War, along with the names of 34 civilians killed in the 503 bombing raids in the district. Two further names were added in 2014. The memorial was repaired in 1998. The main column was heavily weathered by 2013, and it was replaced in 2015.

The memorial became a Grade II* listed building in May 2017. Nearby are the Grade II listed gates leading to the Grade I listed Hatfield House and its Grade I listed park, and a Grade II listed statue of Robert Gascoyne-Cecil, 3rd Marquess of Salisbury, who served as Prime Minister of the United Kingdom three times.

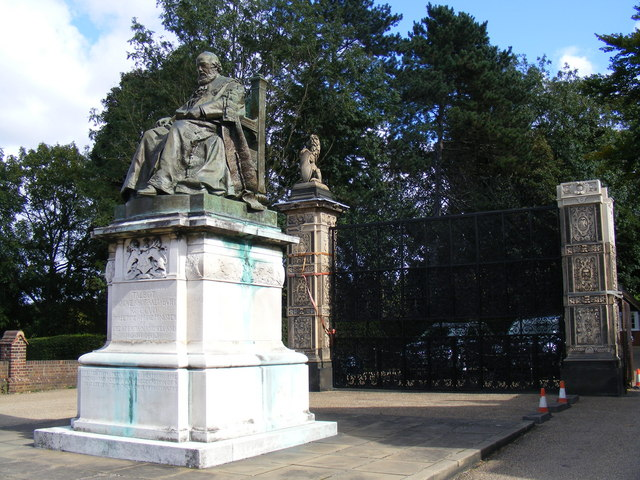
Statue of the 3rd Marquess of Salisbury, before the gates to Hatfield House: the southern wall of the memorial garden is visible to the far left

== See also ==
- Grade II* listed war memorials in England
- Grade II* listed buildings in Hertfordshire
