= George Frampton =

British sculptor (1860-1928)

Sir George James Frampton RA
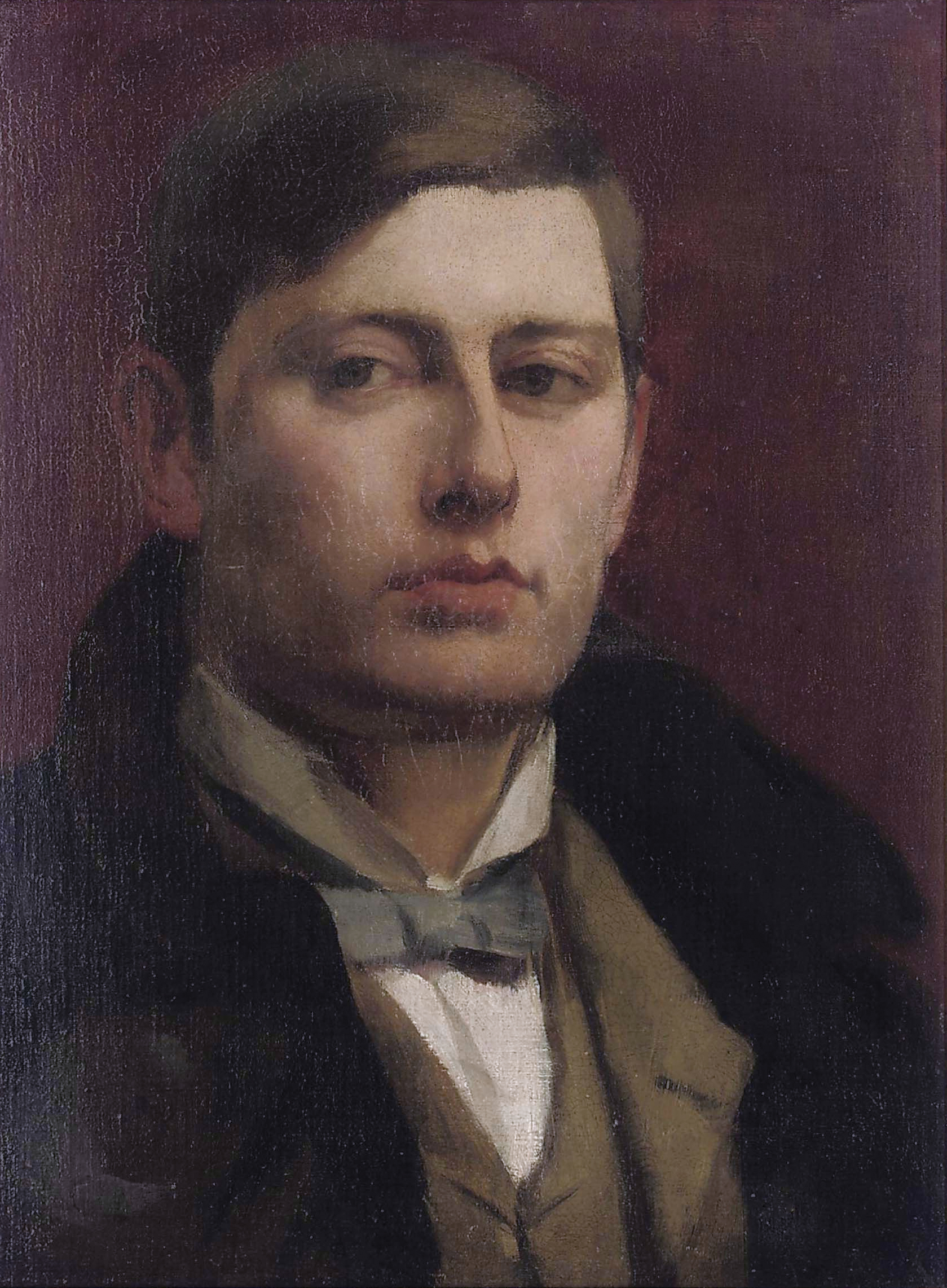
- Portrait of Frampton by W. H. Latham
- Born: 18 June 1860; London, England
- Died: 21 May 1928 (aged 67)
- Education: South London Technical School of Art; Royal Academy Schools
- Known for: Sculpture
- Movement: New Sculpture
- Spouse: Christabel Cockerell (m. 1893)

Sir George James Frampton, RA (18 June 1860 – 21 May 1928) was a British sculptor. He was a leading member of the New Sculpture movement in his early career when he created sculptures with elements of Art Nouveau and Symbolism, often combining various materials such as marble and bronze in a single piece. While his later works were more traditional in style, Frampton had a prolific career in which he created many notable public monuments, including several statues of Queen Victoria and later, after World War I, a number of war memorials. These included the Edith Cavell Memorial in London, which, along with the Peter Pan statue in Kensington Gardens are possibly Frampton's best known works.

== Biography ==
=== Early life ===
Frampton was born on 18 June 1860 in London, where his father was a woodcarver and stonemason. George Frampton began his own working life as a stone carver in 1878, working on the Hôtel de Ville in Paris. Frampton returned to London to study under William Silver Frith at the South London Technical School of Art during 1880 and 1881. He went on to the Royal Academy Schools where, between 1881 and 1887, he won a gold medal and travelling scholarship. While still studying at the Royal Academy, Frampton undertook a number of sculpture commissions including, in 1885, pieces for the facade of both the Constitutional Club in Northumberland Avenue and for the Chelsea Conservative Club. He also created an altarpiece for Manchester Cathedral, some decorative pieces for the Henry Fawcett Memorial in London and a pair of terracotta figures representing Concord and Industry which were exhibited in Paris and purchased for the Municipal Building in Christchurch, New Zealand. From 1887 to 1890, he studied and worked at the studio of Antonin Mercie in Paris, where he also studied painting under Pascal Dagnan-Bouveret and Gustave Courtois.

=== Early works ===
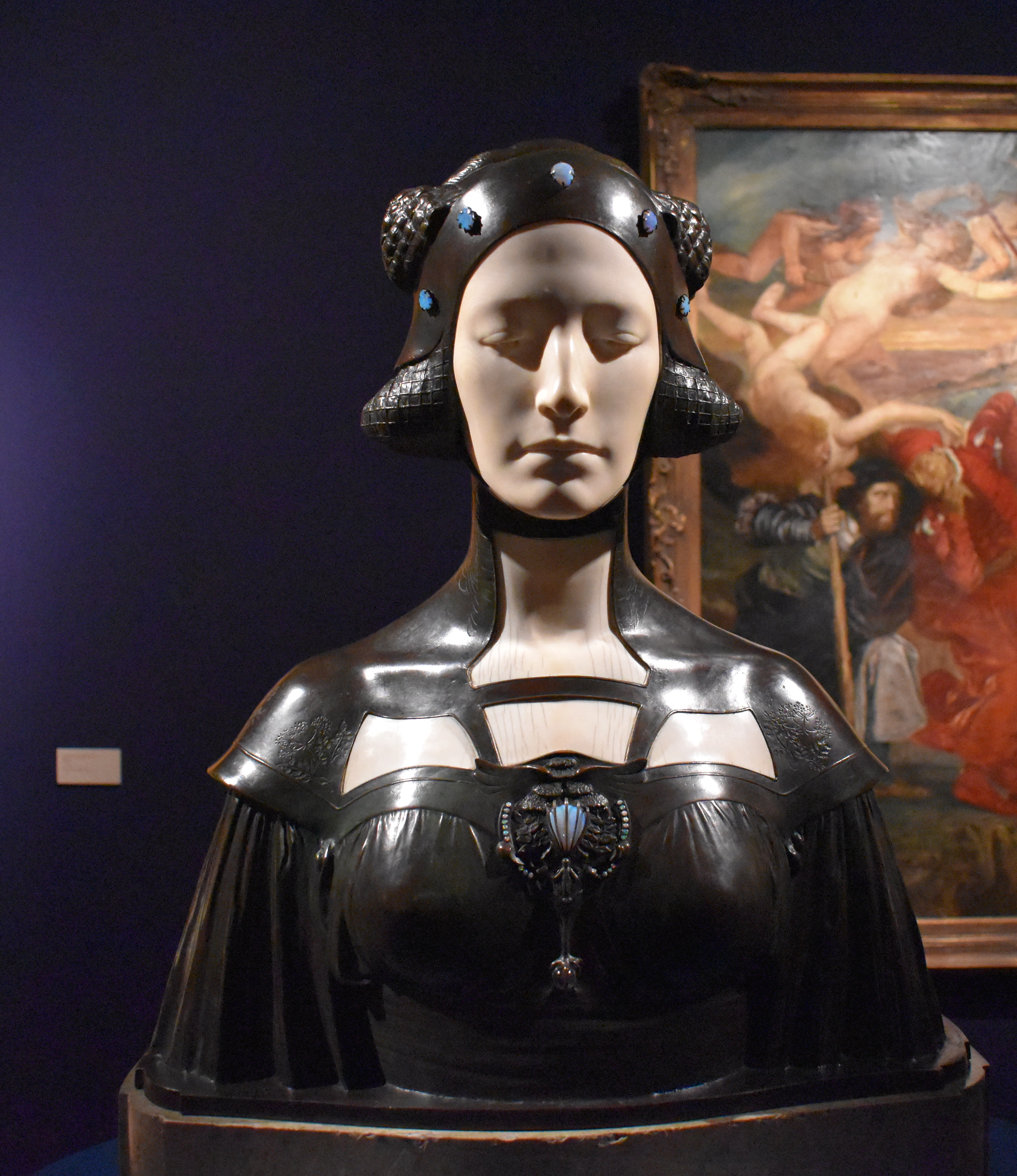
Lamia (1899–1900)

Frampton returned to England and, briefly, worked in the studio of Sir Joseph Edgar Boehm. He then took up a teaching post at the Slade School of Art in 1893 and was also, for a year, the joint head of the Central School of Arts and Crafts.

In 1893, Frampton married the artist Christabel Cockerell and the couple set up home together at St John's Wood in London. Together they designed a decorative frieze for the interior of the house and Frampton began to design household fittings, jewellery in enamel and precious metals and also medals, most notably for Glasgow University and Winchester College. By this time, Frampton was, according to the critic M.H. Spielmann "in open rebellion against white sculpture". In 1893, he showed Mysteriarch, a polychromatic plaster bust with Symbolism motifs at the Royal Academy and, two years later he showed another polychromatic work, Mother and Child at the same venue. Mother and Child has bronze figures, of Frampton's wife and son, set against a copper plaque, and a white enamel disc behind the mother's head.

In his statue of Dame Alice Owen (1897) Frampton combined bronze, alabaster, gilding and marble, and, later, with the bust Lamia (1899-1900) he contrasted an ivory head and neck with bronze clothing inlaid with opals. The statue of Dame Alice Owen was originally shown at the Royal Academy as a free-standing statue but when it was installed in the entry hall of Owen's School Frampton made it the centre of a larger installation that he designed. In panels and niches around the statue, which he placed on a pink marble pedestal, Frampton included 16th-century carvings of Owen's ancestors and fragments of her 17th-century tomb.

In 1896, Frampton exhibited, with the architect Charles Harrison Townsend, a large fireplace in American walnut at the Arts and Crafts Exhibition Society. The fireplace was decorated with an innovative tree and foliage design by Frampton that was subsequently much imitated by Art Nouveau and Arts and Crafts designers and became known as the "Frampton tree". Frampton used a similar design in his 1897 memorial to Charles Mitchell for St George's Church in Jesmond in Newcastle upon Tyne.

=== Recognition ===
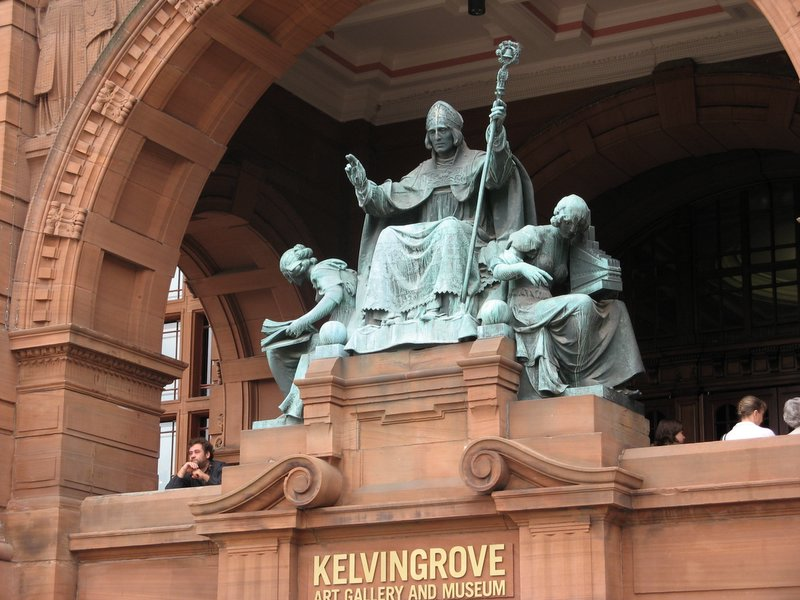
St Mungo as the Patron of Art and Music, Kelvingrove Art Gallery and Museum

Frampton's body of work in the 1880s brought him considerable recognition. The University of St Andrews awarded him an honorary doctorate in 1894. In 1897, examples of Frampton's work featured at the Venice Biennale and at the Vienna Secession the following year. He regularly exhibited at the La Libre Esthétique in Brussels, a city he considered an important market for his work. For the four pieces he showed at the Paris International Exhibition in 1900, Frampton was awarded the Grand Prix. Those works included My Thoughts Are My Children, 1894, a large polychromic relief in bronze in a wooden frame depicting a woman holding a lily surrounded by drapery under a second female figure holding an infant and two children in front of a symbol of a rising sun. The work appears to have had a special significance to Frampton as he frequently chose it to represent his work at other major international exhibitions and kept the piece in his possession throughout his life. The work passed to his son, Meredith Frampton, who eventually donated it to the Walker Art Gallery in Liverpool.

Recognition also brought Frampton two significant public commissions at this time. The architect John William Simpson appointed Frampton as master sculptor for the decoration of the facade of the Kelvingrove Art Gallery and Museum in Glasgow. As well as overseeing the work of several other sculptors, Frampton created a bronze sculpture group and three sets of stone spandrels for the north porch of the new building. The sculpture group, of St Mungo attended by the muses of Art and Music, in the central arch of the porch contains Symbolism style motifs featuring trees, bells and fishes similar to those Frampron had used in some of his earlier smaller pieces. Frampton's other commission was for a frieze on the facade of the Lloyd's Register building in Fenchurch Street in London. There, Frampton created, at first floor level, a frieze in Portland stone of female figures representing Trade, Commerce and Shipping with four bronze statuettes at key points. Both commissions, but especially the Fenchurch Street frieze, were widely praised at the time.

=== Later career ===
In April 1897, a public meeting in Calcutta (now Kolkata) agreed to raise funds to mark the Diamond Jubilee of Queen Victoria and, eventually, commissioned Frampton to create a statue of the monarch. Photographs of Frampton's model for the statue were published in the July 1898 edition of The Studio. The accompanying text described a figure over twice life-size, seated under a canopy, wearing the robe of the Order of the Star of India, decorated in gold, ivory and lapis lazuli. A polychrome plaster version was displayed at the Glasgow Exhibition of 1901 and was greatly praised for its depiction of the elderly queen. The completed statue was shipped to India early in 1901 and erected on a temporary site in March 1902. Although the statue sent to India was considerably less ornate and lacked the canopy of the original proposal, Frampton's completed work included two putti in a New Sculpture style above the back of the throne plus two miniature infantrymen on the pedestal and a small figure of St George held by the Queen. The statue was subsequently moved to a location in front of the Victoria Memorial, where it was sited on a large architectural podium. Lord Curzon, the driving force behind the Memorial project, came to dislike Frampton's depiction of an elderly and vulnerable Victoria and commissioned Thomas Brock to create a second statue, in marble, of a younger Queen to be placed in the central hall of the completed building.

The death of Queen Victoria in January 1901 led to Frampton receiving several commissions for memorials to the Queen. Frampton based several of these on his design of a seated figure he used for the Kolkata statue but with some variations. He used the same cast for the statues in Leeds and St Helens but changed the style of the decorative details and pedestals between them. A further version was created for the grounds of the Manitoba Legislative Building in Winnipeg in 1904. A different design of a much younger, standing Victoria was created for the Royal Victoria Infirmary in Newcastle upon Tyne in 1906 and was unveiled by her son King Edward VII in the same year.

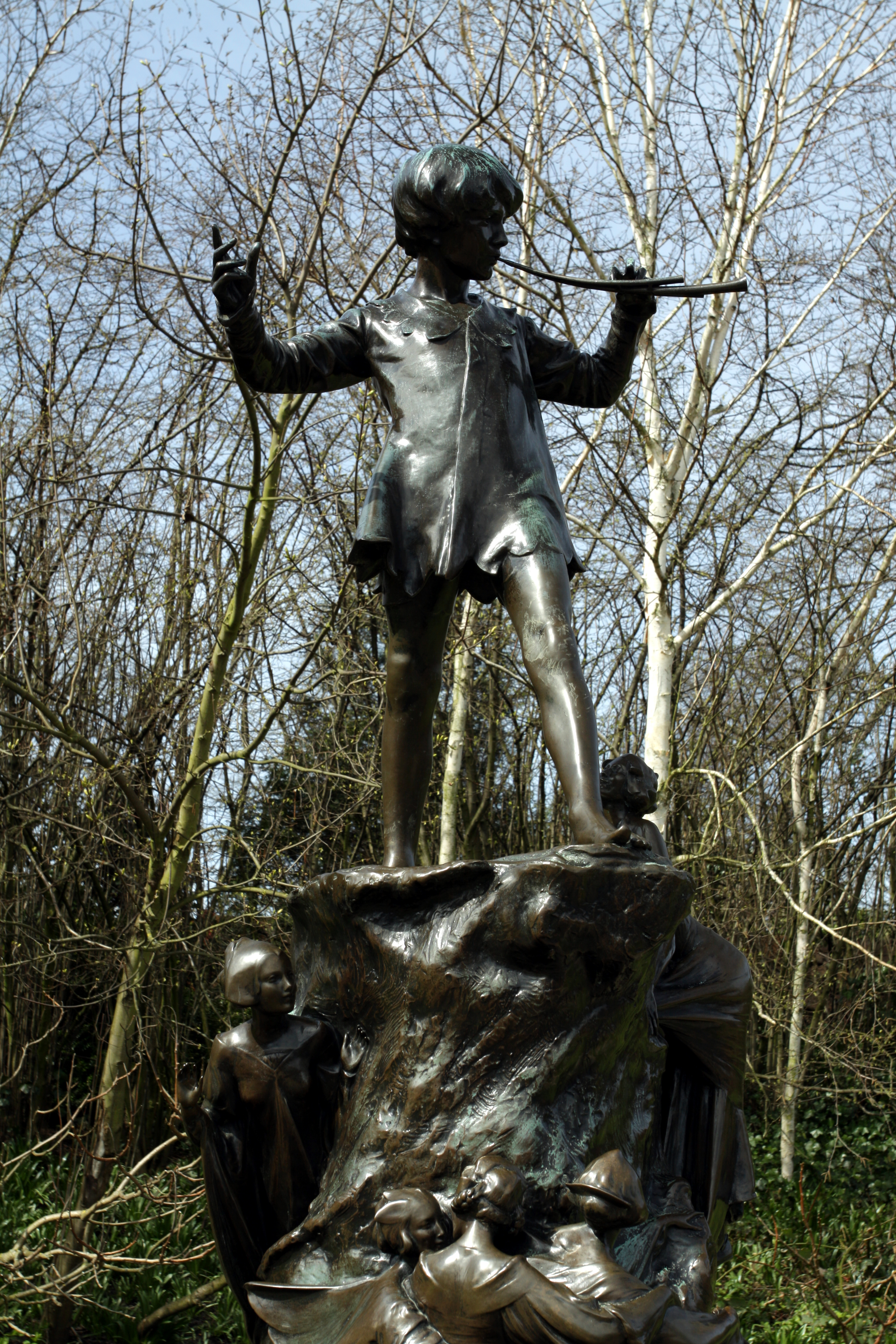
Peter Pan statue in Kensington Gardens, London

Among Frampton's other notable public sculptures are the figures of Peter Pan playing a set of pipes, the lions at the British Museum and the Edith Cavell Memorial that stands outside the National Portrait Gallery, London.

Frampton's original statue of Peter Pan in Kensington Gardens, London, was commissioned by J.M. Barrie in 1912. Barrie was said to be disappointed at Frampton's depiction of Peter Pan, in particular at his choice of model for the figure of the boy. However such was the popularity of the statue, six more casts were made which are now situated in:

- Perth, Western Australia, Australia
- Parc d'Egmont, Brussels, Belgium
- Bowring Park, St. John's, Newfoundland, Canada
- Toronto, Canada
- Sefton Park, Liverpool, England
- Camden, New Jersey, United States.

By March 1905, Aston Webb, the architect of the Cromwell Road extension to the Victoria and Albert Museum had commissioned over twenty sculptors to provide statues, carvings and decorations for the facade of the building. Webb allocated what he considered the two most important areas to Frampton and Alfred Drury. The area over the main entrance arch was allocated to Frampton who created spandrel figures of Truth and Beauty for the space while the remainder of the main entrance was assigned to Drury.

A number of Frampton's works can be seen at the restored St James' Church, Warter in East Yorkshire. Frampton created Dr Barnardo's Memorial, in Barkingside, London, in 1908, a work he undertook without claiming a fee.

During World War I Frampton used his position in various art societies and institutions to expel any German members he considered potential "enemy aliens". When the Art Workers Guild refused to expel Karl Krall, a British citizen born in Germany, Frampton resigned from the Guild. In 1915, Frampton was commissioned to create a public memorial to Edith Cavell. Having waived his fee for the work, Frampton's modernist style monument in marble and granite was unveiled to huge crowds near Trafalgar Square in central London during 1920. The severe, modern appearance of the memorial is distinct from Frampton's earlier, more heroic style of Boer War memorials and was criticised as such. Several contemporary sculptors also criticised the design and the engineering of the monument.

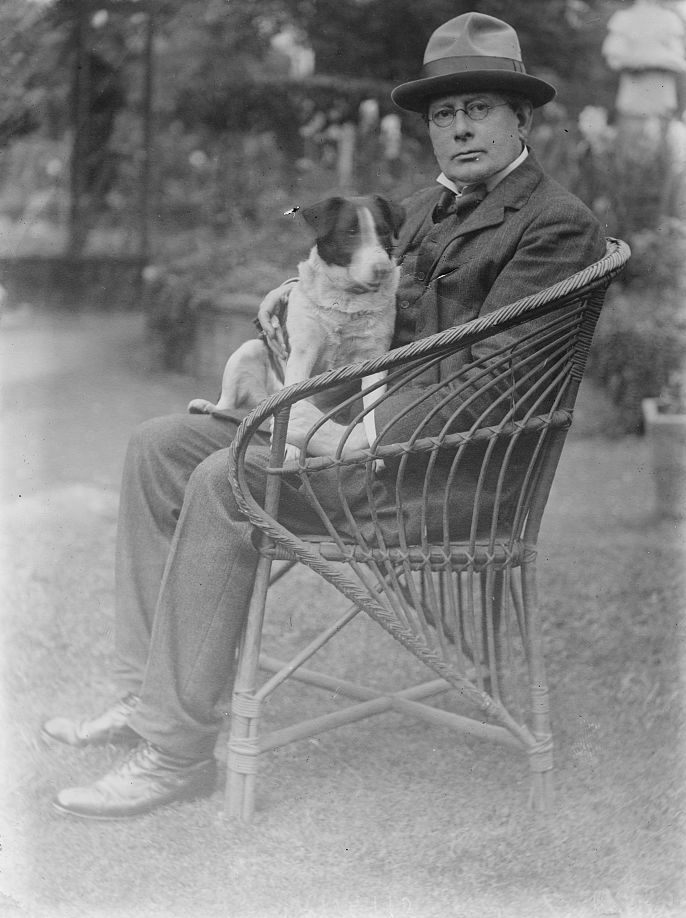
Sir George James Frampton in 1915

Frampton subsequently worked with Sir Edwin Lutyens on two of the architect's war memorials in the aftermath of the First World War, the Hove War Memorial in East Sussex and the Fordham War Memorial in Cambridgeshire, unveiled in February and August 1921 respectively. Both feature a bronze statue of Saint George, sculpted by Frampton atop a column designed by Lutyens.

== Personal life ==
Frampton's first house and studio was at 32 Queen's Grove (where a blue plaque to his name has been erected), but he later built a larger house nearby in Carlton Hill, both in St John's Wood, London. He was married to the artist Christabel Cockerell and had one son, the painter and etcher Meredith Frampton.

Frampton, like several of his contemporaries, referred to himself as an "art worker" rather than an artist or sculptor and championed the equality of artistic work with craft or decorative practices. He was an active member of The Art Workers' Guild and became Master in 1902. He sculpted the Art Workers' Guild's Master's Jewel in silver representing 'Art is Unity'. Frampton became a royal academician in 1902 and was knighted in 1908.

== Death ==
Frampton died on 21 May 1928 aged 67 and was cremated at Golders Green Crematorium on 25 May. His ashes lie in a niche on the ground floor of the east wing of the Ernest George Columbarium. A memorial sculpted by Ernest Gillick in 1930 depicting a bronze child holding a miniature copy of Frampton's statue of Peter Pan is located in the Crypt of St. Paul's Cathedral.

== Public monuments ==
=== 1887–1899 ===
Image	Title / subject	Location and coordinates	Date	Type	Material	Dimensions	Designation	Wikidata	Notes
More images	Industry & Concord	Our City, Christchurch, New Zealand	1887	Two statues	Terracotta				Both statues were damaged in the 2011 Christchurch earthquake
	Altarpiece	Church of St Clare, Liverpool	1890	Triptych with paintings & reliefs			Grade I		With Robert Anning Bell
	James Russell Lowell	Westminster Abbey, London	1893	Wall plaque	Marble				
More images	Mother and Child	Victoria and Albert Museum, London	1895	Sculpture group	Silvered bronze	102cm high			The work was originally exhibited in front of a copper plaque containing a white disc.
More images	Arthurian door	Two Temple Place, London	1896	Nine low-relief door panels	Silver-gilt				
	Cigarette box	Victoria and Albert Museum	1897	Bowl on stem with circular foot	Silver and enamel	23cm x 15.5cm			Made by Alexander Fisher
More images	William Rathbone VI	St John's Gardens, Liverpool	1899	Statue on pedestal	Bronze and stone		Grade II	Q26333151	

=== 1900–1904 ===
Image	Title / subject	Location and coordinates	Date	Type	Material	Dimensions	Designation	Wikidata	Notes
More images	St. Mungo as the Patron of Art and Music	Kelvingrove Art Gallery and Museum, Glasgow	1901	Sculpture group	Bronze				
	William Howitt & Mary Howitt	Nottingham Castle	1901	Bas relief on plinth	Bronze and granite				
	Presentation casket	Victoria and Albert Museum	1901	Casket	Silver and ivory				Presentation piece to Field Marshall Earl Roberts from the Merchant Taylors Company
	Saint Elizabeth	Victoria and Albert Museum	1902	Bust	Wax	47cm high			
More images	Queen Victoria	Grounds of the Victoria Memorial, Kolkata	1902	Seated statue on pedestal and steps	Bronze and stone			Q92360272	
More images	Statue of Queen Victoria	Victoria Square, St Helens, Merseyside	1902	Seated statue on pedestal	Bronze on sandstone and granite	6.4m	Grade II*	Q15979535	
More images	Memorial to Walter Besant	Savoy Place, Victoria Embankment, London	1902, erected 1904	Plaque	Bronze			Q27096149	A cast of an identical monument in the crypt of St Paul's Cathedral, unveiled in 1901.
More images	Memorial to Queen Victoria	Woodhouse Moor, Leeds	1903, unveiled 1905	Seated statue, frieze and figures on column	Bronze and Portland stone		Grade II*	Q15979175	
More images	Arthur Forwood	St John's Gardens, Liverpool	1903	Statue on pedestal	Bronze and stone		Grade II	Q26643650	
More images	Queen Victoria	Southport, Merseyside	1903	Statue on pedestal	Bronze and stone		Grade II	Q26659949	
More images	Statue of Queen Victoria	Manitoba Legislative Building, Canada	1904	Seated statue on pedestal	Bronze and granite			Q16903553	
	Boer War memorial	The Chapel, Radley College, Oxfordshire	1904	Statue, St George & the Dragon, on sarcophagus	Bronze and alabaster				Architect: Sir Thomas Graham Jackson

=== 1905–1909 ===
Image	Title / subject	Location and coordinates	Date	Type	Material	Dimensions	Designation	Wikidata	Notes
More images	Lancashire Fusiliers Boer War memorial	Oldfield Road, Salford	1905	Statue on pedestal	Bronze and stone	6m high	Grade II	Q26665909	
More images	Lancashire Fusiliers Boer War memorial	Whitehead Gardens, Bury, Greater Manchester	1905	Statue on pedestal	Bronze and stone	6m high	Grade II	Q66478197	
	Truth	Main entrance, Victoria & Albert Museum, London	1905–1907	Sculpture group in spandrel	Stone				
	Beauty	Main entrance, Victoria & Albert Museum, London	1905–1907	Sculpture group in spandrel	Stone				
	Statue of Robert Gascoyne-Cecil, 3rd Marquess of Salisbury	Old Hatfield, Hertfordshire	1906	Statue on pedestal	Bronze and stone		Grade II	Q26631553	
More images	Quintin and Alice Hogg Memorial	Portland Place, London	1906	Statue group on pedestal	Bronze and limestone		Grade II	Q18595368	
More images	Queen Victoria	Royal Victoria Infirmary, Newcastle upon Tyne	1906	Statue on pedestal	Marble		Grade II*	Q17552314	
More images	Sir Edward James Reed	City Hall, Cardiff	After 1906	Plaque	Bronze				
More images	Canon Thomas Major Lester	St John's Gardens, Liverpool	1907	Statue on pedestal	Bronze and stone		Grade II	Q26504975	
	Memorial to William McLaren	St. Cuthbert's, Edinburgh	1907	Relief sculpture	Stone				
More images	Memorial to Dr Barnardo	Barkingside, London	1908	Statue on pedestal with plaque	Bronze and stone	4.8m high	Grade II*	Q17553256	
More images	Pair of Lions	Exterior of King Edward VII Galleries, British Museum, London	1909	Two sculptures	Stone		Grade I		
	General Sir William Lockhart	St Giles' Cathedral, Edinburgh	1909	Relief tablet in frame	Marble and bronze				

=== 1910–1919 ===
Image	Title / subject	Location and coordinates	Date	Type	Material	Dimensions	Designation	Wikidata	Notes
More images	Statue of Peter Pan	Kensington Gardens, London	1912	Sculpture group	Bronze	4.3m high	Grade II*	Q17549621	
More images	Memorial to William Thomas Stead	Temple Pier, Victoria Embankment, London	1913, unveiled 1920	Plaque	Bronze		Grade II	Q26319157	A replica was unveiled in Central Park, New York, in 1921.
More images	Alfred Lewis Jones	Pier Head, Liverpool	1913	Statue on pedestal with figures	Bronze and stone		Grade II	Q26320985	
	William Whiteley	Whiteley Village, Surrey	1914	Statue on pedestal with plaques	Copper and stone	6m high	Grade II	Q26281430	
More images	Memorial to W. S. Gilbert	Embankment Pier, London	1914, unveiled 1915	Plaque on block	Bronze and granite		Grade II	Q27081628	
	Samuel Barnett & Henrietta Barnett	Westminster Abbey, London	1916	Plaque	Green & white marble				
More images	Edith Cavell	National Portrait Gallery, London	1916	Bust	Plaster	900 x 600mm			
More images	Pearl Assurance War Memorial	Pearl Assurance offices, Peterborough	1919	Statue on pedestal	Bronze and stone		Grade II*	Q62132803	Erected in London in 1921, relocated to Peterborough in 1991
More images	War memorial	Knowlton, Kent	1919	Lantern cross with figures	Stone			Q94131948	

=== 1920 and later ===
Image	Title / subject	Location and coordinates	Date	Type	Material	Dimensions	Designation	Wikidata	Notes
More images	Memorial to Edith Cavell	St Martin's Place, Charing Cross, London	1920	Statue with pillar and cross	Carrara marble and granite	12m high	Grade I	Q18159833	
More images	Phoenix Insurance war memorial	National Memorial Arboretum	c. 1920	Plaque on surround	Bronze and stone			Q116761425	Relocated from Ledsham, Cheshire, rededicated 1999.
More images	War memorial	Wittersham, Kent	1921	Orb on octagonal column	Portland and Wealden stone	5m tall	Grade II	Q26676940	
More images	Statue of Saint George	Hove War Memorial, Hove, East Sussex	1921	Statue on pillar	Stone		Grade II	Q26482745	Memorial designed by Sir Edward Lutyens
More images	Statue of Saint George	Fordham War Memorial, Fordham, Cambridgeshire	1921	Statue on pillar	Stone		Grade II	Q26616619	Memorial designed by Sir Edward Lutyens, statue stolen 1992.
More images	War memorial	Tonbridge Road, Maidstone	1922	Statue on pedestal	Bronze and limestone		Grade II	Q26675478	
More images	War memorial	King Edward VII Memorial Park, Cleckheaton	1922	Sculpture group on pedestal with surround	Portland stone		Grade II	Q26428794	
More images	War memorial	Town Hall Green, Portrush, County Antrim	1922	Statue on pedestal with plaques	Bronze and granite		Grade B1	Q126701392	Sculptor: Frank Ransom
More images	War memorial	Mennock, Dumfries and Galloway	1922	Obelisk with plaque	Granite, bronze and alabaster			Q114168791	
	John Pilkington Norris	Bristol Cathedral		Plaque	Bronze				

=== Other works, United Kingdom ===
- Marble statue of Queen Mary, Guildhall Art Gallery, London
- Sandstone reliefs for 177 Ingram St, Glasgow, 1896–1900

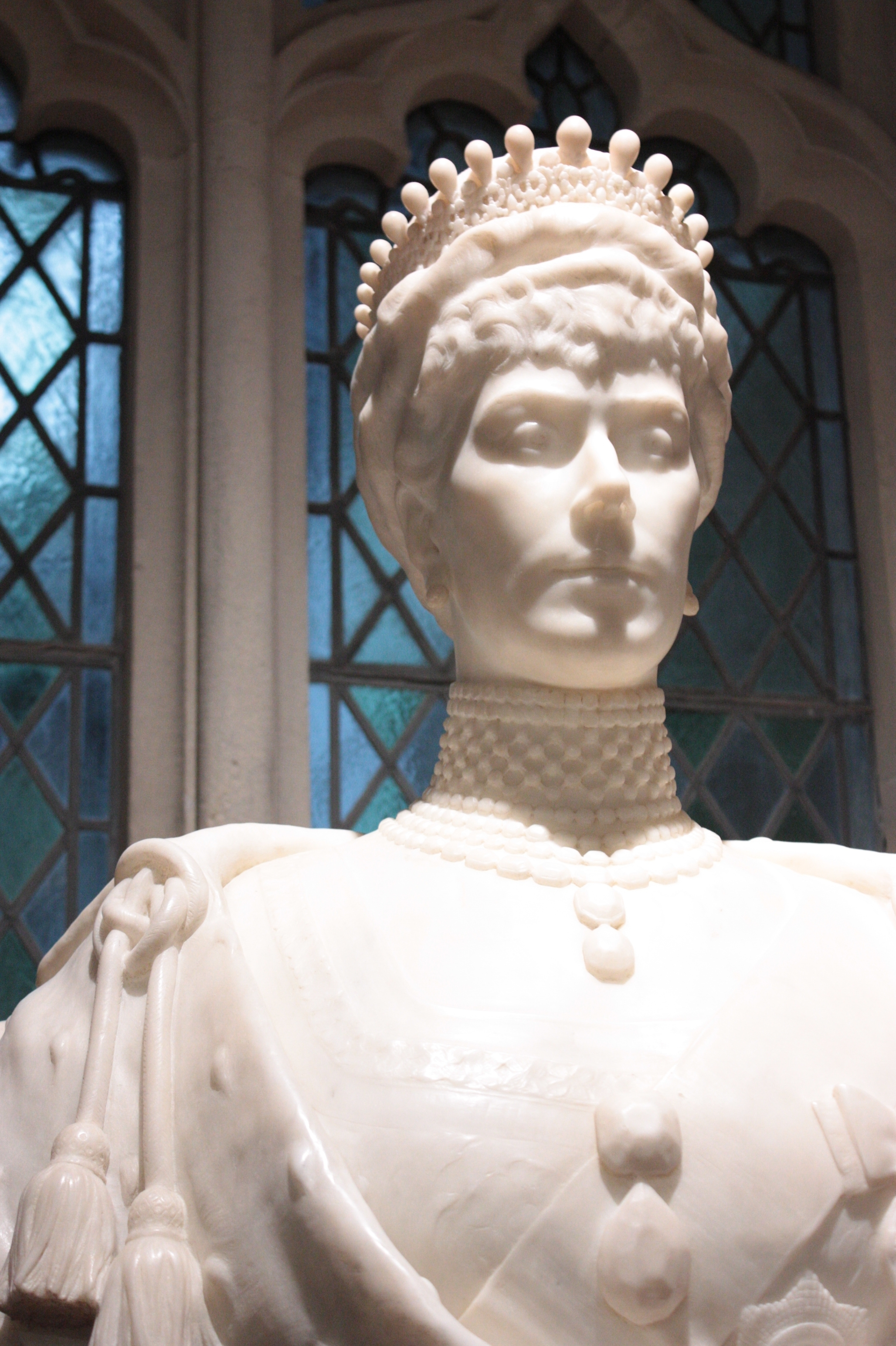
Queen Mary, Guildhall Art Gallery, London

- Stone spandrel reliefs for Electra House, Moorgate c.1902
- Kelvingrove Art Gallery and Museum, stone spandrels on the north porch entrance, main face British Colonies saluting the Arms of Glasgow, side returns Love teaching Harmony to the Arts and The Industries of Glasgow at the Court of Mercury
- Figure of Bishop George Wilkinson in St Ninian's Cathedral, Perth.
- Bronze bust of Francis Galton at University College London
- A bust of Richard Garnett which was shown at the Royal Academy in 1899.
- A 1908 bust of Robert Herbert in the Foreign Office, London.
- Bust of Frederick Inderwick in the Royal Courts of Justice in London.
- Frampton cooperated with Alfred East and Thomas Cooper Gotch to create a memorial tablet to the artist John Trivett Nettleship for a church in Kettering.
- An original bust, and several copies, of John Passmore Edwards.
- Head & shoulders in high relief of Dr Barnardo at Barnardo's Home in Barkingside, 1908.
- Statuette of St George, a memorial to pilot Lieutenant Francis Mond who was killed in action on 15 May 1918.
- Monument to Charles William Mitchell, Church of St George, Jesmond, Newcastle upon Tyne, 1903-1905
- Marble recumbent effigy of Lady Isobel Wilson, died 1905, in St James' Church, Warter, Yorkshire
- Monument, with portrait bust, to Sir George Williams, 1908, the crypt of St Paul's Cathedral, London
- Monument, with portrait medallion and statue of St George, to Edward VII, King Edward's Hospital, Northampton, c. 1910
- Three marble relief plaques depicting Agriculture, Commerce and Literature, Art and Science which were part of a large fireplace for the former Imperial Institute building in London and are now in the collection of the Victoria and Albert Museum.

=== Other works, India ===
- Marble statue of Queen Mary, 1910, interior of the Victoria Memorial, Kolkata
- Marble statue of Queen Mary, c. 1918, installed 1930 in the Marble Hall of Rashtrapati Bhavan, New Delhi;- now the official residence of the President of India
- Marble bust, 1914, of Queen Mary for the entrance for Queen Mary's College for Women, Mylapore, Chennai
- Bronze, equestrian statue of Sir John Woodburn, Lieutenant Governor of Bengal, erected 1907 in Kolkata, later relocated to Barrackpore
- Bronze statue on a pedestal of Andrew Henderson Leith Fraser, 1911, gardens of Victoria Memorial, Kolkata
- Bronze statue of Queen Victoria, c. 1899, now in the Uttar Pradesh State Museum, Lucknow
- Marble statue of Antony MacDonnell, 1st Baron MacDonnell, 1905, erected 1907 at Lucknow, India and now in the Uttar Pradesh State Museum, Lucknow
