= Edith Cavell Memorial =

Public sculpture by George Frampton

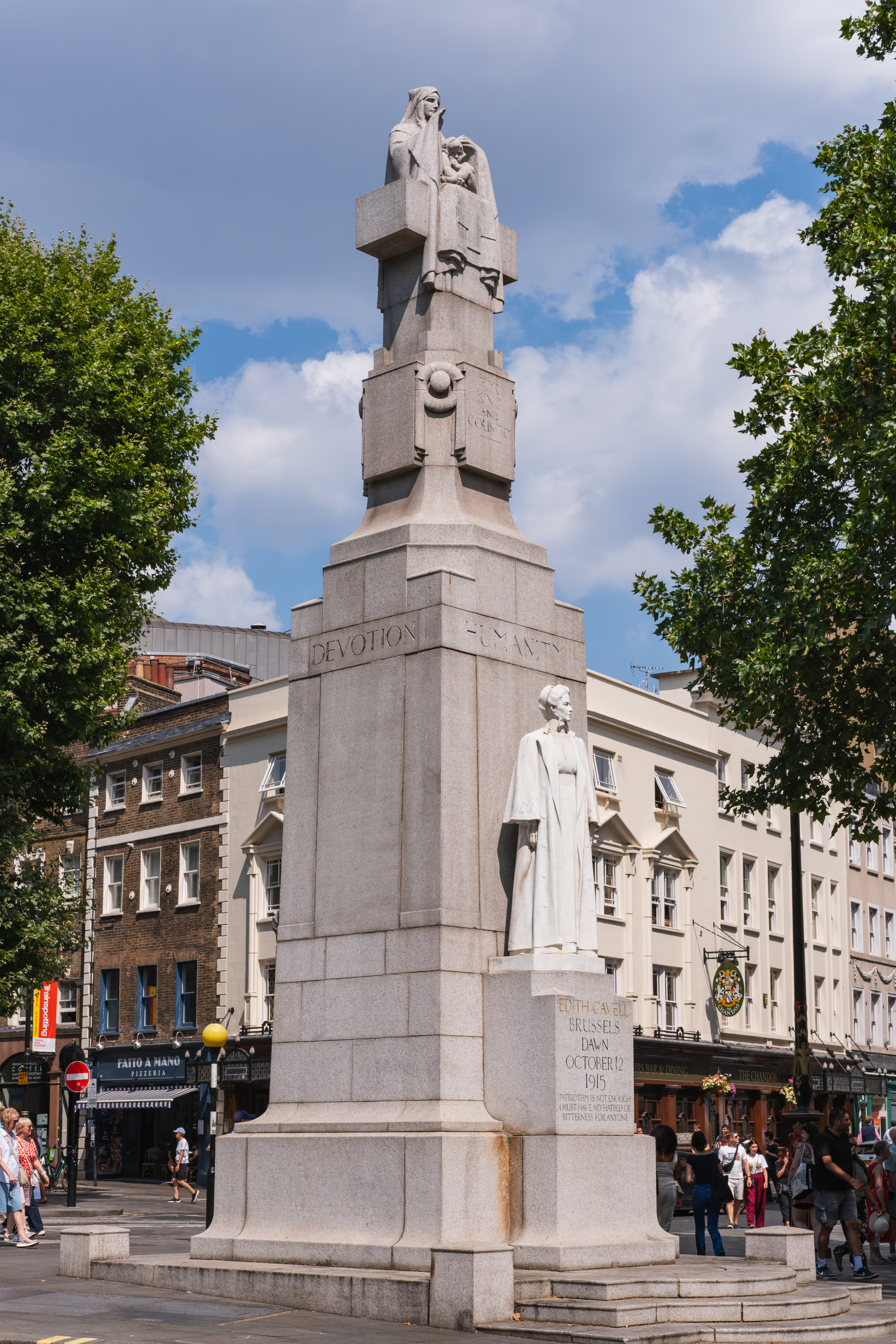
- The main sculpture and south face of the memorial in 2026
- Interactive map of Edith Cavell Memorial
- Location: St. Martin's Place, London, WC2
- Coordinates: 51°30′34″N 0°07′38″W
- Designer: George Frampton
- Type: Sculpture
- Material: Carrara marble and grey Cornish granite
- Height: 40 feet (12 m)
- Opening date: 17 March 1920
- Dedicated to: Edith Cavell

The Edith Cavell Memorial is an outdoor memorial to Edith Cavell by Sir George Frampton, in London, United Kingdom. The memorial is sited in St Martin's Place, beside the A400, just outside the northeast corner of Trafalgar Square, north of St Martin-in-the-Fields, east of the National Gallery and the National Portrait Gallery, and south of the London Coliseum. The site is adjacent to the first headquarters of the British Red Cross, originally located at 7 St Martin's Place.

== Background ==
Cavell was a British nurse from Norfolk. She was matron at Berkendael Medical Institute in Brussels when the First World War broke out in 1914. In addition to nursing soldiers from both sides without distinction, she assisted some 200 Allied soldiers to escape from German-occupied Belgium. She was arrested in August 1915, court-martialled, found guilty of treason, and shot by a German firing squad on 12 October 1915. Her story was used in British propaganda as an example of German barbarism and moral depravity. Her remains were initially buried in Belgium, but returned to Britain after the war in May 1919 for a state funeral at Westminster Abbey before she was finally buried at Norwich Cathedral.

Although Cavell's sister, Lilian Wainwright, suggested that no monuments should be erected, funds for a public memorial were raised by a committee chaired by Harry Levy-Lawson, 1st Viscount Burnham, owner of The Daily Telegraph, together with the Lord Mayor of London, the Bishop of London, and the chairman of London County Council. Sculptor Sir George Frampton accepted the commission in 1915, but declined any fee.

== Description ==
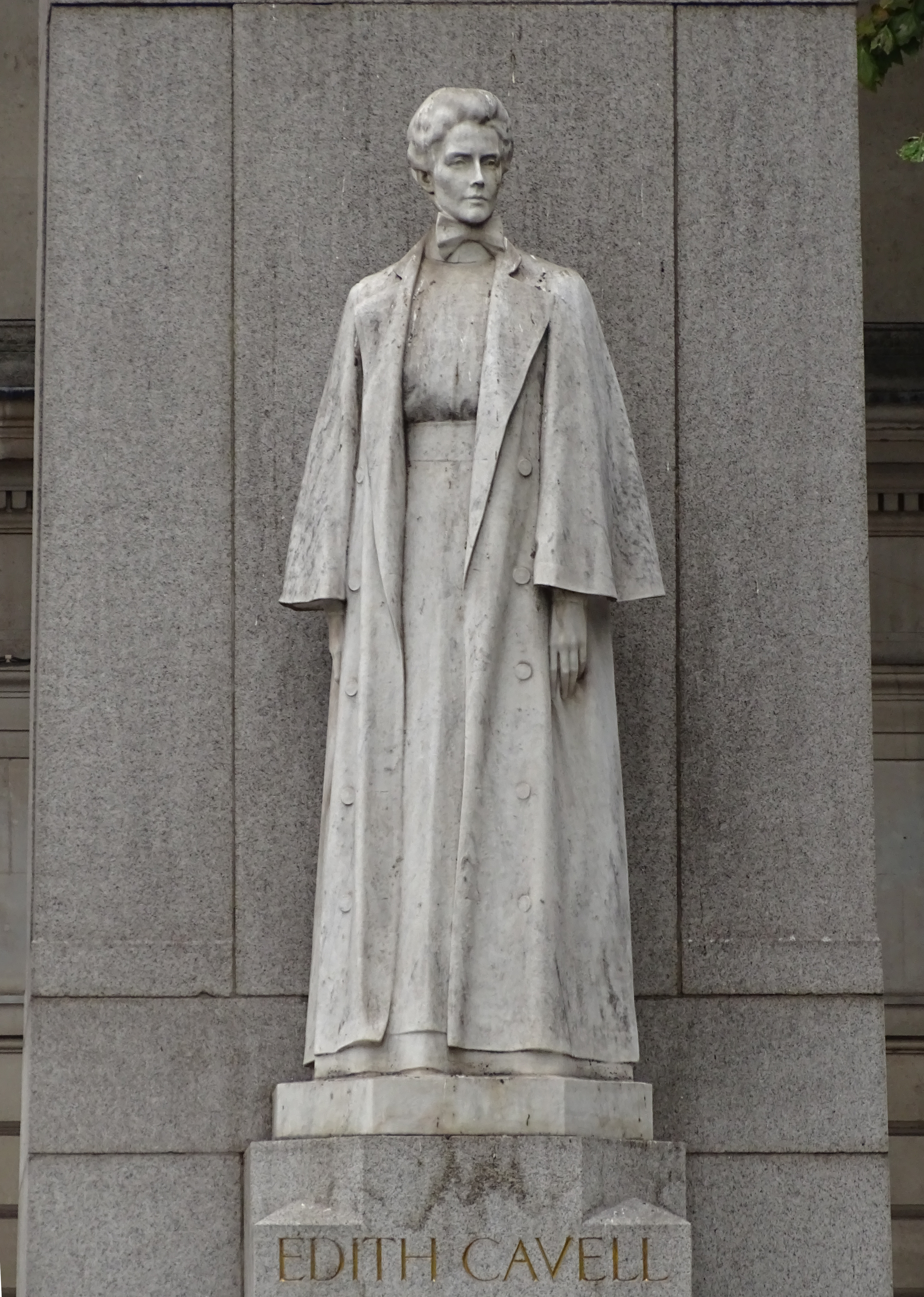
Statue detail

Frampton adopted a distinctively Modernist style for the memorial, which comprises a 10 feet (3.0 m) high statue of Cavell in her nurse's uniform sculpted from white Carrara marble, standing on a grey Cornish granite pedestal. The statue stands in front of the south side of a larger grey granite pylon which stands 40 feet (12 m) high and weighs 175 tons. The top of the block is carved into a cross and statue of a mother and child, sometimes interpreted as the Virgin and Child. The whole memorial is elevated on three steps.

On the pedestal beneath the statue of Cavell is an inscription which reads: "Edith Cavell // Brussels // Dawn // October 12th 1915 // Patriotism is not enough // I must have no hatred or // bitterness for anyone." The last three lines of the inscription quote her comment to Reverend Stirling Gahan, an Anglican chaplain who was permitted to give her Holy Communion on the night before her execution. These words were initially left off, and added in 1924 at the request of the National Council of Women.

The face of the granite block behind the statue of Cavell bears the inscription "Humanity", and higher up, below the Virgin and Child, "For King and Country". Other faces of the block bear the inscriptions, "Devotion", "Fortitude", and "Sacrifice". On the rear face of the block is a carving of a lion crushing a serpent, and higher up, the inscription, "Faithful until death".

The memorial was unveiled by Queen Alexandra on 17 March 1920. It received a Grade II listing in 1970, and was upgraded to a Grade I listing in 2014.

== See also ==
- 1920 in art
- Grade I listed war memorials in England
- Edith Cavell Memorial (Melbourne)
