= Carmarthen Furnace Bank =

Defunct bank in Wales

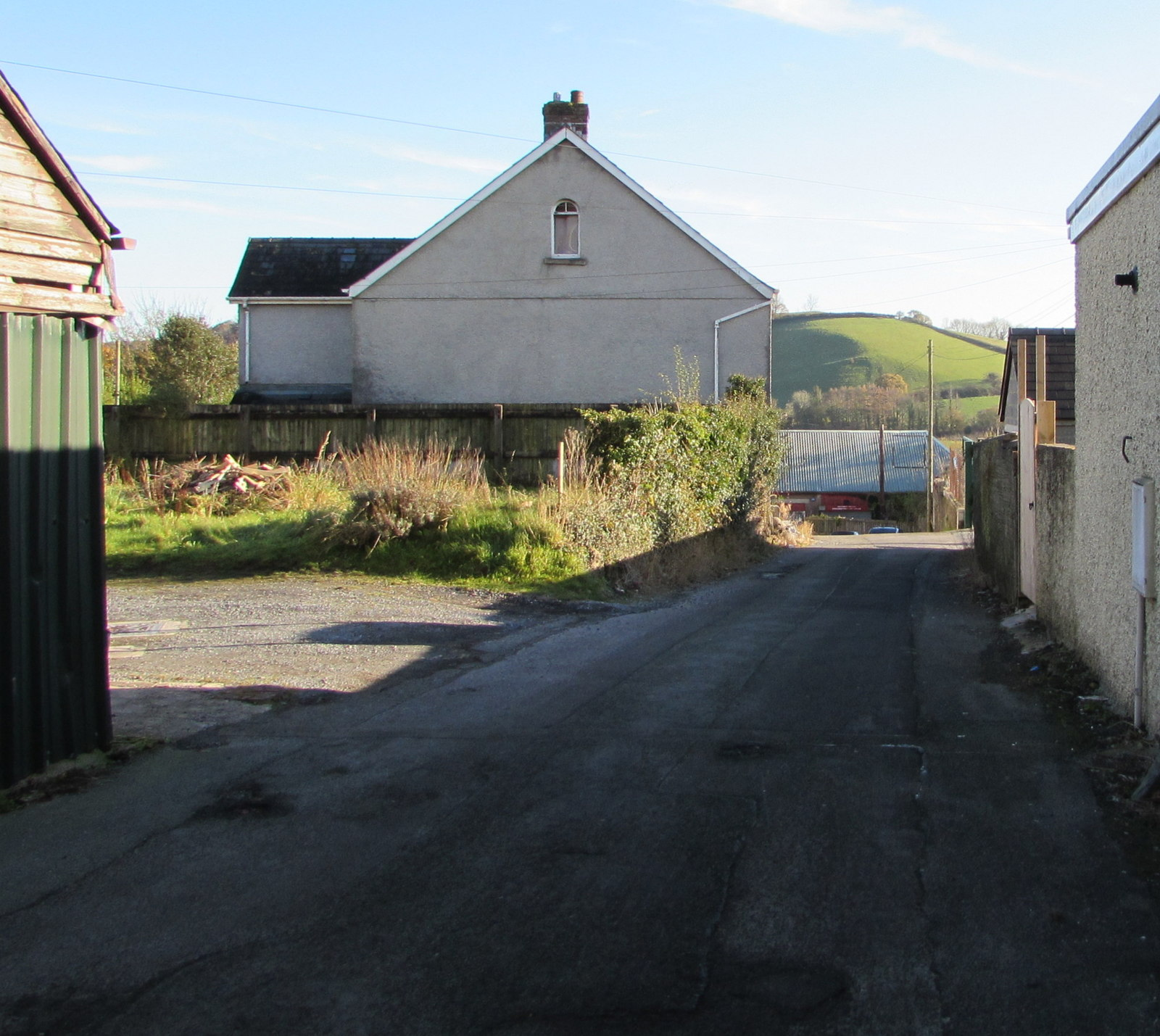

The Carmarthen Furnace Bank is a bank established in Carmarthenshire in the 18th century as a result of the efforts of a Welsh entrepreneur and businessman called John Morgan. The banking business started by issuing tokens to facilitate an iron and tin works operation and then developed into a full-fledged bank. However, few records of the works, or the bank, exist.

== Origins ==
The date of establishment of the Carmarthen Furnace Bank is unknown. However, in 1909 a copper printing plate for printing the bank's notes was found in the River Cothi. The plate is in the possession of Carmarthenshire Antiquarian Society, and a rubbing from it indicated that the bank was founded during the 1790s.

== Establishment ==
The bank was established by John Morgan, senior, the owner in 1778 of the Carmarthen Tin Works, who also issued a number of copper tokens to help his business at the works.

His father, Robert Morgan, had established the Cwmdwyfran Iron Works and John Morgan, senior, continued the works for many years. The date of origin of these works is not known, but the works was producing in 1740. In 1750, 120 tons of bar-iron were manufactured. The remains of the Iron Works at Furnace Bank are now located in a builder’s merchants yards and were built by Robert Morgan in 1748. The foundry made guns and shot for the Board of Ordnance until 1760. The tin mills were added in 1761, and tin plate production continued until 1900.

Cwmdwyfran Iron Works was engraved on some of the tokens issued by the Works, in 1792, in order to facilitate the business. These were payable in London, Bristol and Carmarthen. The only known illustration of the Cwmdwyfran Iron Works is the engraving contained on the copper tokens. Although the making of such coins was illegal, the shortage of small coins had become so acute that in 1792, the prohibition was, in many cases, ignored.

In a letter written in 1899 by Mrs C. I. W. Morgan, wife of Mr Charles Morgan (the last male of his line), she states that, on looking through some old papers, she found a legal permission to Mr John Morgan of Furnace House, Carmarthen, to start a bank in that town, but the letter contains no other details of this document, or its date.

The proceedings of the Great Sessions held at Glamorganshire on 22 March 1796, indicate that a man named John Watkins, employed as a guard on the Cardiff mail coach to Swansea, was charged and convicted of grand larceny. Messrs. Morgan, bankers at Carmarthen, gave evidence that they sent to London for a remittance in cash which was packed in a box and sent down in the mail coach. It was proved that the box was put on the coach at Cardiff but was missing at Swansea. John Watkins denied the theft, but on a constable saying that ‘he must have been the man for that basket in which the money was packed was found in his house’, he gave himself away by replying ’No, that cannot be true, for there was no basket about the money.’ This evidences the fact that the bank was carrying-on business, and was established before, 1796.

== Bank notes ==
The printing plate found in the River Cothi is for printing £5 bank notes, and it is probable that notes of a lower denomination were also issued. No specimens of any bank note from the bank are known to exist.

== Amalgamation ==
The letter written in 1899 by Mrs C. I. W. Morgan also states that the bank was afterwards sold to Mr. David Morris of Carmarthen.

David Morris amalgamated the bank with his existing banking business, styled David Morris & Sons. David Morris & Sons was later named Carmarthen Bank, probably after the failure of the bank of the same name, conducted by Waters, Jones & Co.

David Morris left the bank to his cousins, who later parted with it to the National Provincial Bank of England.

== Other Carmarthenshire banks ==
Other Carmarthenshire banks include Carmarthen Bank, Llandovery Bank, Llanelly Bank, Marten & Co., and David Morris & Sons.
