= Carmarthen Bank =

Defunct bank in Wales

Carmarthen Bank was a bank established and formerly operated in the county of Carmarthenshire, Wales during the 19th century. It became bankrupt in 1832 and its name was then adopted by another Carmarthenshire-based bank.

== History ==
This bank was established in Carmarthen by the partnership known as Waters, Jones & Co., and probably developed from one or more earlier banks operated under the name of Waters and variously referred to in the London Directory, for the years 1811–1816, as Waters; Waters & Co.; R. & R. Waters; and Thomas Waters & Sons.

During the Panic of 1825, the Bank of England suspended cash payments due to frequent provincial bank failures, leading to a general run on British banks in December 1825. In December 1825, public meetings were held at the Guildhall, Carmarthen and at Llandeilo, where votes of public confidence were passed in Waters, Jones & Co. and David Morris & Sons. Both enterprises survived the 1825 crisis but, on 19 January 1832, Waters, Jones & Co. suspended all payments. The partners in Carmarthen Bank at this time were John Waters, Arthur Jones and David Jones, all of Carmarthen.

Attempts were made to avoid bankruptcy, and on 7 February 1832, an agreement was drawn up which recited that the accounts had been inspected on 21 January 1832, and that assets were sufficient to meet liabilities. Under this agreement, Waters, Jones & Co. would meet all the assets of Carmarthen Bank under the supervision of inspectors, who were to receive the proceeds of realisation of the assets on trust for the bank's creditors. This agreement contained a proviso that if the partners of Sir James Esdaile & Co., bankers of Lombard Street, London, and certain other creditors holding nine-tenths of the value of the bank's debts, did not execute the agreement before 1 May 1832, the agreement would be void and a commission of bankruptcy would be issued against Waters, Jones & Co. Although the partners in the bank, and some of the creditors, signed the agreement, the partners of Sir James Esdaile & Co., who were owed a large amount, did not. A fiat of bankruptcy was issued, and the notes exhibited at the Ivy Bush Hotel, Carmarthen on 11 September 1832, when a first dividend of 5 shillings in the pound was paid.

According to one authority, the liabilities of Waters, Jones & Co. amounted to £300,000, and the failure of the bank was the result of ‘issuing notes to the extent of nearly £100,000 upon unmarketable securities, and making advances in opposition to every principle of common sense and common safety. Money was freely lent, without security, to drovers to enable them to purchase cattle, and the wants of a large agricultural district were soothed in a similarly paternal manner.’ It may be that such harsh criticism was due to the writer being a heavy depositor in the bank.

== Successor in name ==
It was probably after the failure of Carmarthen Bank that David Morris adopted the name, and changed the name of his bank from David Morris & Sons to Carmarthen Bank. David Morris & Sons had been formed from the amalgamation of Morris & Sons, which he had established in Carmarthen, in 1791, and Carmarthen Furnace Bank, which had been established by John Morgan of Furnace House, Carmarthen.

== Bank notes ==
The earliest known bank note for this bank is for £2 and is dated 10 October 1825. Existing specimens of bank notes issued by the bank are for £1, £2, £5, £8, and £50. So far as is known, it is the only bank in England or Wales that issued an £8 bank note.

== Other Carmarthenshire banks ==
Other Carmarthenshire banks include: Carmarthen Furnace Bank, Llandovery Bank, Llanelly Bank, and David Morris & Sons.
