= Charles Mabey =

Charles Mabey may refer to:

- Charles R. Mabey (1877–1959), American politician, governor of Utah
- Charles Henry Mabey (1835–1912), English sculptor and medallist
