= Gibson Hall, London =

Listed building in the City of London

Coordinates: 51.5147°N 0.0836°W

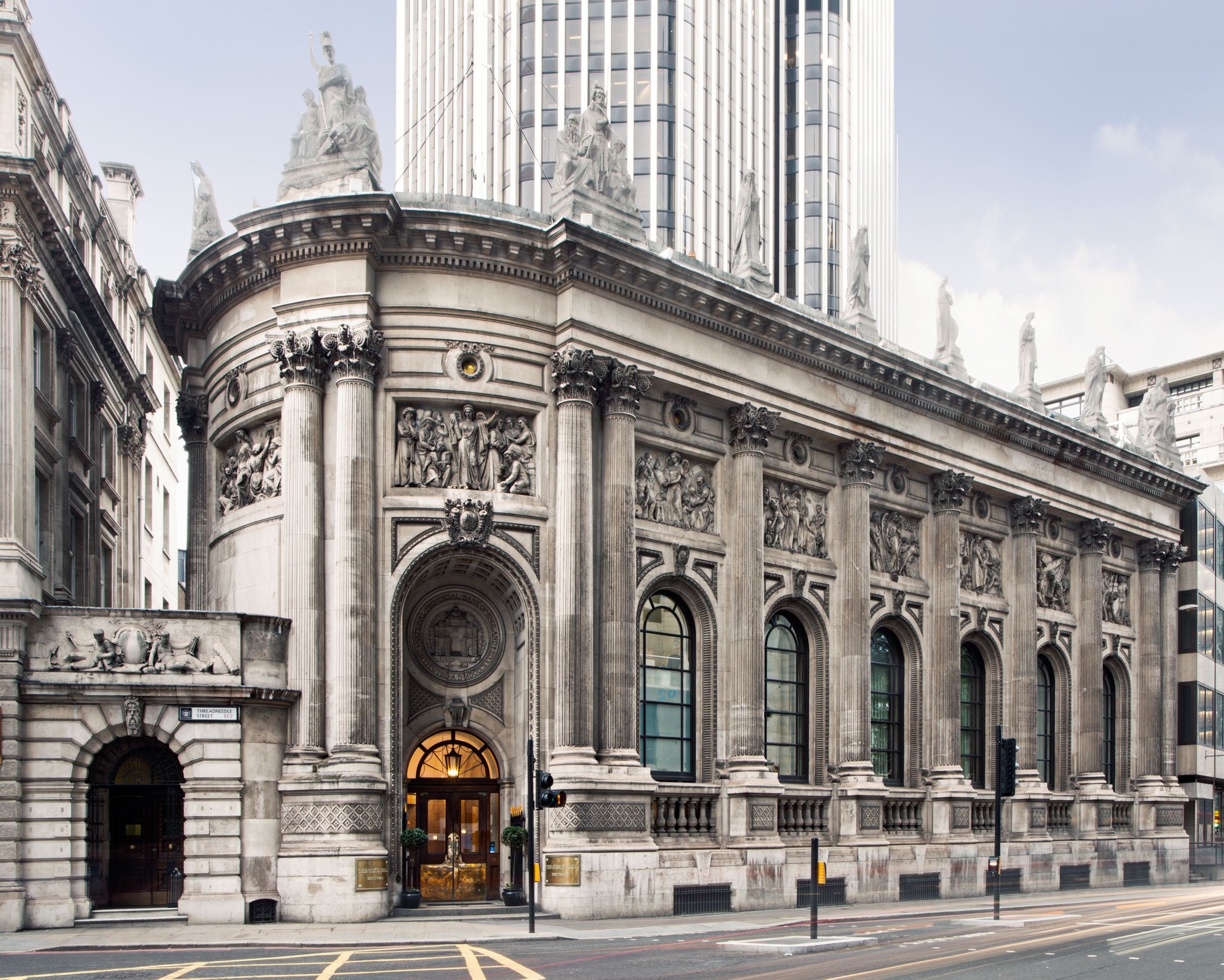
Frontage with entrance at rounded south-west corner

The Gibson Hall is a Grade I listed building at 13 Bishopsgate in the City of London. Previously known as National Westminster Hall, the building is named after its architect, John Gibson.

Built of Portland stone in the classical style with engaged Corinthian columns, the building was commissioned as a new head office by the directors of the National Provincial Bank of England and completed in 1865.

Opening in 1866, there were only 4 arched bays and just seven figures stood atop. The additional two-bay extension and rooftop figures, Shipbuilding and Mining designed by Charles Henry Mabey, were added in 1878, relocating the figure for London so that it remained at the corner of the then newly extended building.

The exterior elevation features eight panels of allegorical scenes in high relief representing the achievements of mankind: the Arts, Commerce, Science, Manufactures, Agriculture, Navigation, Shipbuilding and Mining. Standing figures along the roof line represent various important cities in which the bank did business, including Manchester, Birmingham, Dover, Newcastle and London. The building was listed in 1950 for its special architectural and historic interest.

In 1967, the National Provincial Bank moved its head office to Drapers Gardens, 12 Throgmorton Avenue. The banking hall served its original purpose until 1982, when it was restored and converted into an assembly room for National Westminster Bank. From its disposal in 1998, it has operated as an events hosting venue available for hire to the general public. It is currently closed and no longer listed as available as a venue for hire.
