= Robert Jackson (sculptor) =

English sculptor

- Born: 1824; Norwich, Norfolk, England
- Died: 1905 (aged 80–81); England
- Known for: Sculpture

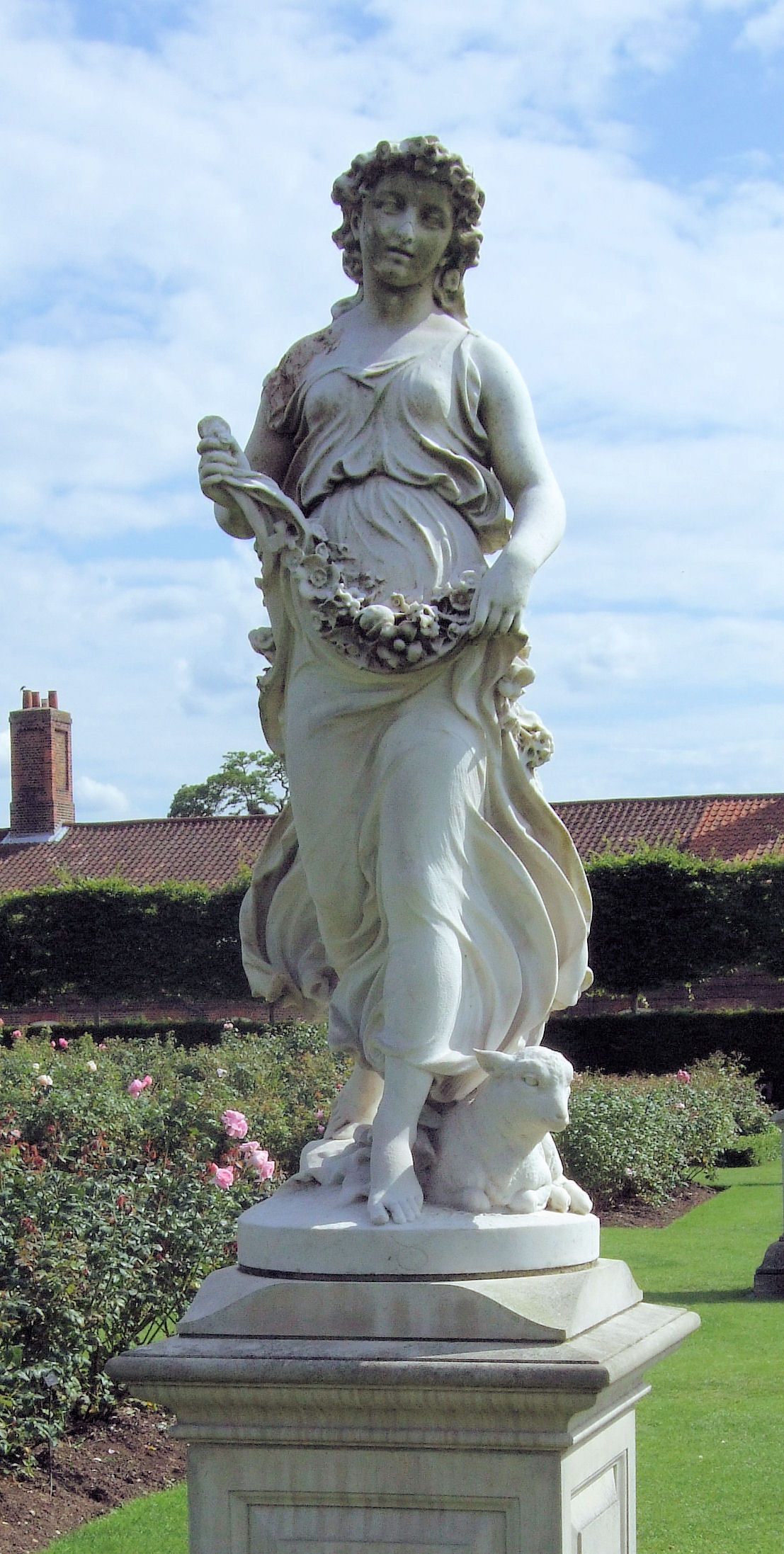
Summer in the grounds of Hampton Court Palace by Jackson.

Robert Jackson (1824–1905) was an English sculptor, primarily working in portrait sculpture.

== Biography ==
Robert Jackson was born Norwich in 1824, possibly the son of a stonemason also named Robert Jackson. He worked in providing a number of sculptures for memorials and monuments, as well as decorative figurative sculpture, often associated with significant buildings. This included working under John Thomas on the sculpture for the new Palace of Westminster at a young age. He worked in Rome from 1860 to 1863 but managed to maintain an address in London. Other significant works include a monument to Robert Anderson in Glasgow Cathedral, a marble statue of Francis Henry Campbell held by the Victoria & Albert Museum, several sculptures in the grounds of Hampton Court Palace and a statue of Lord Palmerston in Westminster Abbey, which was his last significant commission. Jackson is also sometimes credited for The Boy, a drinking fountain in St James's Park; however, that was substantially the work of Charles Henry Mabey working under him.
