= Llandovery Bank =

Defunct bank in Wales

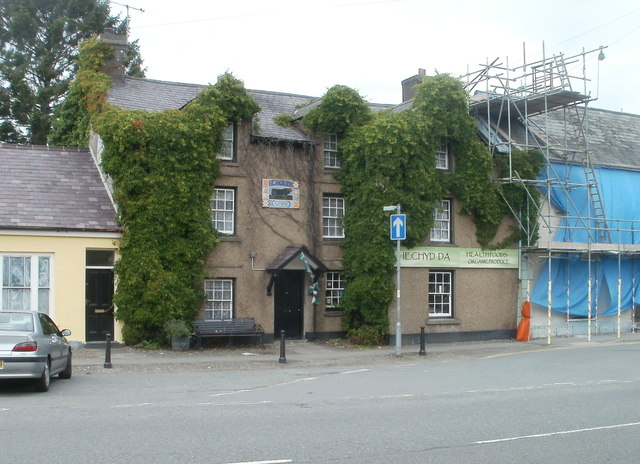

The Llandovery Bank was established in 1799 in Llandovery, Wales, in the premises known as the King’s Head on Stone Street (comprising the rear range of the present building), where it remained for many years. The bank was locally known as the ‘Black Ox Bank’ (‘Banc yr Eidion Du’ in the Welsh language) because of the bank notes having been embellished with an engraving on the left hand side of a Welsh black ox.

== Establishment and ownership ==
The bank’s founder was David Jones, a farmer’s son, who started business at age 15 years. He became a drover, and later married Anne, the daughter of Rhys Jones of Cilrhedin, who brought with her a fortune of £10,000. This, together with the money he had already made, enabled David Jones to found Llandovery Bank, when he was around 40 years old. He had two sons, Evan (who died unmarried, in 1820) and John (who died in 1813).

David Jones died in 1839, having amassed a fortune of £140,000, and the provisions of his will provided for the bank to be continued by his grandsons (the sons of John Jones). The eldest grandson, also called David Jones, continued the Llandovery Bank, and his brothers William and John, respectively, founded branches at Lampeter and Llandeilo, under the title ‘David Jones & Co.’.

On the death of the three brothers, the three banks, and their sub-branches, became the property of Gerwyn Jones, the son of David Jones and, in 1903, upon the death of Gerwyn Jones, the banks were devised to Mrs Mary Eleanor Geraldine Davies-Evans. In 1909 the goodwill of the banks was sold to Lloyds Bank Ltd., thus ending the existence of the last of the surviving private banks in West Wales.

== Size of the bank ==
The Black Ox Bank was one of the earliest banks established in Carmarthenshire, and had more branches than any other private bank of its period in the county.

The branch at Llandeilo was established by 1842, and by 1887 had moved into a purpose-built building, by J Calder of London, a plain but substantial building with iron-bound doors, denoting security. The original banking hall and vaults remain, and the building is now the office of a financial services company. The former ‘Nag’s Head’ hotel, to the left of the bank, was owned by the bank and remodelled in 1887, ‘to be convenient to those waiting to do business’.

There was probably no bank of its era which enjoyed more local credit than the Black Ox Bank and it is said that, in the Panic of 1825, when there was a run on many banks across the country, a timid client entered the Black Ox Bank to withdraw his money. The bank, in anticipation of a run against it, had just received a consignment of Bank of England notes, and the cashier, on receiving the cheque, handed over to the client Bank of England bank notes for the amount. The depositor, however, refused to accept the notes tendered and demanded instead, notes of the Black Ox Bank.

== Bank notes ==
It is not known what denominations of notes the bank issued from the existing specimens available, however, it is certain that notes were issued for £1, £2, £5, £5 5s., and £20, each bearing a black ox in the left hand corner. Public confidence in the Bank made it a popular target for counterfeiters from an early date, and some counterfeit notes have also survived.

== Other Carmarthenshire banks ==
Other Carmarthenshire banks include Llanelly Bank, David Morris & Sons, Carmarthen Bank, Carmarthen Furnace Bank and Marten & Co.

== See also ==
- Drovers' road
