= The Boy (fountain) =

Sculptural fountain in St James's Park, London

Coordinates: 51.501187°N 0.134105°W

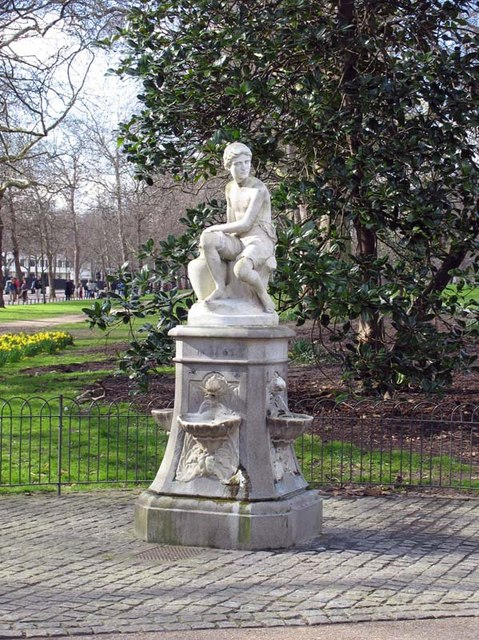
- Artist: Charles Henry Mabey
- Completion date: 1863
- Location: St James's Park, London

Listed Building – Grade II
- Official name: The Boy Fountain, North of Birdcage Walk/Queen Anne's Gate Junction
- Designated: 1 December 1987
- Reference no.: 1235671

The Boy is a Grade II listed drinking fountain with sculpture by Charles Henry Mabey in St James's Park, London, across Birdcage Walk from Queen Anne's Gate.

The fountain has a marble sculpture of a boy (sometimes called a "Greek boy") with a pitcher and holding a scallop shell; he is naked except for his breeches. The figure is set on a granite pedestal which has marble panels on three sides. On the panels are stylised dolphin heads, which would originally have spouted water into the projecting conch shells, against a background of bullrushes.

The fountain was installed in 1863 by the Office of Works, under William Cowper as First Commissioner of Works; another example of improvements the office was carrying out at the same time is Alexander Munro's Boy and Dolphin fountain in Hyde Park. The sculptor of The Boy was Charles Henry Mabey, working under Robert Jackson.

There are reports of damage to the sculpture in 1905, 1906 and 1925, and the current head, right arm, left hand and both big toes are replacements made in the late 20th century. The most recent unveiling of the repaired sculpture was on 22 December 1993 by Douglas Hurd. Following plans for the Memorial to Elizabeth II which will use the site, The Boy is to be moved to the western end of the park.

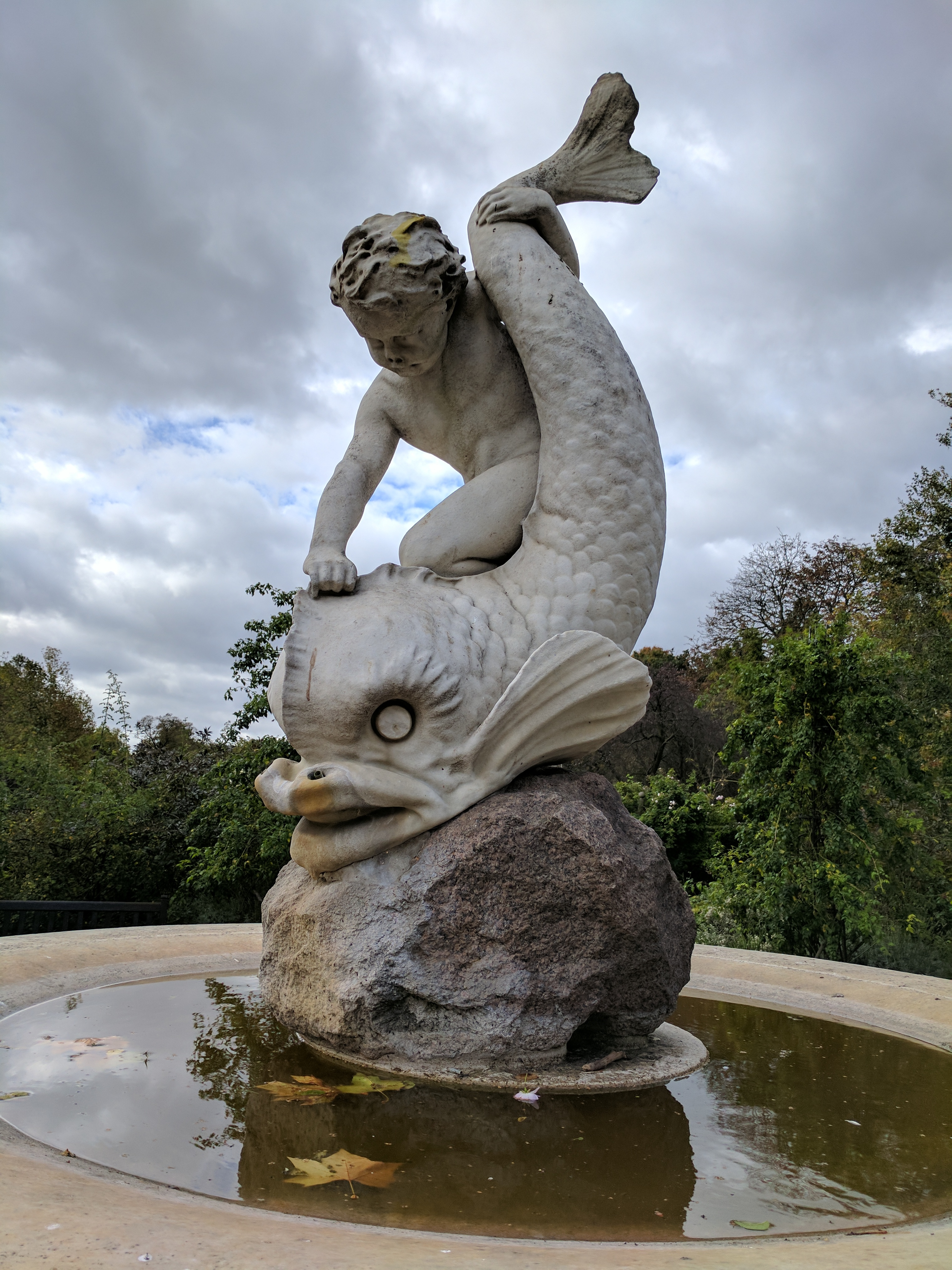
The Boy and Dolphin fountain in Hyde Park (Alexander Munro, 1863)
