= David Morris & Sons =

Defunct bank in Wales

David Morris & Sons was a bank which was established in Carmarthenshire, Wales in the 18th century. It now a constituent part of The Royal Bank of Scotland Group.

== History ==
David Morris was born around 1745-6 and was the son of David Morris of the Ferry Inn at Llansteffan in Carmarthenshire. He was a Carmarthen merchant and in 1787 he became the Agent for Sir Herbert Mackworth and others, who had opened a banking house in Carmarthen.

By 1788 David Morris was working as a banker on his own account. In 1791 he took over a Carmarthen bank established by a person named David Parry and operated it under the name of Morris & Sons

David Morris carried-on his banking business in Dark Gate, Carmarthen. As the business expanded, it moved to a larger house in King Street and finally to Spilman Street, where the bank remained until it was taken over, in 1871.

It is likely that David Morris also acquired the Carmarthen Furnace Bank, amalgamating the two banks to form a successful business carried on under the name David Morris & Sons and it was probably after the failure of Carmarthen Bank, which was owned by Waters, Jones & Co., that David Morris & Sons changed its name to Carmarthen Bank.

David Morris died suddenly while on a visit to Swansea, on 25 September 1805, aged 59 years, and is buried at Saint Mary’s Church, Swansea. After his death the banking business was carried on by his sons. During the Panic of 1825 the Bank of England suspended cash payments, as a result of frequent provincial bank failures. This led to a general run on British banks, in December 1825. It is unclear if David Morris & Sons suffered during this crisis, but on 22 December 1825, a public meeting was held at the Guildhall, Carmarthen, where a vote of public confidence was passed in this bank and Waters, Jones & Co. A similar meeting was also held, on 26 December 1825, at Llandeilo.

== Takeover ==
David Morris & Sons survived the Panic of 1825 and continued to operate successfully, until 28 November 1864, when the National Provincial Bank of England, Ltd., the pioneer of the big joint stock banks, first opened a branch in Carmarthen. On 2 October 1871, the banking business was transferred to the National Provincial Bank of England when the sons of David Morris retired.

== Successor in title ==
David Morris & Sons is a past constituent of The Royal Bank of Scotland Group, who hold the archives for the bank.

== Bank notes ==
There are no records of any surviving bank notes from this bank.

== Other Carmarthenshire banks ==
Other Carmarthenshire banks include: Carmarthen Furnace Bank, Carmarthen Bank, Llandovery Bank, Llanelly Bank, and Marten & Co.
