= Llanelly Bank =

Defunct bank in Wales

Llanelly Bank was a 19th-century bank based in the Welsh town of Llanelli. The bank used the then-standard Anglicised spelling of the town's name.

== History ==
Little is known about the history of Llanelly Bank. However, the House of Lords Sessional Papers, of 1801-1833, record that the bank's licence was renewed in 1812, and that it was granted to Richard Pemberton, the Elder of Barnes, Durham, Ralph Stephen Pemberton of Llanelly, Carmarthenshire, and Richard Pemberton, the Younger of Castle Street, Holborn, London.

By 1822, the bank appeared to be a branch or subsidiary enterprise of 'Swansea Bank, Glamorganshire' because, by then, both banks were run by the same partnership, known as 'Haynes, Day, Haynes and Lawrence'.

The bank appears to have closed by 1830, as no mention is made of it, or any other bank in Llanelli, in Pigot & Co's 'Commercial Directory' for that year.

== Bank notes ==
Up to 1916, there appeared to be only one Llanelly Bank note in existence, for the sum £1 1s. All enquiries at that time failed to reveal any further notes, or information, regarding the history of the bank. However, a number of Llanelly Bank notes have come up for auction:

- In 2006, Spink and Son auctioned a very fine, and rare, £1 note with serial number 660, dated 10 March 1825. This bank note was in black and white, with a classical frieze in the centre and initials top left in an oval frame, with the value low left. It was printed for Day, Haynes and Lawrence.
- In 2000, Philips auctioned a Llanelly Bank note dated 1823, having a frieze at the centre and a seated woman with an anchor at the top. The note has bankruptcy stamps on either side. The bankruptcy stamps appear to confirm that the bank went out of business prior to 1830.

== Other Carmarthenshire banks ==
Other Carmarthenshire banks include: Carmarthen Furnace Bank, Carmarthen Bank, Llandovery Bank, Marten & Co., David Morris & Sons, and Wilkins & Co.
