= Thomas Joplin =

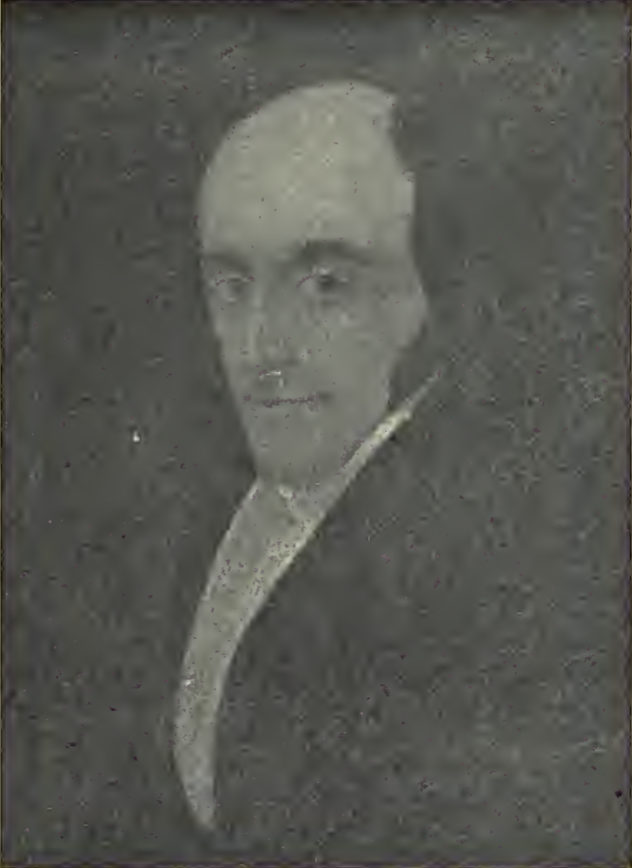
Thomas Joplin

Thomas Joplin (1790?–1847) was an English timber merchant and banker, resident in Newcastle upon Tyne, notable as an early and persistent promoter of the concept of the joint stock bank.

== Life ==
He was born about 1790 in Newcastle-upon-Tyne, the second son of the timber merchant Thomas Joplin, who died in 1808. He was in business at the family firm in New Road with his elder brother William, as W. and T. Joplin & Co. He studied political economy.

In 1824 the Provincial Bank of Ireland was formed in London, and Joplin became actively concerned in its management. In 1828, shortly after joint-stock banks were permitted 65 miles from London, Joplin left the Provincial Bank of Ireland, and submitted a scheme to his cousin George Fife Angas for the association of a number of provincial banks together under a central management, but with considerable local freedom of action. He proposed to call the new concern the National Provincial Bank of England. The estimated expense of initiating the scheme was £300, which Angas in 1829 engaged to find. The plan was carried out in 1833, when the National Provincial Bank was established; Joplin's name was in the deed of settlement as one of the directors and as the originator of the bank.

Joplin helped to establish banks at Lancaster, Huddersfield, Bradford, Manchester and elsewhere. Some were successful, but he made little money from his efforts. About 1836 a dispute with his fellow-directors led to his leaving the National Provincial Bank.

Joplin died at Böhmischdorf in Silesia, where he had gone for his health, on 12 April 1847.

== Works ==
Joplin published at Newcastle in 1822 An Essay on the General Principles and Present Practices of Banking in England and Scotland; with Observations upon the Justice and Policy of an immediate Alteration in the Charter of the Bank of England, and the Measures to be pursued in order to effect it. This work explained the system of Scottish banking, and suggested the establishment of a joint-stock bank; it went through several editions.

This pamphlet launched a strong attack on the monopoly position of the Bank of England and proposed the setting up of joint stock banks. These ideas were subsequently taken up to a certain extent in the system initiated in 1828. It was followed by many others. In his book Thomas Joplin and Classical Economics (1993), Denis Patrick O'Brien shows that Joplin was ahead of his time in his use of formal models and empirically tested predictions.

Further works by Joplin were:

- An essay on the general principles and present practice of banking in England and Scotland. Ridgeway. 1822.
- Outlines of a System of Political Economy: Written with a View to Prove to Government and the Country, that the Cause of the Present Agricultural Distress is Entirely Artificial, and to Suggest a Plan for the Management of the Currency ... Together with the Fourth Edition of An Essay on the Principles of Banking. Baldwin, Cradock, and Joy. 1823.
- Views on the subject of Corn and Currency, Newcastle-on-Tyne, 1826.
- Views on the Corn Bill of 1827, and other Measures of Government; together with a further Exposition of certain Principles on Corn and Currency before published, 1828.
- An Analysis and History of the Currency Question; together with an Account of the Origin and Growth of Joint-stock Banking in England, 1832.
- A Letter to the Directors of the National Provincial Bank of England, 1834.
- Case for Parliamentary Inquiry into the circumstances of the [Financial] Panic [of 1825], in a Letter, &c., 1835?
- An Examination of the Report of the Joint Stock Bank Committee. J. Ridgway and Sons. 1837 [1836]. ISBN 978-1-362-49894-0.
- On our Monetary System …; with an Explanation of the Causes by which the Pressures in the Money Market are produced, and a Plan for their Remedy, 2nd edit. 1840.
- The Cause and Cure of our Commercial Embarrassments, 1841.
- An Essay on the Condition of the National Provincial Bank of England, with a view to its Improvement, 1843.
- Currency Reform: Improvement, not Depreciation, 1844.
- An Examination of Sir Robert Peel's Currency Bill of 1844, 2nd edit., with supplementary observations, 1845.
- Circular to the Directors and Managers of the Joint-stock Banks; containing a brief Explanation of the Advantages that would result from the Government adopting as its own the Circulation of all the Banks of Issue in the Three Kingdoms, 3rd edit. 1845.

== Secondary sources ==
- Denis Patrick O'Brien (1993). Thomas Joplin and Classical Macroeconomics: A Re-Appraisal of Classical Monetary Thought. E. Elgar Pub. ISBN 978-1-85278-676-2.
- Blaug, Mark (ed.) (1999) - Who's who in economics (3rd edition).

== Notes ==
Attribution

This article incorporates text from a publication now in the public domain: Lee, Sidney, ed. (1892). "Joplin, Thomas". Dictionary of National Biography. Vol. 30. London: Smith, Elder & Co.
