= Robert Morgan (ironmaster) =

Welsh ironmaster (1707–1778)

- Born: 1707
- Died: 1777 (aged 69–70)
- Occupation: Ironmaster
- Children: 3

Robert Morgan (1707 – 1777) was an ironmaster and tinplate manufacturer in Carmarthen, South Wales, and the surrounding area. He owned the Carmarthen furnace, as well as forges at Kidwelly, Whitland and Cwmdwyfran.

== Early life ==
Morgan was born in Kidwelly in 1707.

== Career ==
=== Cwmdwyfran Ironworks ===
Robert Morgan founded Cwmdwyfran Ironworks before 1740. It is located on the River Gwili to the northeast of Carmarthen. The works were fueled by charcoal from timber from the Cwmdwyfran area. The annual production of the forge was 100–200 tons of bar-iron. Robert's sons ran the ironworks after his death, leasing the forge to Mr. Reynolds and Mr. Smith, until its closure in 1830.

=== Kidwelly Iron and Tin Works ===
An ironworks was built in Kidwelly at the end of the 17th Century, including a blast furnace. It was owned by Henry Owen in 1720 and not very prolific. Robert Morgan bought the forge in 1748. His success at this forge led to him establishing the Carmarthen ironworks. In 1750, the forge produced 100 tons of bar-iron.

The works were rebuilt a few years later to also manufacture tinplates. In 1758, Morgan entered into partnership with Lewis Rogers of Kidwelly to run the tin works. Iron produced at the Carmarthen furnace was refined at forges and then sent to Kidwelly for rolling and tinning. Morgan and Rogers disagreed, and, in November 1761, Morgan's involvement in the tin works was severed, but he still owned the forge in Kidwelly.

=== Carmarthen Iron and Tin Works ===
Robert Morgan rented the site of Carmarthen Priory from Lady Trevor to build an ironworks, which opened in 1748. The site was powered by a water-wheel working a large pair of bellows, and included a blast furnace built from the debris of the one at Whitland.

In 1757, Robert Morgan produced guns and shot for the Seven Years' War, but, by 1759, he was back to primarily producing iron for tin-plate.

He began building a tin-mill on the site in 1759, which was completed in 1761. On 5th May 1761, the first plate was tinned. Soon after, he built a second rolling mill, increasing the output capacity to 5,000 boxes of tin-plate per year. However, the mill rarely ran at full capacity as Morgan struggled to find buyers, particularly due to competition with the Kidwelly Tin Works.

Tin was brought to the site from Cornwall and coal from Lancashire. The product was primarily sold in Bristol.

In 1771, Morgan bought the furnace and mills from Lady Trevor for £4000.

After Robert's death, his son John Morgan ran the ironworks, and, in 1788, the site produced 400 tons of bar-iron. In 1800, he passed the responsibility to his son, also called John Morgan. At this time, blackplate and rolled bars were the main products of the works. The coal was imported from Kidwelly on three sloops called William, Dragon and Mary Ann.

The tinworks were still functional in 1805. In 1808, the stock was valued at £8000. The works were sold to Mr. Reynolds and Mr. Smith, who also leased Cwmdwyfran forge. In 1823, the tin works were destroyed in a fire. In 1826, they moved the tin production to Aberavon.

The blast furnace at Carmarthen is now a Grade II listed building.

An iron bell produced by the Carmarthen Iron and Tin Works in 1802 is in the Carmarthenshire County Museum.

=== Other endeavours ===
In 1747, Morgan leased land in Llanelli to mine coal, which was taken to Carmarthen.

== Personal life ==
Morgan lived in Kidwelly, and then moved to Furnace House in Carmarthen in 1761. He had three sons: Robert (1738), John (1739–1805) and Charles (1743–87), and died in 1777.
