= National Provincial Bank =

British retail bank

National Provincial Bank Limited
- Coat of arms of National Provincial Bank

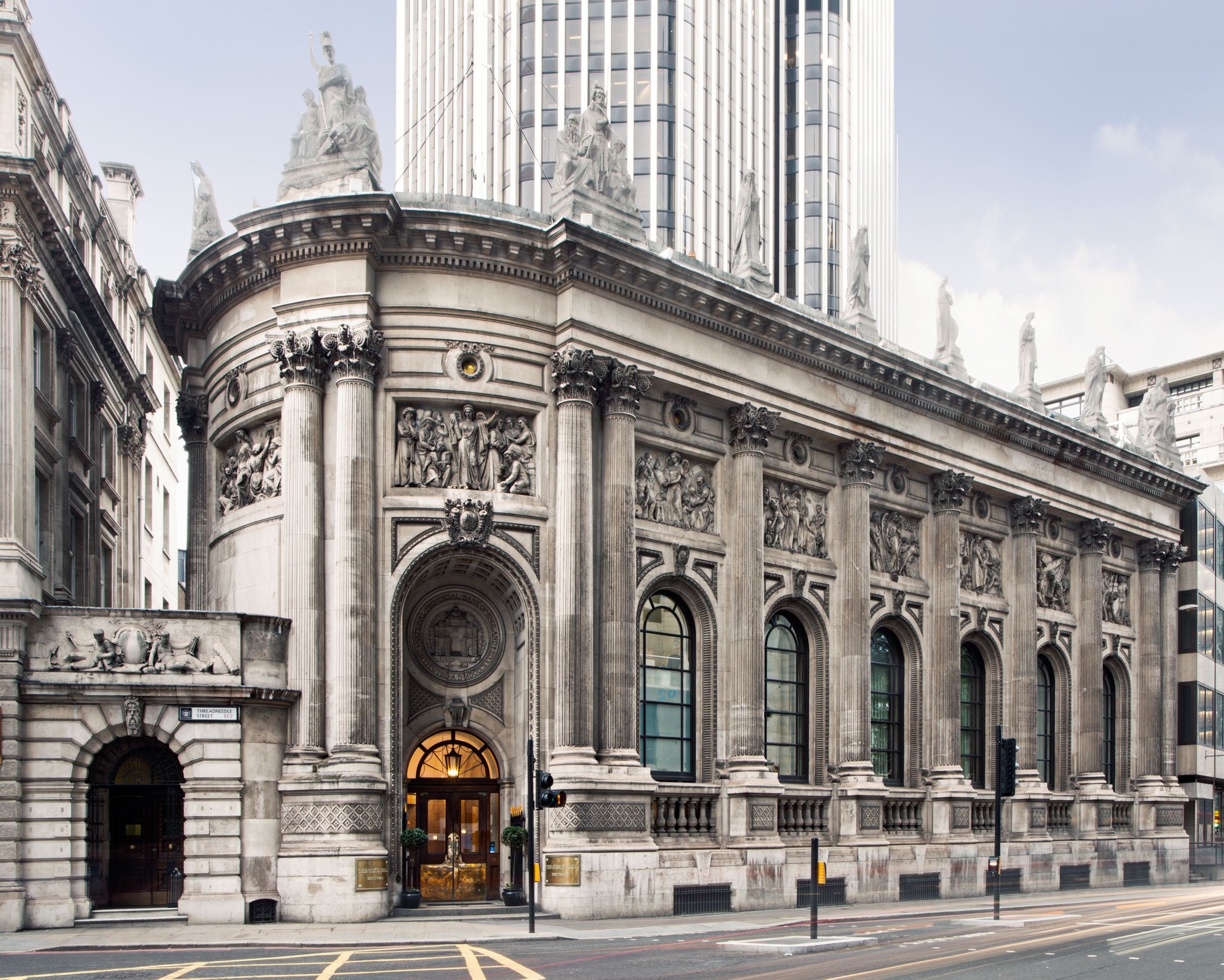
- Gibson Hall, London, completed in 1865 as the head office of the National Provincial Bank of England
- Type: Joint-stock
- Industry: Banking
- Founded: 1833; 193 years ago
- Defunct: 1970; 56 years ago
- Fate: Merger with Westminster Bank
- Successor: National Westminster Bank
- Headquarters: 15 Bishopsgate, London EC2
- Subsidiaries: District Bank Limited

National Provincial Bank was a retail bank which operated in England and Wales. It was created in 1833 as National Provincial Bank of England, and expanded largely by taking over a number of other banks. Following the transformative acquisition of the Union Bank of London in 1918, it changed its name to National Provincial and Union Bank of England, then in 1924 shortened its name again to National Provincial Bank. It further acquired Coutts Bank in 1920, Grindlays Bank in 1924, Isle of Man Bank in 1961, District Bank in 1962, thus becoming one of the "Big Five" that dominated the UK banking sector for much of the 20th century, together with Barclays Bank, Lloyds Bank, Midland Bank and Westminster Bank. On 1 January 1970, it completed its merger with Westminster Bank to form National Westminster Bank.

For most of its history, National Provincial Bank was headquartered in London on Bishopsgate, at junction with Threadneedle Street.

== History ==
=== Origins and early growth ===
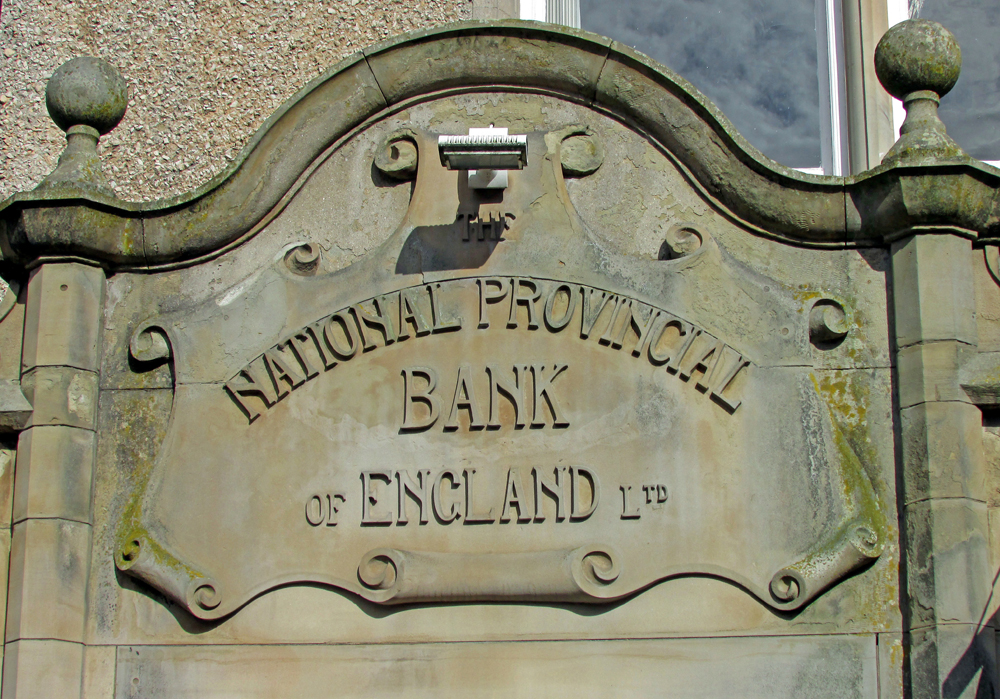
Carved headstone at the Holyhead branch in Anglesey

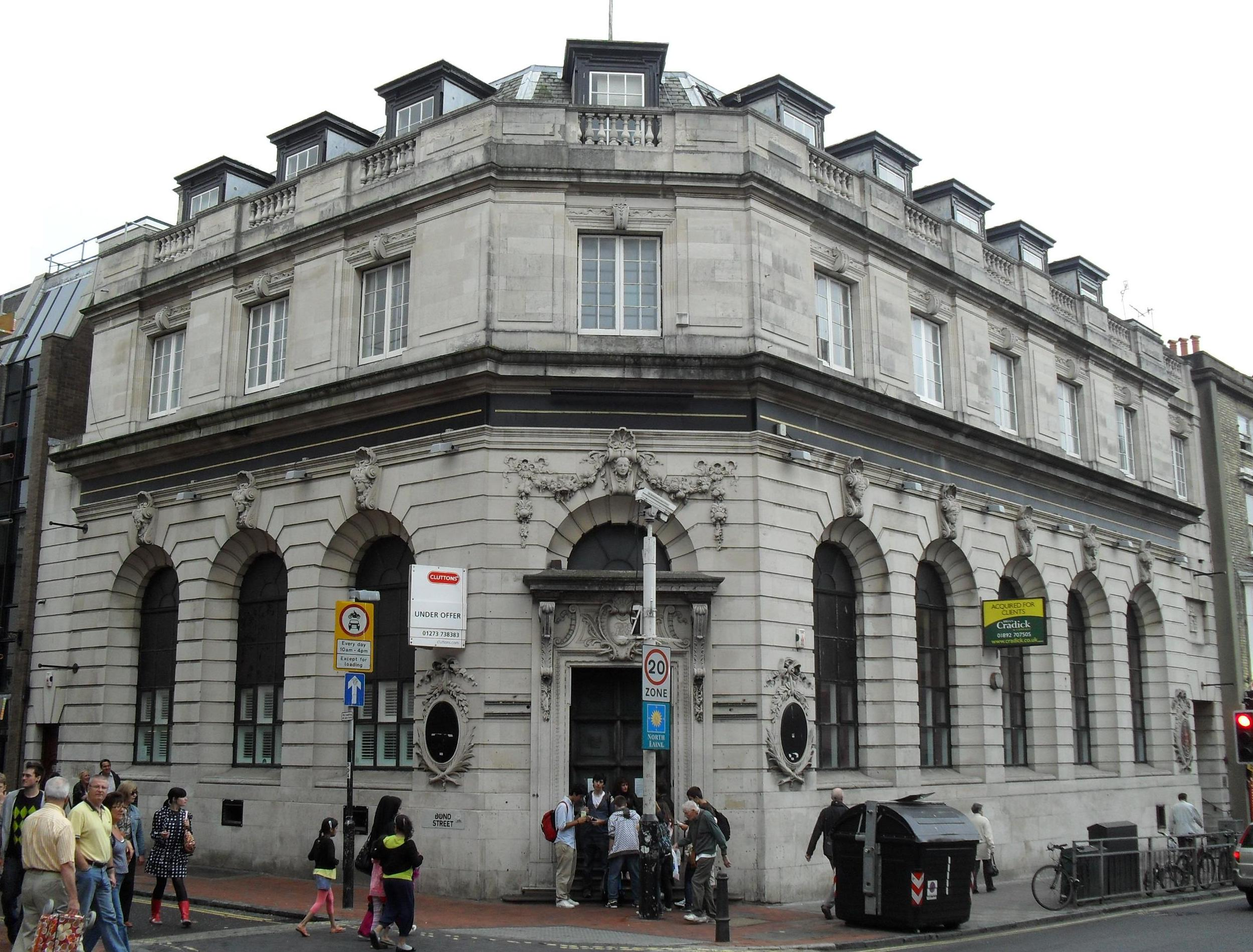
155–158 North Street, Brighton, branch building designed by the in-house architect F. C. R. Palmer

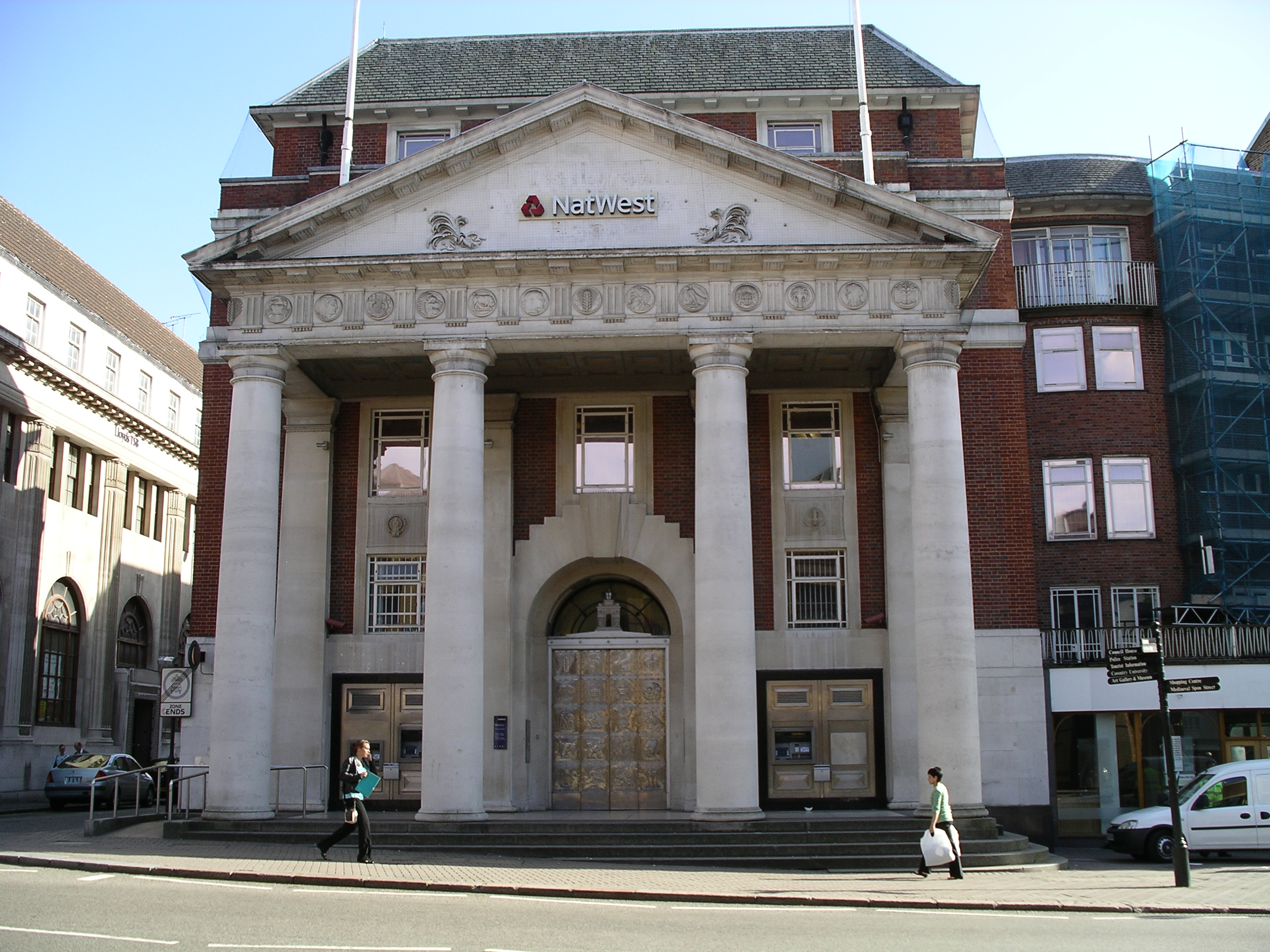
Coventry branch designed by Palmer in 1929

Prior to the Country Bankers Act 1826 (7 Geo. 4. c. 46), English banks were permitted to have no more than six partners – hence the expression "private banks". The only banks allowed to be joint stock were the Bank of England and the Scottish banks, which operated under a different legal system. The leading campaigner for change was Thomas Joplin, a Newcastle timber merchant "with local experience of banking disasters" and an observer of the greater stability of the nearby Scottish banks. The Country Bankers Act 1826 permitted the establishment of joint stock banks but note issue was only allowed outside a radius of 65 miles of London. The 1826 act was followed by the creation of new provincial joint stock banks and conversions from existing private banks. Because of the prohibition on note issue in the London area, it was incorrectly assumed that the act also prohibited joint stock banks themselves, an ambiguity that was removed by the Bank Charter Act 1833.

When Thomas Joplin discovered that the laws preventing the establishment of joint stock banks in Ireland had been repealed in 1824, he promoted the Irish Provincial Banking Company, to be based in London but with branches in all the principal towns in Ireland outside Dublin; this was to be a forerunner of Joplin's English version. Joplin left the management of the Irish Bank in 1828. Financial support from his cousin George Angas was promised in 1829 and a company was formed in 1830. The first meeting resolved to establish a "system of banking …under the review of a central board in London [and] applied to the direction of country banking". There were numerous delays but the National Provincial Bank of England was eventually launched in 1833.

The National Provincial Bank thus was established as a provincial bank but with a London head office. Moreover, it was specifically structured to be a branch banking enterprise prepared to concentrate on a large number of smaller accounts rather than a small number of large accounts. For more than thirty years the bank operated as a country bank, with its headquarters in London, but not transacting banking business in the capital.

The first branch to be opened, at the beginning of 1834, was in Gloucester followed by Brecon, Walsall, Birmingham, Wotton-under-Edge, Boston and Wisbech. By 1836 there were 32 branches. Considerable dissension soon arose relating to the structure of the branch system and Joplin, who favoured a network of local semi-autonomous banks, left. The model for the branch system had been the Scottish one, and the bank reinforced this by recruiting Daniel Robertson from the Union Bank of Scotland; he served as general manager for thirty years.

Many of the branches that were "opened" during the 19th century came from the acquisition of local banks, sometimes as a going concern, sometimes merely taking over the premises after a failure. Sources vary as to the number of acquisitions, their common trading name and even the exact year of purchase. However, although they may have been strategic in their own locality, none of the acquisitions appeared to be large. It was not until 1866 that the bank opened for banking business in London by which time it had a nationwide network of 122 branches. The bank ceased its provincial note issue and was appointed to the London Bankers' Clearing House. By 1886 the National Provincial Bank had 165 branches and its network was second only to the London and County Bank. There was now little in the way of acquisition but the branch network continued to increase – according to the NatWest Heritage Hub, there were 200 branches by 1900 and over 450 by the time of the 1918 merger (however, the scale of the post-1900 increase is surprisingly large and the latter figure may include sub-branches).

=== Union Bank of London ===
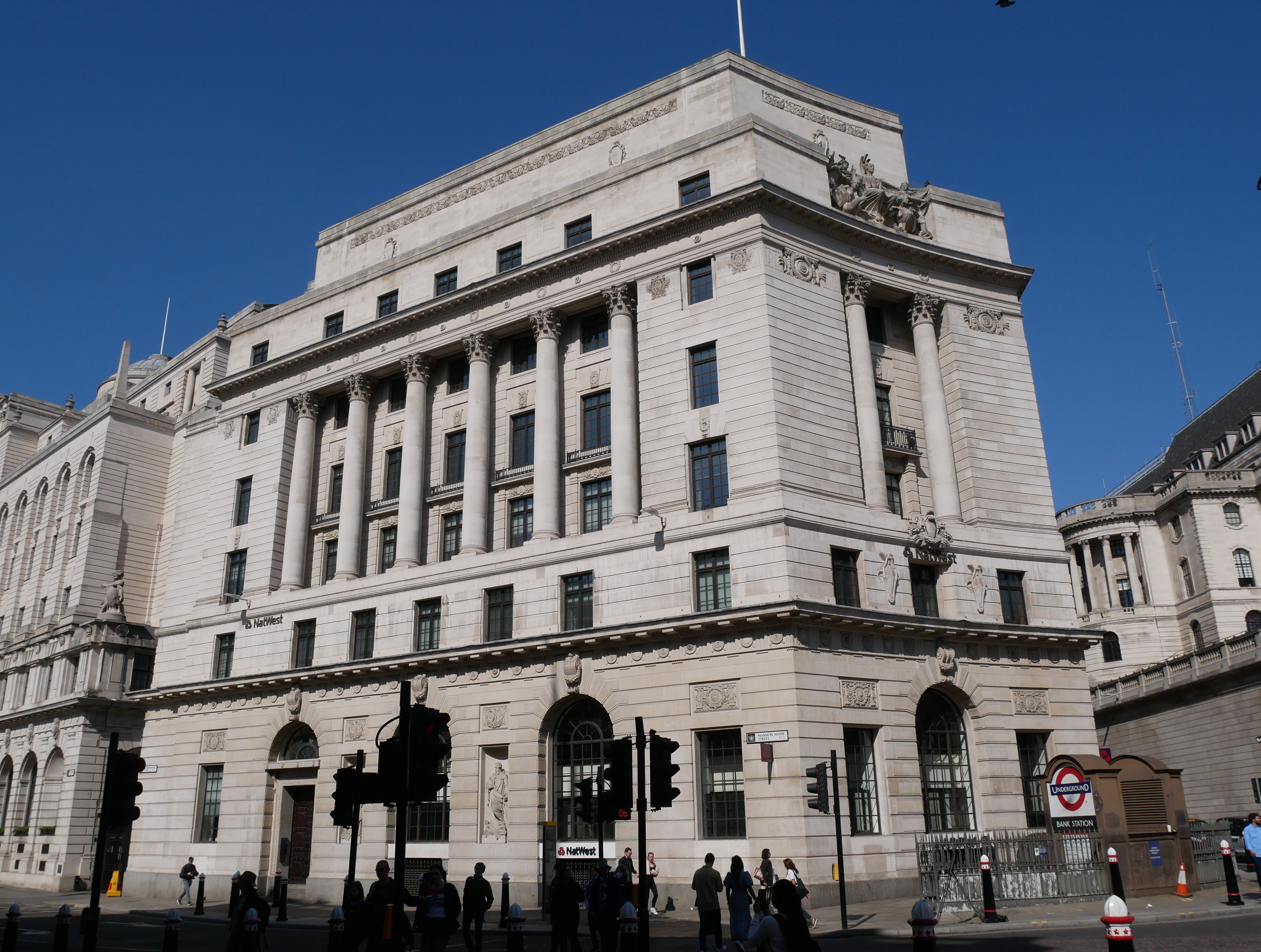
National Provincial Bank branch building on Princes Street, erected in 1929–1932 on the location of the former head office of the Union Bank of London

The Union Bank of London was formed in 1839 and it remained a purely metropolitan bank for the rest of the century; it was of no great size during that period, opening around a dozen branches in central London and acquiring the occasional small local bank. Although it refused to open branches in the provinces, it did develop an extensive overseas business. Policy changed at the turn of the century and the Union embarked on a major expansion acquiring in particular the private Cripplegate Bank in 1900, Smith's Bank in 1902, and Prescott's Bank in 1903, thereby forming the Union of London and Smith's Bank. Prescott's Bank had been founded in Threadneedle Street in 1766 and went through several name changes over the years as partners changed. However, in 1891 a multiple merger radically changed the scope of the Bank. Prescott's acquired Dimsdale, another long-established London private bank; Miles, Cave, Baillie of Bristol (established 1750); and Tugwell Brymer of Bath; the enlarged firm was called Prescott, Dimsdale, Cave, Tugwell & Co. Several more small country banks were later acquired and the Bank's name was shortened to Prescott & Co. in 1903, shortly before its acquisition by the Union Bank. The National Provincial Bank eventually acquired the Union of London and Smith's Bank in 1918. The enlarged bank was renamed the National Provincial and Union Bank of England.

From 1844 on, the Union Bank was located at Princes Street on Bank Junction, across from the Bank of England. On that site the bank erected a prominent new head office building, designed by Philip Charles Hardwick and completed in 1865, remodeled in 1887. That building was in turn replaced by the branch building of National Provincial Bank on the same location, designed by Edwin Cooper and completed in 1932.

=== Interwar period and later developments ===
Further acquisitions followed the 1918 merger, in particular the prestigious London-based Coutts Bank in 1920. Significant regional banks included Bradford District Bank (1919), Sheffield Banking Company (1919) and Northamptonshire Union Bank (1920). In 1924 the small Guernsey Banking Co. was to be the Bank's last domestic acquisition until 1961 and National Provincial's progress came from continued branch opening, particularly around the London area.

National Provincial did have a small overseas operation in the form of a 50 per cent share of Lloyds and National Provincial Foreign Bank in Paris, which it had acquired in 1917 and part-sold to Lloyds Bank in 1955. However, its more substantive overseas move came in 1924 with the acquisition of Grindlays Bank, a London-based institution with offices in India and specialising in serving the Indian army. Grindlays had been affected by the failure of competing banks and sought a larger partner. Grindlays was allowed to operate independently and was sold to the London-based National Bank of India in 1948.

In 1961 National Provincial acquired the Isle of Man Bank but the major acquisition came in 1962 when the District Bank was bought, creating a company with over £1.4 billion in assets and 2,100 branches. The District, being the one-time Manchester and Liverpool District Banking Company, gave the National Provincial valuable exposure to the north west. It maintained a separate board in Manchester until the merger with Westminster Bank.

=== Merger and legacy ===
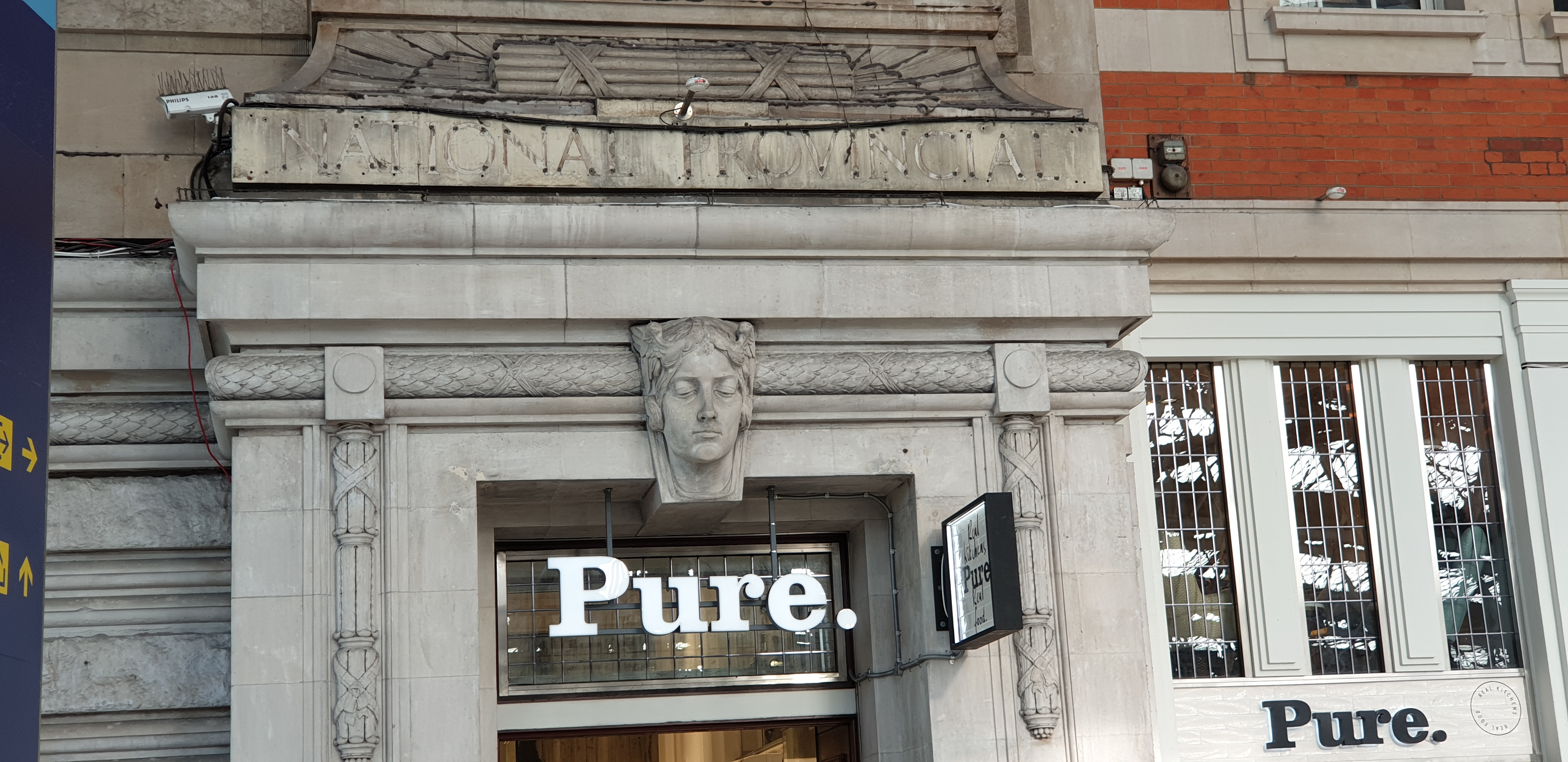
Former branch at London Waterloo station, with outline of the National Provincial lettering still visible

The merger of National Provincial and Westminster Bank, announced in 1968, surprised the British public and banking community "as it was still widely assumed...that any merger among the 'Big Five' would not be permitted." Nevertheless, the financial authorities did permit the merger and a new company, National Westminster Bank, was formed to acquire the share capital of the two constituent banks. The statutory process of integration was completed in 1969 and the new company opened for business on 1 January 1970. The enlarged entity now had a network of 3,600 branches.

The National Provincial Bank, District Bank, and Westminster Bank were fully integrated in the new firm's structure, while Coutts, Ulster Bank (a 1917 Westminster acquisition), and the Isle of Man Bank continued as separate operations. Duncan Stirling, chairman of Westminster Bank, became first chairman and each bank provided a joint chief executive. In 1969, David Robarts, former chairman of National Provincial, assumed Stirling's position.

Following the merger, the National Provincial Bank continued to exist as a dormant non-trading company until 2016, when it was voluntarily struck off the register and dissolved.

=== Table of acquisitions ===
Date	Acquisition	Established
1834	Rotton & Co., Birmingham	1806
1835	Bloxsome & Player, Durham	1813
1835	Bristol City Bank	Branch of Northern & Central Bank
1836	Vye & Harris, Ilfracombe	1807
1836	William Skinner & Co., Stockton	1815
1836	Pyke, Law & Co., Barnstaple	1807
1838	Lichfield, Rugeley & Tamworth Banking Co.	1836
1839	Husband & Co., Devonport	1810
1840	Fryer, Andrews & Co., Wimborne	c.1790
1840	Harris & Co., Dartmouth	1806
1840	Hulke & Son, Deal	1808
1841	Minet & Fector, Dover	1700
1842	Cole, Holroyd & Co., Exeter	1822
1843	Peter Pew & Co., Sherbourne	c.1750
1843	Loveband & Co., Torrington	1808
1843	Ley & Co., Bideford	c.1790
1844	Isle of Wight Joint-Stock Bank, Newport, Isle of Wight	1842
1855	Thomas Kinnersly & Sons, Newcastle-under-Lyme	c.1780
1846	Stockton & Durham County Bank, Stockton	1838
1858	William Moore, Stone	1800
1868	Crawshay, Bailey & Co., Abergavenny	1837
1868	Bailey & Co., Newport	1837
1871	David Morris & Sons, Carmarthen	c.1790
1878	Bank of Leeds	1864
1891	Miles, Cave, Baillie & Co	1750
1899	County of Stafford Bank	1836
1903	Knaresborough & Claro Banking Co.	1831
1918	William & John Biggerstaffe, London	c.1830s
1919	Sheffield Banking Co.	1831
1919	Bradford District Bank	1862
1920	Northamptonshire Union Bank	1836
1920	Richards & Co., Llangollen	1854
1920	Shilson, Coode & Co., St Austell	1793
1922	Dingley & Co., Launceston	1855
1922	Dingley, Pearse & Co., Okehampton	1856
1924	Guernsey Banking Co. Ltd.	1847

== Branding ==
The bishop's gate device on the bank's emblem was part of a pictorial representation of the bank's address at 15 Bishopsgate in the City of London. It is surmounted by two squirrels (suggested by the College of Arms as denoting thrift and foresight) supporting an urn; this alludes to The Flower Pot Inn which originally stood on the site of the entrance to the city office.

== Tournier v National Provincial and Union Bank of England ==
In 1924 the bank was involved in a notable court case. In England and those common law jurisdictions whose approach follows that of English law in treating the duty of confidentiality as resting in contract, the classic authority is the Court of Appeal decision in Tournier v National Provincial and Union Bank of England. The duty extends at least to information concerning account transactions and extends beyond the date of the termination of the banker-customer contract. Information attained from other sources, such as a credit reference agency, is also covered. The duty is not absolute for the bank may disclose information where the disclosure is under compulsion by law, where there is a duty to the public to disclose, where the interests of the bank require disclosure and where the disclosure is made by the express or implied consent of the customer.

== See also ==
- Big Four (banking)

== Bibliography ==
- Ashby, J. F. The Story of the Banks Hutchinson & Co., London, 1934
- Withers, Hartley National Provincial Bank 1833–1933 Waterlow & Sons, London, 1933
- Reed, Richard National Westminster Bank: A Short History National Westminster Bank, London, 1983 (and many subsequent editions).
