= Charles Henry Mabey =

English sculptor

- Born: 9 September 1835; Pimlico, London, England
- Died: 17 February 1912 (aged 76); Streatham, London, England
- Resting place: Norwood Cemetery
- Known for: Sculpture and medals

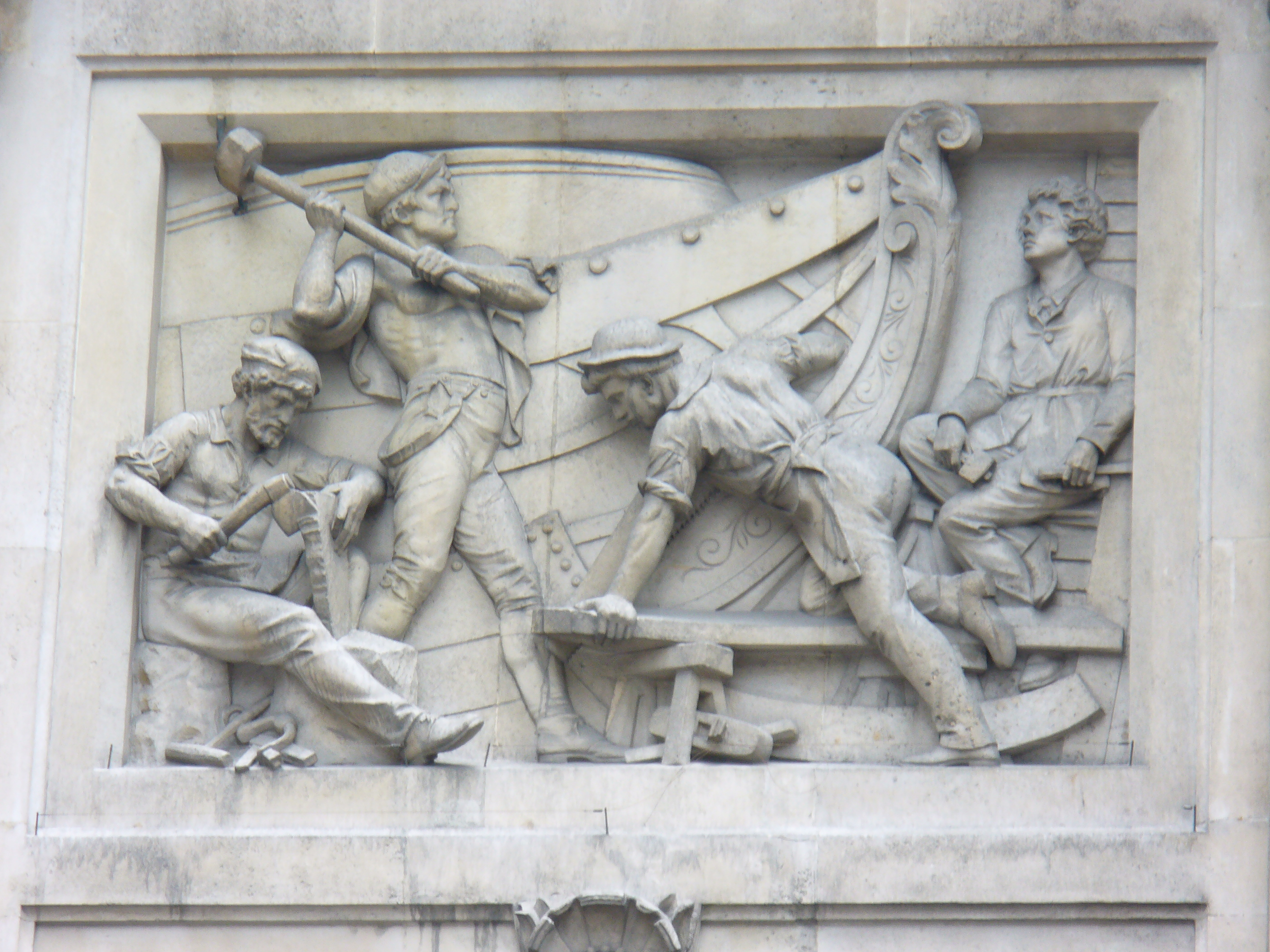
Shipbuilding, a relief by Mabey at Gibson Hall in Bishopsgate, London

Charles Henry Mabey (9 September 1835 – 17 February 1912) was an English sculptor and medallist.

== Biography ==
Charles Henry Mabey was born in Pimlico, London, in 1835, to James Mabey (1812–1883), also a sculptor. His training is unknown. Many of his commissions involved architectural sculpture and reliefs. Mabey exhibited at the Royal Academy from 1863, mostly exhibiting busts and medals.

Mabey traded under C. H. and J. Mabey, with both his father and his son, Charles Henry Mabey Junior, who trained under him. He died in Streatham in 1912.

== Works ==
Mabey worked with the architect John Gibson, including on Gibson Hall in Bishopsgate, London, for which he sculpted the reliefs. Mabey also produced reliefs for the Temple Bar Memorial by Horace Jones. Mabey was the modeller for the dolphin lamp standards on the Victoria Embankment, as well as the sphinxes at Cleopatra's Needle.

Mabey was the sculptor of the Boy statue in St James's Park, London. At the time he was working under Robert Jackson.
