= Carmarthen Library =

Building in Carmarthen built in 1761

Coordinates: 51.8582°N 4.3035°W

- Llyfrgell Caerfyrddin
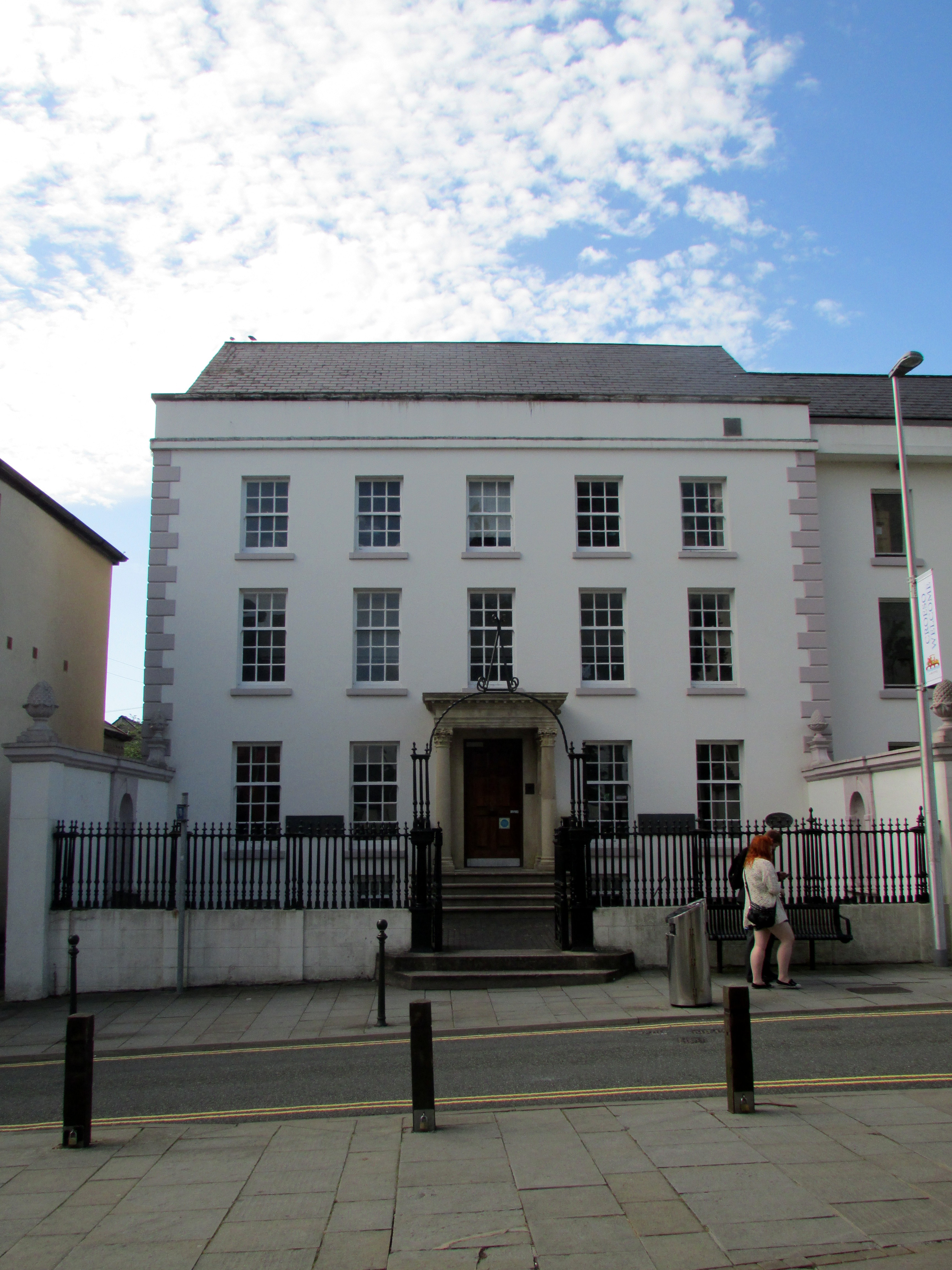
- Alternative names: Furnace House

General information
- Location: St Peters Street, Carmarthen, Carmarthenshire, SA31 1LN
- Year built: 1761
- Renovated: 1972–73

Listed Building – Grade II
- Official name: Furnace House including forecourt walls, railings, gates and overthrow
- Designated: 18 August 1954
- Reference no.: 9589

Carmarthen Library (also known as Furnace House; Welsh: Llyfrgell Caerfyrddin) is a Grade II listed building in Carmarthen, Wales built in 1761. It currently houses the public library in Carmarthen.

== History ==
The building was built in 1761 as a town house for Robert Morgan, a local ironmaster. The building's forecourt is surrounded by railings, which also date from 1761 and may have been made at the tin mill that Morgan established in that same year.

After his death, the building was occupied by at least one of his sons, John.

In 1819, Charles Morgan rented out the large garden at the rear to a gardener. The location of the garden is now covered by the archive buildings and St. Peter's Street Car Park.

The Morgan family sold the building in 1878 to Mr. S. E. Richards, and it was occupied by Mrs. Richards in 1890.

In 1883, the town council began using the property as lodgings for the judges of assize, which continued for many years. There were 3 assizes per year in Carmarthen, with the owners vacating the property for each judicial visit. Mr. Justice Charles stayed at Furnace House in 1892.

Mr. David Thomas, an auctioneer and estate agent, died of pneumonia at Furnace House, which was his residence, in March 1894, aged 38. His wife had died two years previously after a long illness. His father, Nathanial Thomas, a farmer, lived at Furnace House until his death at home aged 75 in 1901.

In 1901, Furnace House was listed for sale at auction for the price of £1,150. In that year, Carmarthenshire County Council considered purchasing the property as judges' lodgings, having been paying the owner of Furnace House £82 per year for its use as judges' lodgings, but instead bought Old Bank House on Spilman Street. However, the building continued to be used by judges as, in 1926, it was occupied by David Harris, MB, JP.

The building was later used by YWCA.

== Library ==
In 1972–73, the building was reconstructed as a public library, keeping only the façade and forecourt of the original building. Prior to the restoration work, the building was near demolition.

A large extension was built to the rear of the building in 2018–2022 to house the National Broadcast Library and the Carmarthenshire Archives. The new building was built to Passivhaus standards and opened to the public on 13 July 2022.
