= Druid: Boudicca's Rebellion, 61 A.D. =

Board wargame

Druid
- Designers: Richard Berg
- Illustrators: Larry Catalano; Melanie Gottlieb; Ray Sternbergh
- Publishers: West End Games
- Publication: 1984
- Genres: Roman

Druid: Boudicca's Rebellion, 61 A.D. is board wargame published by West End Games (WEG) in 1984 that simulates the rebellion of Britons led by Boudica against Roman invaders.

== Background ==
In the late 50s BCE, some years after Roman forces had begun to conquer Britain, Prasutagus, king of the Iceni in what is now Norfolk, attempted secure his kingdom's independence by leaving his lands jointly to his daughters and the Roman emperor in his will. However, when he died, his will was ignored. The Roman historian Tacitus described the Romans as seizing lands, enslaving Iceni, and violently humiliating the royal family: the widow of Prasutagus, Boudica, was publicly flogged and his daughters were raped. Boudica subsequently led a violent uprising of Britons against both the Roman invaders as well as any Britons who were collaborators of the Romans.

== Description ==
Druid: Boudicca's Rebellion, 61 A.D. is a two-player operational wargame where one player controls Roman forces, and the other player controls Boudica's forces.

=== Components ===
The game box holds a 22" x 34" hex grid map of Roman Britain scaled at 8 kilometres (5.0 mi) per hex, and 250 counters.

=== Set up ===
At the start of the game, the British player has 4 rebellious tribes representing 148 combat points and three leaders — two druids plus Boudica — all located roughly in the east of the map. The Roman side has 2 legions, part of a third, and around thirty auxiliary units, plus five civilian tokens, representing 160 combat points.

=== Gameplay ===
Each turn follows this sequence:

1. "Command": Each player randomly draws a numerical marker which, when added to the Operation Rating of the main leader on the map, determines their scope for action in terms of Operation Points (OPs).
2. "Logistics": The Roman player checks the supply status of their legions.
3. "Civilian Movement": The Roman player moves the counters representing the populations of several major cities.
4. "Mystic" Phase: The British player, using their "Druid" counters, can invoke the Gods.
5. "Operations": Each player has a limited number of OPs. First the British player may spend OPs to move units, destroy a Roman outpost or village, massacre civilians, or engage in combat with Roman or auxiliary troops. The player may spend all their OPs immediately, or halt their actions and pass the turn to the Roman player, who in turn may likewise spend OPs to move and attack. The Roman player can also pass before spending all their OPs, in which case the British player, if they have any OPs left, can continue on. The turn passes back and forth until neither player has OPs left, bringing the turn to a close. One turn represents 2 days of game time.
6. "Revolt": The British player attempts to draw neutral tribes into the revolt.

=== Strategy ===
As critic Peter Cebokli points out, the player controlling the Britons has the option of following history and attacking the Romans directly, hoping for a quick victory before the Roman forces can get organized; or the British player can take what Cebokli describes as the "Vietnam option", fading into the forest and fighting the Romans with guerrilla warfare.

== Publication history ==
From 1977 to 1984, WEG was primarily a wargame publisher, well-known for producing games with professional game components.Just prior to turning their attention to role-playing games (Paranoia and Ghostbusters), WEG published Druid: Boudicca's Rebellion, 61 A.D., a wargame designed by Richard Berg, with artwork by Larry Catalano, Melanie Gottlieb, and Ray Sternbergh.

In 2012, Berg created a revised and updated version of the game titled Boudicca: The Warrior Queen, which appeared in Issue 35 of Against All Odds. At the 2012 Charles S. Roberts Awards, this version was a finalist in the category "Best Magazine Game."

== Reception ==
In Issue 21 of the Australian game magazine Breakout!, Peter Cebokli called the components "attractive; not as good as a Victory Game, but definitely above average." Cebokli noted that historically, "the campaign was not too interesting ... before [the Britons] achieved any lasting military victory, the main Roman army appeared and squashed the poor old Brits. Not exactly ebb and tide stuff." However, Cebokli was not a fan of the guerrilla warfare option, saying that it had "one major disadvantage: it can quickly become boring. I prefer the quick attack in the vain hope I can defeat the Roman army and win the game. At least the game finishes quickly." Cebokli concluded, "Not much to base a game on; still a good prawn and beer game and most importantly, not over complex".

In Issue 33 of the French games magazine Casus Belli, Yves Jourdain noted, "Druid is more than just a wargame; it is a game in the truest sense, as luck and chance play a major role — but it is an excellent game, and truly enjoyable." Jourdain concluded, "Above all, it lets us give free rein to our basest instincts, since we spend our time razing villages in a competitive frenzy or chasing down civilians—all with a clear conscience. So, go ahead and let off some steam!"

Games included Druid in their "Top 100 Games of 1984", saying, "In the clever game system, neither player knows for sure how many moves the other is allowed to make each turn. An amusing 'Druid Invocation Table' results in random events from bad weather to a curse falling on the Roman leader."

== Other reviews and commentary ==
- Battleplan #8
