= AD 61 =

AD 61 in various calendars
- Gregorian calendar: AD 61; LXI
- Ab urbe condita: 814
- Assyrian calendar: 4811
- Balinese saka calendar: N/A
- Bengali calendar: −533 – −532
- Berber calendar: 1011
- Buddhist calendar: 605
- Burmese calendar: −577
- Byzantine calendar: 5569–5570
- Chinese calendar: 庚申年 (Metal Monkey); 2758 or 2551 — to — 辛酉年 (Metal Rooster); 2759 or 2552
- Coptic calendar: −223 – −222
- Discordian calendar: 1227
- Ethiopian calendar: 53–54
- Hebrew calendar: 3821–3822
- Hindu calendars
- Vikram Samvat: 117–118
- Shaka Samvat: N/A
- Kali Yuga: 3161–3162
- Holocene calendar: 10061
- Iranian calendar: 561 BP – 560 BP
- Islamic calendar: 578 BH – 577 BH
- Javanese calendar: N/A
- Julian calendar: AD 61; LXI
- Korean calendar: 2394
- Minguo calendar: 1851 before ROC 民前1851年
- Nanakshahi calendar: −1407
- Seleucid era: 372/373 AG
- Thai solar calendar: 603–604
- Tibetan calendar: ལྕགས་ཕོ་སྤྲེ་ལོ་ (male Iron-Monkey); 187 or −194 or −966 — to — ལྕགས་མོ་བྱ་ལོ་ (female Iron-Bird); 188 or −193 or −965

AD 61 (LXI) was a common year starting on Thursday of the Julian calendar. At the time, it was known as the Year of the Consulship of Turpilianus and Caesennius (or, less frequently, year 814 Ab urbe condita). The denomination AD 61 for this year has been used since the early medieval period, when the Anno Domini calendar era became the prevalent method in Europe for naming years.

== Events ==
=== By place ===
==== Roman Empire ====
- Publius Petronius Turpilianus and Lucius Caesennius Paetus become Roman consuls.
- Galba becomes governor of Hispania Tarraconensis.
- The following events in Roman Britain (Britannia) take place in AD 60 or 61:
  - Gaius Suetonius Paulinus, Roman governor of Britain, captures the island of Mona (Anglesey), the last stronghold of the Druids.
  - Prasutagus, king of the Iceni (modern East Anglia), dies leaving a will which passes his kingdom to his two daughters and the Roman Empire. The Roman army however annexes the kingdom as if conquered, depriving the nobles of their hereditary lands and plundering the land. The king's widow, Boudica, is flogged and forced to watch their daughters publicly raped. Roman financiers, including Seneca the Younger, call in their loans.
  - Boudica leads a rebellion of the Iceni against Roman rule in alliance with the Trinovantes, Cornovii, Durotriges and Celtic Britons. The Iceni and Trinovantes first destroy the Roman capital Camulodunum (Colchester), wipe out the infantry of the Legio IX Hispana (commanded by Quintus Petillius Cerialis) and go on to burn Londinium (London) (probably destroying London Bridge) and Verulamium (St Albans), in all cases massacring the inhabitants in their thousands.
  - Battle of Watling Street: Paulinus defeats the rebels, using a flying wedge formation, and imposes wide-ranging punishments on native Britons, but is removed from office after an enquiry instituted by Gaius Julius Alpinus Classicianus (appointed procurator 61) and the Romanisation of Britain continues. Boudica either poisons herself or falls sick and dies.

== Births ==
- Pliny the Younger, Roman author and statesman (d. c. 113)

== Deaths ==
- Barnabas, Cypriot Jew and bishop of Milan (approximate date)
- Boudica, British queen of the Iceni tribe (approximate date)
- Lucius Pedanius Secundus, Roman politician and prefect
- Ma Wu, Chinese general of the Eastern Han Dynasty
- Publius Memmius Regulus, Roman politician
