= Boudica (2023 film) =

British action drama film

- Directed by: Jesse V. Johnson
- Screenplay by: Jesse V. Johnson
- Based on: Boudica and the Celtic Britonnnic revolt of AD 60–61
- Produced by: Ehud Bleiberg; Lucinda Rhodes Thakrar; Mark Vennis
- Starring: Olga Kurylenko
- Cinematography: Jonathan Hall
- Edited by: Matthew Lorentz
- Music by: Sean Murray
- Production companies: Bleiberg Entertainment; Boudeg; Picture Perfect
- Distributed by: Saban Films; Signature Entertainment
- Release dates: October 27, 2023 (United States); October 30, 2023 (United Kingdom)
- Running time: 101 minutes
- Country: United Kingdom
- Languages: English; Iceni Brythonic; Latin
- Box office: $53,036 (USD)

Boudica (or sometimes Boudica: Queen of War), is a 2023 British action drama film directed and written by Jesse V. Johnson. The film follows the eponymous Celtic warrior of the Iceni people, Boudica, in Roman Britain and how she revolted against the Romans after the death of her husband, Prasutagus. The film stars Olga Kurylenko as the titular character. The film received mixed reviews.

== Synopsis ==
Boudica is the wife of Prasutagus, king of the Iceni, in the aftermath of the Roman conquest of Britain. Although there is an old legend of the Trinovantes about a woman warrior who will lead them to victory, they embrace Roman culture and raise their daughters to speak Latin. While visiting the market, Boudica's servant makes a disparaging comment about the emperor Nero which leads to a confrontation with the Roman merchant. Boudica is rescued by a woman of the Trinovantes. Prasutagus smooths over the situation with the Romans.

The Roman procurator Catus Decianus visits Prasutagus and, despite their hospitality, appears displeased. Prasutagus intends to make him a gift to win him over, but is soon killed by brigands. His guardsman Ciaran brings the news to a devastated Boudica. She becomes queen and gifts half her kingdom to the Romans. Catus arrives during her inauguration, however, and claims that a woman cannot be queen in the Roman empire. He dismisses Boudica's gift as an attempted bribe, declares the kingdom confiscated, and has her and her daughters flogged. He also reveals that Ciaran betrayed Prasutagus to Catus's men, before branding Boudica on the face.

Boudica and her daughters are rescued from captivity by the Trinovantes, who recognise her as their queen. She is initially challenged by Wolfgar, a deserter from the Roman auxiliaries, but wins him and his men over after apparently performing a miracle with a bronze sword given to her by Prasutagus. She plans an ambush against Catus in Folbrook Forest, over Wolfgar's objections that the Romans are too strong for such an attack to work. She once again sways the warriors by performing a magic trick with her sword.

During the ambush, both Catus and Ciaran, now working for the Romans, are killed and the Romans are slaughtered. Boudica insists that the war must continue until the Romans are driven out, which will require permission from the druidic council. Wolfgar persuades the druids to support her, then propositions her, which she rejects. The druids bless Boudica but reveal that her daughters are dead and she is accompanied by their ghosts. She continues to take advice from them. Inspired by them, she sacks and burns the town of Camulos, ambushes another Roman column in a forest near Cambridge, and then destroys London.

In Rome, Nero kills himself in despair at the Great Fire of Rome and the situation in Britain. Gaius Suetonius Paulinus prepares to lead a relief army. Wolfgar recommends to Boudica that they retreat, as Paulinus's men are veterans, and the winter is coming, which is a poor time for the Britons to fight, but she insists on fighting. Her daughters recommend that she sleep with him to regain his loyalty, but she allows him to leave.

At the battle of Watling Street, Paulinus leads Boudica's army into a trap and massacres the Britons with archers and artillery. Boudica asks her daughters for help, but they advise that the time for fighting is over and it is time for her to join them. Despite Wolfgar's sudden arrival to support her, Boudica's last desperate charge is defeated and she and her followers are killed.

The film closes with shots of the statue of Boudica on Westminster Bridge in London.

== Cast ==
- Olga Kurylenko as Boudica
- Peter Franzén as Wolfgar
- Clive Standen as Prasutagus
- Lucy Martin as Cartimanda
- Nick Moran as Catus Decianus
- James Faulkner as Old Druid
- Rita Tushingham as Green Druid
- Harry Kirton as Emperor Nero
- Andy Beckwith as Store-Handler
- Dominique Vandenberg as Wolfgar's Bodyguard
- Jon Wennington as Trinovante Warrior
- Leo Gregory as Ciaran
- Kris Johnson as Gaius Suetonius Paulinus
- James G. Nunn as Tamesas
- Justin Sysum as Quintus Petillius Cerialis

== Production ==
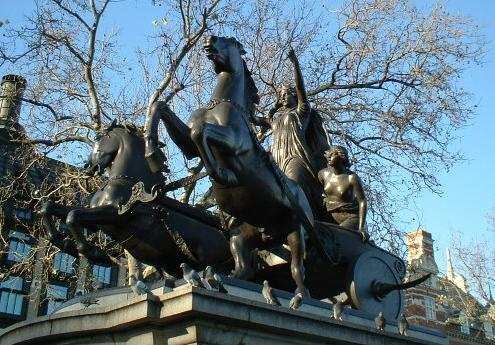
The statue of Boudica near Westminster Pier, London, was used in the final scenes of the film

Filming took place in various locations across the United Kingdom. Film crew were spotted filming in St Lawrence's Church in Ipswich. The roundhouse was filmed in Hadleigh. The Boudica statue by Thomas Thornycroft near Westminster Pier, London, was used for the film's closing scenes in modern-day London.

== Release ==
The film was released on Amazon Prime Video on 30 October 2023.

Boudica was made available on Netflix in the United Kingdom. It was listed without the subtitle 'Queen of War'.

== Historical Accuracy ==
Much of the Latin spoken throughout the film is ungrammatical, for instance using the plural in place of the singular. The city of Camulodunum (now Colchester) is referred to as Camulos, which is neither its Roman nor Brittonic name (Camulodunum and Camulodunon respectively). The Great Fire of Rome occurred some years after Boudicca's rebellion, in AD 64. Nero survived as Emperor until AD 68. Paulinus was present in Britain throughout the revolt rather than waiting in Rome until after the sack of London.

While the Romans did use archers in battle, they were auxiliaries rather than legionaries, so did not wear the lorica segmentata as shown in the final battle. Catus Decianus survived the uprising and fled to Gaul.

In the film, Boudica's charioteer and bodyguard is called Cartimanda, a clear reference to Cartimandua, who was a Brittonic queen contemporary with Boudica, but was friendly to Rome and did not join the uprising. Roman sources do not report Boudica's death at Watling Street. Those who mention her death say she died some time after the battle, perhaps by suicide.

== Reception ==
=== Critical response ===
Review aggregation website Rotten Tomatoes gives Boudica: The Queen of War a 40% rating based on 15 reviews and an average of 4.4. One review by Bilge Ebiri of New York said, "It’s like a dimestore Braveheart: It might not have the sweep of those old-school period action films, but it’s still thrilling and passionate and filled with bloodcurdling, wall-to-wall violence."

== See also ==
- Boudica
- Boudican revolt
