= AD 60 =

AD 60 in various calendars
- Gregorian calendar: AD 60; LX
- Ab urbe condita: 813
- Assyrian calendar: 4810
- Balinese saka calendar: N/A
- Bengali calendar: −534 – −533
- Berber calendar: 1010
- Buddhist calendar: 604
- Burmese calendar: −578
- Byzantine calendar: 5568–5569
- Chinese calendar: 己未年 (Earth Goat); 2757 or 2550 — to — 庚申年 (Metal Monkey); 2758 or 2551
- Coptic calendar: −224 – −223
- Discordian calendar: 1226
- Ethiopian calendar: 52–53
- Hebrew calendar: 3820–3821
- Hindu calendars
- Vikram Samvat: 116–117
- Shaka Samvat: N/A
- Kali Yuga: 3160–3161
- Holocene calendar: 10060
- Iranian calendar: 562 BP – 561 BP
- Islamic calendar: 579 BH – 578 BH
- Javanese calendar: N/A
- Julian calendar: AD 60; LX
- Korean calendar: 2393
- Minguo calendar: 1852 before ROC 民前1852年
- Nanakshahi calendar: −1408
- Seleucid era: 371/372 AG
- Thai solar calendar: 602–603
- Tibetan calendar: ས་མོ་ལུག་ལོ་ (female Earth-Sheep); 186 or −195 or −967 — to — ལྕགས་ཕོ་སྤྲེ་ལོ་ (male Iron-Monkey); 187 or −194 or −966

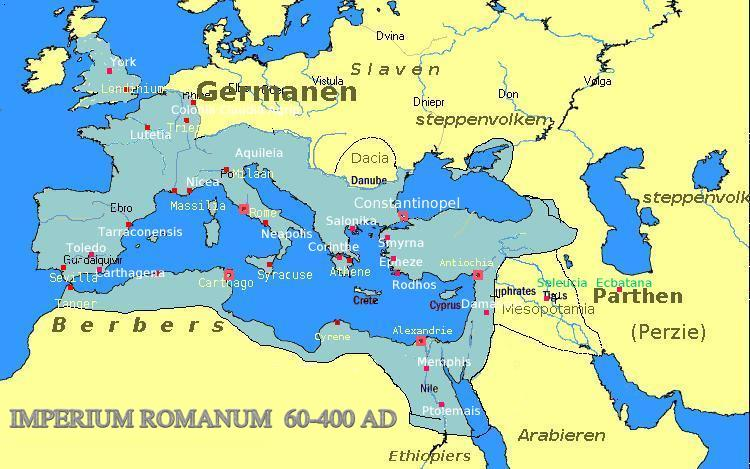
The Roman Empire in 60

AD 60 (LX) was a leap year starting on Tuesday of the Julian calendar. At the time, it was known as the Year of the Consulship of Nero and Lentulus (or, less frequently, year 813 Ab urbe condita). The denomination AD 60 for this year has been used since the early medieval period, when the Anno Domini calendar era became the prevalent method in Europe for naming years.

The year 60 is the first identifiable year for which a date is cited complete with day of the week, i.e. 6 February 60, identified as a "Sunday" (as viii idus Februarius dies solis "eighth day before the ides of February, day of the Sun") in a Pompeiian graffito. According to the currently-used Julian calendar, 6 February 60 was a Wednesday (dies Mercurii, "day of Mercury"). This is explained by the existence of two conventions of naming days of the weeks based on the planetary hours system, February 6 was a "Sunday" based on the sunset naming convention, and a "Wednesday" based on the sunrise naming convention.

== Events ==
=== By place ===
==== Roman Empire ====
- The Roxolani are defeated on the Danube by the Romans.
- Nero's exploration of the Nile: Emperor Nero sends an expedition which reaches the historical city Meroë (Sudan). (approximate date)
- Vitellius is (possibly) proconsul of the province of Africa.
- Agrippa II of the Herodians rules the northeast of Judea.
- The city of Laodicea on the Lycus is destroyed by an earthquake
- The following events in Roman Britain (Britannia) take place in AD 60 or 61:
  - Gaius Suetonius Paulinus, Roman governor of Britain, captures the island of Mona (Anglesey), the last stronghold of the Druids.
  - Prasutagus, king of the Iceni (modern East Anglia), dies leaving a will which passes his kingdom to his two daughters and the Roman Empire. The Roman army, however, annexes the kingdom as if conquered, depriving the nobles of their hereditary lands and plundering the land. The king's widow, Boudica, is flogged and forced to watch their daughters publicly raped. Roman financiers, including Seneca the Younger, call in their loans.
  - Boudica leads a rebellion of the Iceni against Roman rule in alliance with the Trinovantes, Cornovii, Durotriges and Celtic Britons. The Iceni and Trinovantes first destroy the Roman capital Camulodunum (Colchester), wipe out the infantry of the Legio IX Hispana (commanded by Quintus Petillius Cerialis) and go on to burn Londinium (London) (probably destroying London Bridge) and Verulamium (St Albans), in all cases massacring the inhabitants by the thousands.
  - Battle of Watling Street: Paulinus defeats the rebels, using a flying wedge formation, imposes wide-ranging punishments on native Britons, and the Romanization of Britain continues. Boudica either poisons herself, or falls sick and dies.

=== By topic ===
==== Religion ====
- The First Epistle of Peter, if by Peter, is probably written between this year and c. AD 64.
- Paul of Tarsus journeys to Rome, but is shipwrecked on Malta. He stays for three months and converts Publius, the first bishop of Malta.
- Paul's Epistle to the Philippians is written from Rome. (approximate date)

==== Art and science ====
- Hero of Alexandria writes Metrica, Mechanics, and Pneumatics.
- AD 60–79 – House of the Vettii, Pompeii, is rebuilt.

== Births ==
- Buddhamitra, Indian Buddhist nun (approximate date)
- Marcus Vitorius Marcellus, Roman politician (approximate date)
- Nicomachus, Greek mathematician (approximate date)

== Deaths ==
- Abdagases I, king of the Parthian Empire (approximate date)
- Boudica, British queen of the Iceni tribe (approximate date)
- Peter of Rates, first bishop of Braga (approximate date)
