= Military history of Birmingham =

The city of Birmingham, in England, has a long military history and has been for several centuries a major manufacturer of weapons.

== Roman Britain ==
At Metchley Park, near Harborne, there are the remains of two large 1st century Roman forts, it is believed that they were used as a base during the invasion of Britain and could have been used in the first north-western advance into Cheshire and Wales. Much of the site is now gone; the construction of the banks of the Worcester and Birmingham Canal resulted in part destruction of the southern extremity of the camp, including most of its fort. The most recent excavation took place in 1999 and it was established that the main fort probably housed a cohors equitata milliaria, this comprised a minimum mixed force of 1,000 men who were heavily armoured foot-soldiers with a complement of a lightly armed cavalry unit.

In the 19th century people theorized that the camp was built by the ancient Britons (a theory supported by its being adjacent to the line of Ryknild Street) which runs through the area, others proposed that it was built by the Danes although no factual evidence supports this theory. Some few pieces of ancient weapons, such as swords and battle axes, and portions of bucklers have been found at the site.

Excavations have uncovered Roman granaries, storehouses, barracks, a rampart with timber towers, a guard chamber, various smaller buildings, pottery and tools. These have dated the fort to a few years after the Romans first landed in Kent. It is now thought that the site was abandoned by the end of the 1st century.

=== Roman artefacts discovery ===
In June 2006 new Roman artefacts were discovered next to a McDonald's in Kings Norton.

Local archaeologist Peter Osborn has suggested that there is a strong possibility that the battle between ancient Briton warrior queen Boadicea and the Romans took place in or around the area now called Birmingham sometime during 61 AD.

"We know for certain that the battle between the 200,000 ancient Britons and the Romans happened somewhere in the Midlands." "This spot is on the route to Metchley, the Roman fort in Birmingham and it's for this reason, if no other, that we think this could be where the battle took place".

However Dr Simon Esmonde Cleary, an archaeology expert at the University of Birmingham, remains sceptical.

The short answer is we don't know where the battle took place, anybody's guess is as good as anyone else's. The last time we had Boudicca was in what is now Hertfordshire. We know the Roman Army was coming down from Wales. It would be fascinating if it were true but, as yet, I haven't seen any evidence it is.

Until recently suggestions for the battle field site range from Leicestershire to Warwickshire.

The construction of new apartments has been put on hold until a full excavation is completed.

== 16th century: the Spanish Armada ==
By the early 16th century Birmingham was already a centre of metal working for example when Henry VIII was making plans to invaded Scotland in 1523 Birmingham smithies supplied bulk orders for bodkin arrowheads for use by his army.

In 1538 churchman John Leialand passed through the Midlands and wrote:

The Beauty of Bermingham a Good Markett Towne in the extreame partes of Warwike-shire is one Street going up alonge almost from the left Ripe of the Brooke ["that rises, some say 4 or 5 miles [away] towards the Black Hilles"] up a meane Hill by the length of a Quarter of a Mile. I saw many Smithes in the Towne that use to make Knives and all mannour of cutting Tooles, and many Loriners tat make Bittes, and a great many Naylors. Soe that a great part of the Towne is maintained by Smithes whoe have their Iron (Note: "Yren out of Staffordshire and Warwikeshire and See Coale out of Staffordshire" (Leland & Hearne 1744, p. 109 footnote 2)) and Sea Cole out of Stafford-shire.

The two main towns responsible for military weapons at this time were Birmingham and London, Henry VIII however did not look kindly on British made weapons and he turned to Italy for help in the manufacture of bronze cannons, he bought shells and bombs from the Dutch and much of the armoury and swords came from the more experienced Flemish. The majority of gunpowder was delivered from Antwerp until the threatened invasion by the Spanish in 1588. Howard of Effingham and Sir Francis Drake failed to capitalise on an initial victory over Philip II of Spain's fleet and allowed it to sail up the Channel due to low supplies of imported gunpowder, this proved the importance of more British arms manufacture as opposed to relying on imports.

During the attempted invasion by the Spanish Armada, the nobility and gentry of Birmingham and adjoining counties, contributed large sums of money which are said to have been sufficient to hire and equip around 43 war ships. A 19th century book of the region's history describes a subscription of £25 each from William Kinge and William Collmer (Colmore), of Burmingham; Richard Middlemore, Edgbaston; Mrs. Margarett Knowlys, Nuneaton; Gabriell Powltney, Knowle and Richard Corbett, Meryden, &c.

== 17th century: the English Civil War ==
By the early part of the 17th century Birmingham resembled a large sprawling smith's village. Aided by the abundance of nearby sources of coal and iron ore, many metal workers set up small foundries and workshops. Birmingham was an important manufacturing town with a reputation for producing small arms, and the village's trade stretched far and wide. In 1637 a London cutler protested against the import of 'Bromedgham blades' which were often made of similar standard but at a lower cost.

Unlike nearby towns such as Tamworth, Dudley, Hartlebury, Wolverhampton, Coventry, Burton and Lichfield Birmingham had little or no military defences.

In 1642 unrest between the Royalist (Worcestershire) and the Parliamentarians (Warwickshire) lead to many small battles and skirmishes taking place in the surrounding countryside. The allegiances around Birmingham were blurred with a mishmash of landowners, nobility and gentry all fighting for different sides.

The Royalists first passed through Birmingham proper in great force in 1642, the town was mainly Puritan, and some looting took place. As an apology to the town King Charles ordered two of his captains to be hanged, this did not appease the town and some time later a baggage train of the king was captured and delivered to Warwick. With further unrest both sides prepared for war, the smiths of Birmingham were called upon and over 15,000 sword blades were manufactured, these were supplied to Parliamentarian forces only.

Kings Norton and Hawksley both acted as battlefields during October, Prince Rupert's troops were ambushed with many casualties, although both sides claimed the upper hand (see Battle of Kings Norton).

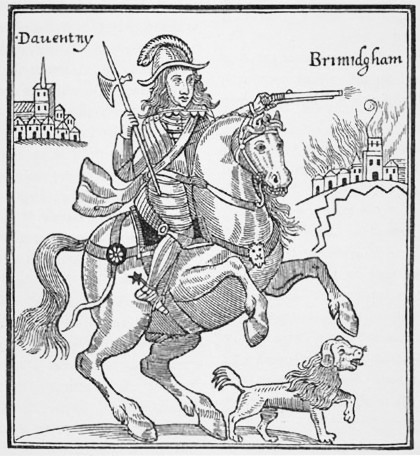
Front of a Parliamentarian pamphlet A True Relation of Prince Ruperts Barbarous Cruelty against the Towne of Brumingham.

In March 1643 Prince Rupert in command of about 1,900 men requested entry to the unfortified town which was refused by about 200 towns folk and a company of Roundheads from the garrison at Lichfield under the command of Captain Richard Greaves. The Battle of Camp Hill started with a direct assault by the Cavaliers on the earthworks at Camp Hill, after being twice repulsed the Cavaliers captured the earthworks by launching flanking attack with their cavalry. The Cavaliers pursued the fleeing townsmen into Birmingham where they came under fire from some houses, which they torched. At the far end of the town at Cape Hill the Roundhead troopers charged and successfully checked the Cavaliers, killing their officer William, Earl of Denbigh, and allowing Graves and his men to retreat unmolested back to Lichfield.

The laws of war at that time allowed for the burning of property in an undefended (unfortified) town of village if soldiers were shot at from those properties. Those houses from which shooting was thought to originate were set on fire by the Royalists, the inhabitants of whom were not allowed to quench the fires or to recover their movable possessions. About 80 houses were "burnt to ashes" (some of which belonged to Royalist sympathises), and some 15 men, and two women were killed, with many more wounded and left destitute. The Historian Trevor Royal writing in 2004 states "By laying waste to the town and setting fire to many of its houses, Rupert's force provided parliament with a propaganda coup ... Charles rebuked Rupert for his men's behaviour — the prince had in fact done his best to curb his men ... but the damage was done: Birmingham had paid the price for supporting parliament and being seen to profit from it".

Birmingham, continued to manufacture weapons of all kinds during this period and was heavily relied upon by Parliamentary armies for such wares. It remained on the borders between the largely Cavalier garrisoned Worcestershire and Roundhead garrisoned Warwickshire. Colonel Tinker Fox operated from Edgbaston House close to Birmingham and probably took place in the attack on Aston Hall on 28 December 1643, removing the main royalist base in the Birmingham. He and his garrison actively raided into Worcestershire during the First Civil War. Perhaps his most famous exploit was a commando style raid on Bewdley which resulted in the capture of Sir Thomas Lyttelton its governor.

By the last quarter of the 17th century, the population of Birmingham was somewhere between 4,000 and 15,000. Birmingham's small arms manufacture continued and during the mid-to-late 17th century Birmingham smiths were renowned for their manufacture of quality weapons (Alexander Missen in his Travels on visiting Milan noted that "fine works of rock-crystal, swords, heads of canes, snuffboxes, and other fine works of steel" could be purchased in Milan but that "they can be had better and cheaper in Birmingham"). There is no evidence that firearms were manufactured in Birmingham until the 1690s when the Office of Ordinance issued a warrant to "pay John Smart for Thomas Hadley, and the rest of the Gunmakers of Birmingham, one debenture of four-score and sixteen pounds eight shillings, dated ye 14th of July 1690", but it is unlikely that guns were not manufactured in Birmingham before that date. It is more likely that when Sir Richard Newdigate approached manufacturers in the town in 1689 with the notion of supplying the British Government with small arms, it was important that they would need to be of high enough calibre to equal the small arms that were imported from abroad. After a successful trial order in 1692, the Government placed its first contract. On 5 January 1693 the "Officers of Ordnance" chose five local firearms manufacturers to initially produce 200 "snaphance musquets" per month over the period of one year, paying 17 shillings per musket, plus 3 shillings per hundredweight for delivery to London.

== 18th century ==
Gun manufacture in Birmingham continued to develop, mainly around the Digbeth area but also in what was later to become known as the Gun Quarter.

A meeting was held 5 October 1745, by the 6th Regiment of Foot for the raising of a regiment of volunteers to oppose The '45 Jacobite rebellion.

The town contributed to a fund to repel the rumoured invasion by France in 1758.

The 6th Regiment of Foot recruited in the county of Warwickshire in 1778 so successfully that it was called "The Warwickshire," Birmingham supplying a large proportion of the men, and raising by public subscription £2,000 towards their equipment.

In August 1782 a corps was organised in 1782, but it must have disbanded soon afterwards. When, as an aid to recruiting, territorial links to infantry regiments were first established in 1782, the 6th became the 1st Warwickshire Regiment, reflecting their recent connections with the county. During the French Revolutionary Wars in 1794 in the West Indies, the 6th took part in the capture of Martinique, Guadeloupe and St Lucia from the French and in Casdebar in August 1798 they gained a Battle Honour.

In 1798 when it seemed that revolution might break out two companies of cavalry and one of infantry were raised, each one 500 strong under the command of Captain Pearson and Lord Broke. They were called the Birmingham Loyal Association of Volunteers and held their first parade on Coleshill Street on 15 August 1797. The infantry were armed with muskets brought from Prussia. The Loyal Association held their first parade in Coleshill Street, 15 August 1797. On 4 June 1798, a grand review was held on Birmingham Heath (then unenclosed), "to the delight of the local belles, who knew not which the most to admire, the scarlet horse or the blue foot". Over 100,000 spectators were said to have been present.

With the many gunmakers and workshops the quality of gun manufacture in the town needed to be controlled. Government viewing rooms were opened in Bagot Street in 1798, employing sixty or seventy people to ensure that guns produced were of the necessary standard to provide for the British army. Military use, however, was accompanied by a major market in the Atlantic slave trade. A 1788 Parliamentary report counted over 4,000 gun makers, with 100,000 guns a year going to slave traders.

== 19th century ==
The Birmingham Volunteers had the honour of escorting Lord Nelson when, with Lady Hamilton, he visited the town in 1802. At a review on 2 August 1804, the regiment were presented with its colours, and for years the "Loyals" were the most popular men of the period.

The Handsworth Volunteer Cavalry do not seem to have been more backward than the Birmingham Volunteers, though why it was necessary that the services of the Handsworth Cavalry should be required to charge and put to flight the rioters in Snow Hill on 29 May 1810 is not very clear.

Duddeston Barracks were built in 1793, at a cost of £13,000, as a consequence of the riots of the city in 1791.

In 1809, a statue of Lord Nelson was opened in the Bull Ring, in memory of the men who died in the battle of Trafalgar in 1805.

Boulton struck a line medal in commemoration of the Battle of Trafalgar, and by permission of the Government gave one to every person who took part in the action; flag-officers and commanders receiving copies in gold, lieutenants, &c., in silver, and the men, bronze. Being struck for this purpose only, and not for sale, the medal is very scarce.

The services of the Handsworth Volunteer Cavalry were required to charge and put to flight the rioters in Snow Hill on 29 May 1810.

The Orsim bombs used in Paris, 15 January 1858, were made in the city.

The official Natal Day could be argued as 14 December 1859, when a town's meeting was held "for the purpose of adopting such measures as might seem desirable for placing Birmingham in its proper position with regard to the great national rifle movement". The Hon. Charles Granville Scott had been previously selected by Lord Leigh (the Lord-Lieutenant of the County) as Colonel, Major Sanders had accepted the Captaincy, Mr. J.O. Mason been appointed Lieutenant, and 111 names entered on the roll of members of the 1st Company, but it was not until the above-named day that the movement really made progress, the Mayor (Mr. Thos. Lloyd), Sir John Ratcliff, Mr. A. Dixon, and Mr. J. Lloyd each then promising to equip his twenty men apiece, and sundry other gentlemen aiding to dress up others of the rank and file.

The money thus being found the men were soon forthcoming too, the end of the year showing 320 names on the roll call, a number increased to 1,080 by the close of 1860. The latter year saw the first parade in Calthorpe Park, the opening of the range at Bournbrook, and the formation of the twelve companies forming the first battalion, but, notwithstanding many liberal donations (the gunmakers giving £850), and the proceeds of the first annual ball, it closed with the corps being in debt by over £1,000. On the formation of the 2nd county battalion, Col. Scott took command thereof, Major Sanders being promoted. He was followed by Lieut.-Col. Mason, on whose resignation, in February 1867, Major Ratcliff succeeded, the battalion being then 1,161 strong. Col. Ratcliff retired in June 1871, and was replaced by Major-General Hinde, C.B., who held command until his death, 1 March 1881. Major Gem who temporarily acted as commander, also died the following 4 November (1881), Major Burt filling the post until the appointment of Col. W. Swynfen Jervis. The first adjutant (appointed in 1860) was Captain McInnis, who retired in 1870, having received bodily injuries through being thrown from his horse; he was succeeded by Adjutant-Colonel Tarte.

The first uniform of the corps was a grey tunic with green facings, and a peaked cap with cock's feathers; in 1863 this was changed for a green uniform with red facings, similar to that worn by the 60th Rifles, with the exception of a broad red stripe on the trousers. The trouser stripe was done away with in 1875, when also the cap and feathers gave place to the busby and glengarry, the latter in 1884 being exchanged for the regulation army helmet, and soon perhaps our boys will all be seen in scarlet like their brothers of the Staffordshire battalions. The annual balls did not become popular, the last taking place in 1864; bazaars were held 14–17 October 1863, and 24–27 October 1876; athletic displays had been given (the first in May 1865).

At the Volunteer Review, 24 July 1861, before the Duke of Cambridge; at the Hyde Park Review, June 1865, before the Prince of Wales; at the Midland Counties' Review at Derby, June 1867; at the Royal Review at Windsor in 1868; and at every inspection since, the Birmingham corps has received positive feedback; it was one of the crack corps of the kingdom.

The first march-out of 720 to Sutton took place 21 June 1875, others joining at the camp, making over 800 being under canvas, 744 attending the review. The camping-out at Streetly Wood had annually recurred since that date; the first sham fight took place 20 June 1877. The "coming-of-age" was celebrated by a dinner at the Midland Hotel, 29 January 1881, up to which point the Government grants had amounted to £26,568 14 s (£26,568.70), the local subscriptions to £8,780, and the donations to £1,956 1 s 3 d (£1,956.06) The Birmingham Rifle Corps is now recognised as the First Volunteer Battalion of the Royal Warwickshire Regiment, having been linked to the "Saucy Sixth", under the army scheme of 1873.

The Midland Rifle Club was started in 1875, the Staffordshire Rifle Association dating from 1861. Both clubs used the range at Sandwell Park, by permission of the Earl of Dartmouth. At the International Match at Creedmoor, New York, in 1881, the representatives of this neighbourhood scored high numbers, Corporal Bates (of the M.R.C.) taking the only first prize secured by visitors in the open competitions of the U.S. Associations.

In 1881 The Royal Warwickshire Fusiliers were created drawing massively from the city's stock. The Royal Warwickshire Regiment reorganised as the county regiment of Warwickshire, encompassing also its Militia and Volunteer infantry.

Around this time an official report showed that the Warwickshire regiment could muster 213 Yeomanry Cavalry on parade; while the Staffordshire had 422.

== 20th century ==
=== World War I ===
The Warwickshire regiment drew massively from the Birmingham area especially in the first world war, an initial recruitment drive in the city mustered over 8000 men to fight in British regiments. Due to the successful recruitment the government advertised again and subsequently recruited a further 4000 volunteers, initially named the 1st, 2nd and 3rd city battalion, they were later merged into The Royal Warwickshire Regiment. These forces later went on to fight in the trenches of the first world war.

The Company's post-war programme included, for a short time, a range of aeroplanes.

The Austin Greyhound 2 seater fighter was one, and the Austin Ball single seater another. Then there was a single seater biplane with folding wings, which sold at £500, and a fourth called the Austin Whippet. There was many killed.

Percussion caps were yearly sent from Brum in millions of grosses, the manufacture of the complete gun cartridge came later.

The manufacture of the caps involved several dangerous processes, and Birmingham has had to mourn the loss of many of her children through accidents arising therefrom.

The ammunition works of Messrs. Kynoch and Co., at Witton, covered over 20 acres (80,000 m^{2}), and gave employment to several hundred people, the contrariness of human nature being exemplified in the fact that the death-dealing articles were mainly manufactured by females, the future mothers or wives perchance of men to be laid low by the use of such things. The plant was capable of turning out 500,000 cartridges per day, as was done during the Turkish war, and it took 50 tons of rolled brass, 100 tons of lead, and 20 tons of gunpowder weekly to keep the factory fully going, all kinds of ammunition for rifles and machine guns being made on the premises. Other extensive works were those of the Birmingham Small Arms and Metal Co., at Adderley Park Mills, and the National Arms and Ammunition Co., at Small Heath, and Perry Barr.

=== Interwar ===
In 1936 the government purchased a site next to the Castle Bromwich Aerodrome which was developed into Castle Bromwich Aircraft Factory.

=== World War II ===
1 September 1939 - Approximately 75,000 Birmingham school children were evacuated to make way for the Battle of Britain. On 8 August 1940 the first air-raid on Birmingham took place over Erdington. During Birminghams 27 enemy air raids an official request by the Government to news editors not to publish such reports left the city's bereaved quite indignant and bitter.

Over 2,000 women, children and elderly were killed and 3,000 more were seriously injured in the air raids, many of the attacks were aimed at the thousands of factories that manufactured weapons of war, including the Castle Bromwich aeroplane factory that mass-produced the Spitfire fighter aircraft. The longest raid took place on 11 December and lasted 13 hours, King George VI inspected damage the next day. Finally, 60 years after the end of the Second World War, a memorial is now in place by the new Bull Ring to commemorate the civilians who died during air raids, naming all those who were killed or gave up their lives protecting the city.

B.S.A. and Longbridge turned their hands to the British war effort once again.

=== Post-war period ===
The Royal Warwickshire Fusiliers were absorbed in 1968 and were combined with the other 3 Fusilier Regiments (The Royal Northumberland Fusiliers, The Lancashire Fusiliers and The Royal Fusiliers) to form the Royal Regiment Of Fusiliers.

Selly Oak Hospital closed completely in 2012. All military personnel are now treated at the recently built Queen Elizabeth Hospital in Birmingham which is now the new home of the Royal Centre for Defence Medicine, which cares for injured service men and women from conflict zones, as well as training Army, Navy and Air Force medical staff.

HMS Daring, the first Type 45 destroyer is affiliated to the city of Birmingham.

== See also ==
- Gun Quarter
- Economic history of Birmingham
