= Clive Standen =

English actor

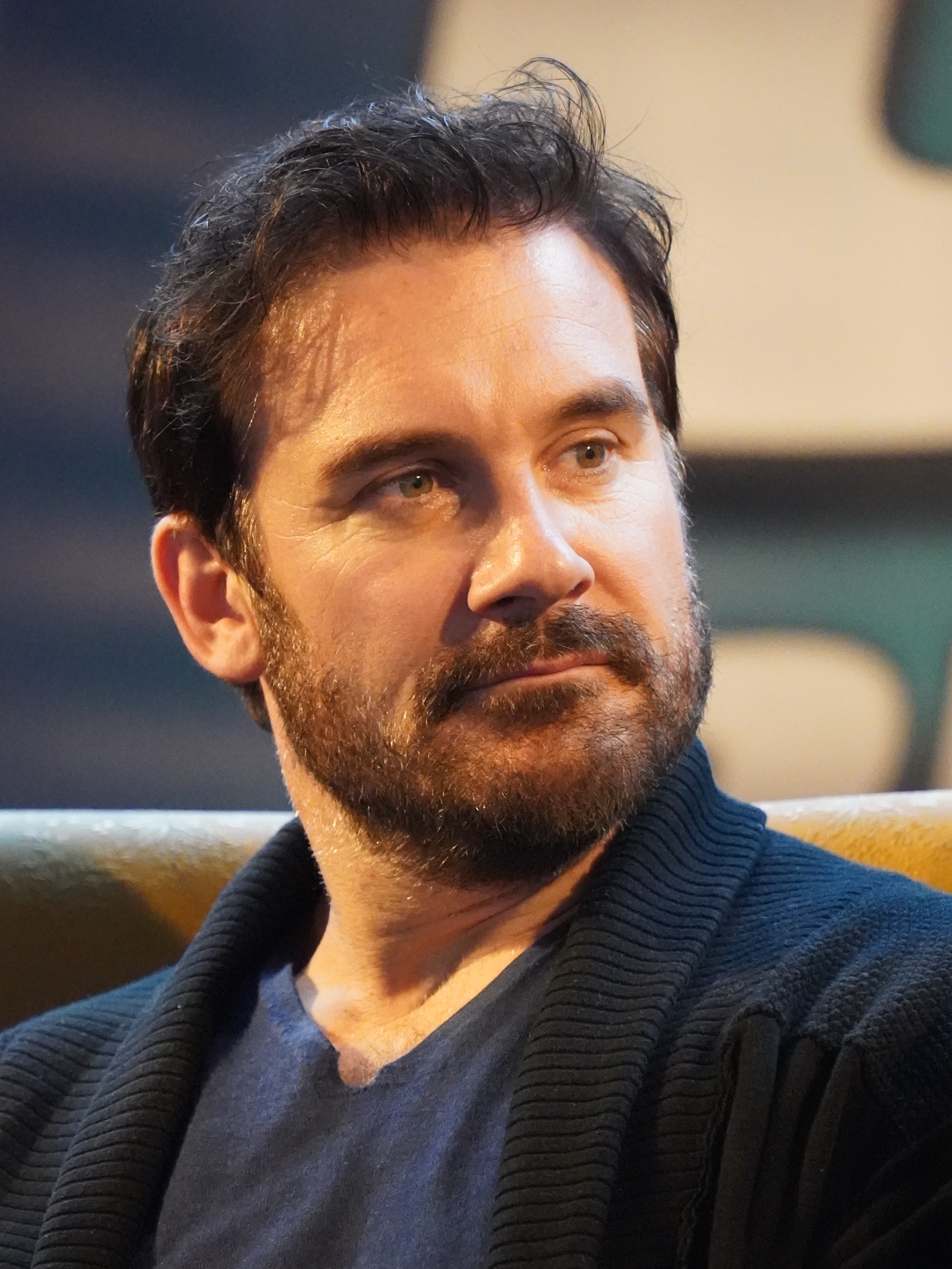
- Standen in 2024
- Born: 1981 or 1982 (age 44–45); Holywood, Northern Ireland
- Occupation: Actor
- Years active: 1999–present
- Spouse: Lucy Martin (m. 2024)

Clive James Standen (born July 22, 1981) is an English actor best known for playing Bryan Mills in the NBC series Taken (2017–2018), based on the film trilogy of the same name, as well as Rollo in the History Channel series Vikings (2013–2018), Sir Gawain in the Starz series Camelot, Archer in the BBC One series Robin Hood, Demetrian Titus in Warhammer 40,000: Space Marine 2 and Secret Level, and Private Carl Harris in the BBC science-fiction programme Doctor Who.

== Early life and education ==
Standen was born on a British Army base in Holywood, County Down, Northern Ireland, and grew up in Leicestershire, East Midlands, England. He went to school at the King Edward VII School, Melton Mowbray followed by a performing arts course at Melton Mowbray College. Standen then went on to earn a place on the 3 year diploma course in Acting at the London Academy of Music and Dramatic Art. Away from acting, in his late teens Standen was an international Muay Thai boxer and later Fencing gold medalist.

== Career ==
Standen's first experience of stunts, horse riding and sword fighting was at age 12 when he got his first job working in a professional stunt team in Nottingham. At the age of 15 Standen was a member of both the National Youth Theatre and the National Youth Music Theatre performing in productions at many well known venues. Later Standen won a place on the three-year acting course at the London Academy of Music and Dramatic Art.

In 2004, Standen appeared in the Second World War documentary drama Ten Days to D-Day; and took the lead role of Major Alan Marshall in Zero Hour a TV dramatisation of Special Air Service mission operation Barras in Sierra Leone. The next year he appeared in three episodes of the British soap Doctors and Tom Brown's Schooldays, the acclaimed ITV adaptation of the book by Thomas Hughes. Standen played Private Carl Harris in three episodes of the fourth series of the relaunched British sci-fi programme Doctor Who. The following year he played Archer, the half-brother of Robin Hood in the BBC One series Robin Hood. Standen was part of the main cast of the TV series Camelot for Starz in which he portrayed the famous Arthurian knight Sir Gawain.

In film, Standen took a supporting role in the mainstream Bollywood film Namastey London, starring Akshay Kumar and Katrina Kaif. In 2012, Standen completed filming on the Vertigo Films feature film Hammer of the Gods. He is a series lead on the History Channel's Vikings in the role of Rollo. Clive portrayed Bryan Mills in the television adaptation of Taken then starred as Colonel Knox in the Screen Gems thriller film Patient Zero. Standen was cast in the main role of Anthony Lavelle for NBC's Council of Dads;

In 2021, Standen and Amy Bailey (who played Kwenthrith in Vikings) teamed up to create the Vikcast podcast about the Vikings TV series they will co-host, with Bailey stating: "We've gathered our beloved castmates, production members, and celebrity guests to talk about the show and everything beyond."

In addition to his screen roles, Standen has done voice overs for video games such as Aliens vs. Predator and Inversion. He also lent his voice to the video game Warhammer 40,000: Space Marine II, portraying Lieutenant Demetrian Titus as a replacement for Mark Strong, who had voiced Titus in the first game.

== Personal life ==
Standen is a spokesman for Sea Shepherd Conservation Society. In September 2024, Standen married actress Lucy Martin in Provence, France.

== Filmography ==
=== Film ===
| Year | Title | Role | Notes |
|---|---|---|---|
| 2004 | Ten Days to D-Day | Canadian Commanding Officer | |
| 2005 | Tom Brown's Schooldays | Brooke | Television film |
| 2006 | Heroes and Villains | Pete | |
| 2007 | Namastey London | Charlie Brown | Bollywood film |
| 2010 | Eating Dust | Spence | |
| 2012 | Hammer of the Gods | Hagen | |
| 2015 | Everest | Ed Viesturs | |
| 2018 | Patient Zero | Colonel Knox | |
| 2018 | In Like Flynn | Charlie | |
| 2019 | Vault | Chucky | |
| 2022 | Vendetta | William Duncan | |
| 2023 | Boudica: The Queen of War | Prasutagus | |
| 2024 | Clear Cut | Jack | |

=== Television ===
| Year | Title | Role | Notes |
|---|---|---|---|
| 2004 | Waking the Dead | Martin Raynor | 2-part episode |
| 2005 | Doctors | Charlie Halliday | 3 episodes |
| 2007 | Zero Hour | Major Alan Marshall | 1 episode |
| 2008 | Doctor Who | Private Harris | 3 episodes |
| 2009 | Robin Hood | Archer | 3 episodes |
| 2010 | Camelot | Sir Gawain | Series regular, 10 episodes |
| 2011 | Banged Up Abroad | David Scott | 1 episode |
| 2013–2018 | Vikings | Rollo | Series regular (season 1–4); Special guest (season 5) |
| 2014 | Atlantis | Telemon | 2 episodes |
| 2017–2018 | Taken | Bryan Mills | Series regular, 26 episodes |
| 2020 | Mirage | Gabriel Taylor | Series regular, 6 episodes |
| 2020 | Council of Dads | Anthony Lavelle | Series regular, 10 episodes |
| 2023–2025 | The Morning Show | Andre Ford | 5 episodes |
| 2023 | Obliterated | Liam | 1 episode |
| 2024 | Secret Level | Lieutenant Demetrian Titus | 1 episode |
| 2025 | Arabia's best kept secrets with Clive Standen | Self | 4 episodes |
| 2025 | Sanctuary: A Witch's Tale | Lachlan Frey | 4 episodes |

=== Video games ===
| Year | Title | Voice role |
|---|---|---|
| 2010 | Aliens vs. Predator | Various lead Marines; Civilian characters |
| 2012 | Inversion | Leo / Gulthar |
| 2012 | Tom Clancy's Ghost Recon: Future Soldier | Kosak |
| 2024 | Warhammer 40,000: Space Marine 2 | Lieutenant Demetrian Titus |
| 2024 | Warhammer 40,000: Warpforge | Lieutenant Demetrian Titus |

=== Stage ===
| Year | Title | Character | Venue |
|---|---|---|---|
| 2006 | The Invention of Love | Moses Jackson | Salisbury Playhouse |
| 2000 | West Side Story | Diesel | Royal Albert Hall |
| 1999–2000 | The Ballad of Salmon Pavey | Nathanial Giles | Globe Theatre |

=== Others ===
| Year | Title | Voice role |
|---|---|---|
| 2025 | Warhammer 40,000: 500 Worlds - Cinematic Trailer | Captain Demetrian Titus |
