= Anted =

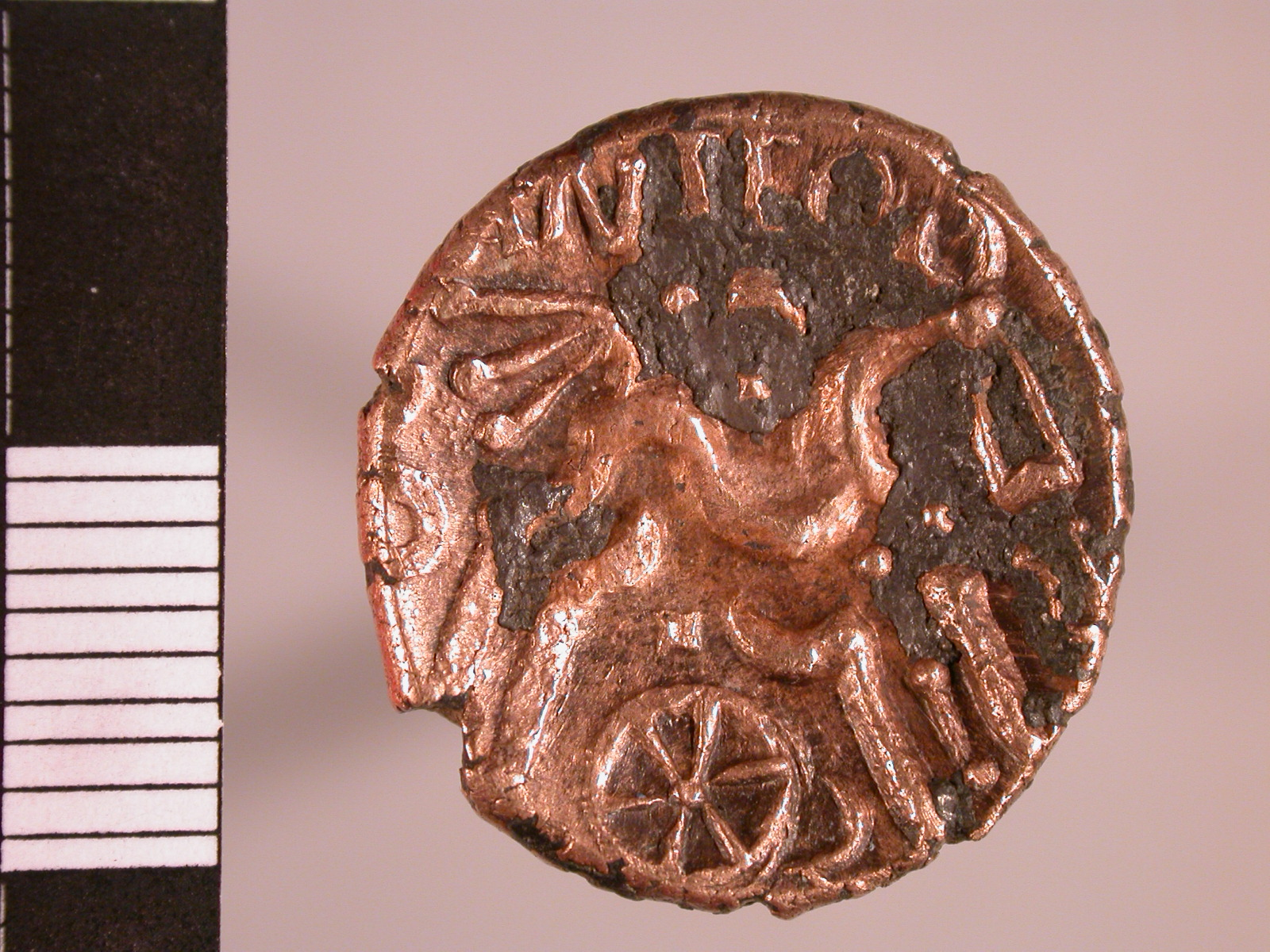
Reverse of stater of Antedios

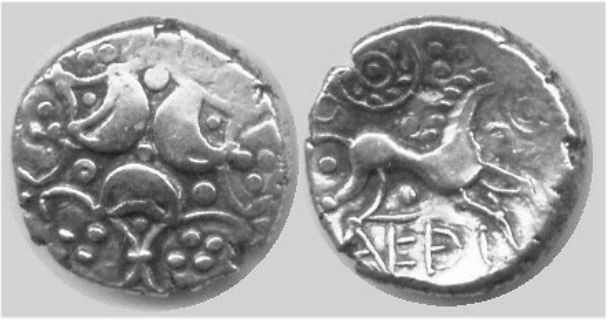
An Iron Age Gold stater of Anted

Anted is the name of the coins issued by Antedios (or Anted), an ancient king of the Iceni, a Brythonic tribe who inhabited the present day county of Norfolk in Britain from approximately the 1st century BCE until the 1st century CE.

Only the first five letters appears on his coinage, the ending -ios is conjectural.
