= Lucy Martin =

Lucy Martin may refer to:

- Lucy Martin (actress) (born 1991), English actress, singer, and dancer
- Lucy Martin (cyclist) (born 1990), English retired professional road- and track cyclist
