= Clear Cut (2024 film) =

- Directed by: Brian Skiba
- Written by: Joe Perruccio; Eric Bromberg
- Produced by: Corey William Large; Eric Bromberg
- Starring: Clive Standen; Stephen Dorff; Alec Baldwin
- Distributed by: Lionsgate
- Release date: July 19, 2024
- Running time: 88 minutes
- Country: United States
- Language: English

Clear Cut (formerly titled Cold Deck) is a 2024 American thriller film written by Joe Perruccio and Eric Bromberg, directed by Brian Skiba and starring Clive Standen, Stephen Dorff and Alec Baldwin.

== Cast ==
- Clive Standen as Jack
- Jesse Metcalfe as Eli
- Tom Welling as Keen
- Stephen Dorff as Ike
- Alec Baldwin as Sam
- Lucy Martin as Becca
- Lochlyn Munro as Bo
- Chelsey Reist as Jasmine
- Tom Stevens as Jacob
- Mike Dopud as Agent Keller
- Elena Sanchez as Hiker
- Sophia Shaw as Park Ranger
- Fawn Damara Robson as Charlie Bar Girl

== Production ==
In August 2023, it was announced that filming had been completed prior to the 2023 SAG-AFTRA strike.

== Release ==
The film was released on July 19, 2024.

== Reception ==
The film has a 0% rating on Rotten Tomatoes based on 12 reviews. Jeffrey Anderson of Common Sense Media awarded the film two stars out of five.
