= Antedios =

British Celtic king

Antedios or Anted was an ancient king of the Iceni, a Brythonic tribe who inhabited the present day county of Norfolk in Britain from approximately the 1st century BCE until the 1st century CE.

Antedios came to power in 25 CE, succeeding the Icenian ruler Can. Evidence indicates that Antedios remained neutral during the Roman invasion of Britain in 43 CE, and was later made a client of Rome. Antedios issued coins bearing his own name - Anted - but later retracted the issuance, probably under pressure from other Icenian nobles. He then issued coins bearing the inscription "ECEN" referring to the name of the tribe.

It is most probable that Antedios died before the end of the Icenian War of 47 CE, because after the war, power was passed to the pro-Roman leader Prasutagus, and Antedios was never heard of again.
