= AD 113 =

113 in various calendars
- Gregorian calendar: 113; CXIII
- Ab urbe condita: 866
- Assyrian calendar: 4863
- Balinese saka calendar: 34–35
- Bengali calendar: −481 – −480
- Berber calendar: 1063
- Buddhist calendar: 657
- Burmese calendar: −525
- Byzantine calendar: 5621–5622
- Chinese calendar: 壬子年 (Water Rat); 2810 or 2603 — to — 癸丑年 (Water Ox); 2811 or 2604
- Coptic calendar: −171 – −170
- Discordian calendar: 1279
- Ethiopian calendar: 105–106
- Hebrew calendar: 3873–3874
- Hindu calendars
- Vikram Samvat: 169–170
- Shaka Samvat: 34–35
- Kali Yuga: 3213–3214
- Holocene calendar: 10113
- Iranian calendar: 509 BP – 508 BP
- Islamic calendar: 525 BH – 524 BH
- Javanese calendar: N/A
- Julian calendar: 113; CXIII
- Korean calendar: 2446
- Minguo calendar: 1799 before ROC 民前1799年
- Nanakshahi calendar: −1355
- Seleucid era: 424/425 AG
- Thai solar calendar: 655–656
- Tibetan calendar: ཆུ་ཕོ་བྱི་བ་ལོ་ (male Water-Rat); 239 or −142 or −914 — to — ཆུ་མོ་གླང་ལོ་ (female Water-Ox); 240 or −141 or −913

Year 113 (CXIII) was a common year starting on Saturday of the Julian calendar. At the time, it was known as the Year of the Consulship of Celsus and Crispinus (or, less frequently, year 866 Ab urbe condita). The denomination 113 for this year has been used since the early medieval period, when the Anno Domini calendar era became the prevalent method in Europe for naming years.

== Events ==
=== By place ===
==== Roman Empire ====
- Trajan's Column near the Colosseum in Rome is completed to commemorate the Emperor's victory over the Dacians in the Second Dacian War.
- Osroes I of Parthia violates the treaty with Rome by installing a puppet ruler in Armenia. Emperor Trajan marches east, without first attempting to use diplomacy to resolve the disagreement.
- Emperor Trajan sails from Rome to begin his expedition against Parthia. He arrives in Athens where Parthian envoys greet him with olive branches, a sign of peace.
- Basilica Ulpia is dedicated.

==== Asia ====
- Last (7th) year of Yongchu era of the Chinese Eastern Han dynasty.
- "Pattini dheivam" worship is inaugurated in Kannagi Temple in the Chera Kingdom in India, by Emperor Cenkuttuvan; the function is attended by GajaBahu, king of Central Sri Lanka (Mahavamso).

== Births ==
- Adrianus, Greek sophist philosopher (d. 193)
- Gnaeus Claudius Severus Arabianus, Roman senator and philosopher (d. after 176)

== Deaths ==
- Pliny the Younger, Roman lawyer and scientist (b. AD 61)
