= The Seed (2021 film) =

2021 British horror film

- Film poster
- Directed by: Sam Walker
- Written by: Sam Walker
- Starring: Lucy Martin; Chelsea Edge; Sophie Vavasseur
- Cinematography: Ben Ziryab
- Edited by: Barry Moen
- Music by: Lucrecia Dalt
- Production companies: Camelot Films; Hardman Pictures
- Distributed by: Shudder
- Release date: 5 October 2021 (Beyond Fest)
- Running time: 91 minutes
- Country: United Kingdom
- Language: English

The Seed is the 2021 science fiction body horror feature film directorial debut of Sam Walker, who also wrote the script. The movie premiered in the United States at Beyond Fest, after which it was released to Shudder as one of its original films. The film received mixed to positive reviews.

== Plot ==
Three friends, Deirdre, Charlotte, and Heather, have travelled to the Mojave Desert in order to livestream a meteor shower while staying at a palatial home owned by Heather's father. Deirdre is frustrated when their phones stop working, as she had hoped to use the event to further increase her standing as a social media influencer. A meteor crash lands on the property, and the women retrieve it, only to discover that it's a strange creature that resembles a naked mole-rat.

The following day, the creature appears to molt, shedding its rocky exterior. Unnerved by the creature, the women try to have their young gardener, Brett, get rid of it, but he fails to do so and flees the property as the creature is still alive. The women argue over whether they should kill or keep the creature, eventually agreeing against doing so for the time being.

That night, the creature cries so loudly that Charlotte brings it inside, much to Heather's anger. The women again argue until they decide that Charlotte and Heather should go into town and find someone to take it away. While they're gone, the creature hypnotizes Deirdre and rapes her. Charlotte and Heather go to their neighbor Edna's home, in hope of finding help. They instead find her home uninhabited while also discovering disturbing notebooks about the meteor shower. They return home, where they find Deirdre acting strangely. That night, the creature turns into a blob and rapes both Deirdre and Heather after similarly hypnotizing them.

The following morning, Charlotte becomes frightened by her friends' different personalities and the increasingly menacing activities of the creature. Charlotte returns to Edna's home in hopes of finding a car and fleeing the home but is unsuccessful. She re-examines the journals, revealing that Edna had also had an experience with a similar creature. Panicked, Charlotte goes outside and discovers that Edna had killed herself. She returns home, where the creature hypnotizes her and tries to rape her. But she breaks out of its hypnotizing ability.

After an argument between Deidre and Charlotte, Deirdre and Heather's bodies begin to change as their stomachs swell, after which they begin to vomit a strange black fluid. Enraged by the creature's actions, despite the wound to her scalp after being pushed into a wall by Deidre, Charlotte manages to kill it with some difficulty, but her friends remain changed. She then chases her friends outside, but is forced to kill Heather. Just as she is about to do the same to Deirdre, much to her dismay, a cowboy arrives and stops Charlotte by shooting her. He is killed by Deirdre, who in turn is finished off by Charlotte as an act of mercy. Just as she is about to flee, the meteor shower begins as Charlotte looks on in horror.

== Cast ==
- Lucy Martin as Deirdre
- Chelsea Edge as Charlotte
- Sophie Vavasseur as Heather
- Jamie Wittebrood as Brett
- Anthony Edridge as Cowboy
- Shirley Pisani as Edna

== Production ==
Prior to directing The Seed, Walker had only directed short films, making the movie his feature film directorial debut. He has cited Nicolas Roeg's The Man Who Fell to Earth, John Carpenter's The Thing, and Eraserhead, as inspirations for the movie, as well as the art of painter Ambera Wellmann. Walker designed the creature so that it would look like it could have come from the planet Earth, "so the girls didn't look stupid for [not] clocking an alien right away", and chose the design after googling pictures of animals that had washed up on beaches.

Walker used social media as an element for the film, likening it to how the creature was "kind of weak, blind, and strange, and have this something else inside it". He stated that social media "looks like it's one thing and you look at it -- yeah, that's cool, but you're doing something completely fucking different" and that "To me, The Seed represents how on social media, someone can watch one video that will then lead to something that begins to radicalize them."

Filming took place in Malta during 2020. Deadline noted that The Seed was a "rare example of a project to have been fully packaged and financed during lockdown." Lucy Martin was brought on to portray influencer Deirdre, a character she described as high energy and different from herself.

== Release ==
The film had its world premiere on 5 October 2021 at Beyond Fest in the United States and went on to screen at FrightFest London. The following year The Seed was released to horror streaming platform Shudder as a Shudder Original on 10 March.

== Reception ==
On the review aggregator website Rotten Tomatoes, 50% of 24 critics' reviews are positive, with an average rating of 5.80/10. The website's consensus reads: "Although its uneven story proves somewhat barren ground, The Seed offers a reasonably entertaining harvest for forgiving horror fans seeking a gory good time."

Common criticism focused on the film's pacing and atmosphere, while praise centered upon the special effects and creature design. Abby Olcese of RogerEbert.com panned the movie, writing that "A stronger balance of theme and scares would make “The Seed” something remarkable. Instead, it’s more like a top-notch effects reel with a lengthy prologue." Horror outlet Rue Morgue was more favorable, praising the film's themes and stating that "Walkers’ feature film debut has proven that he has an eye and mind to create a twisted blend of comedy and horror with the latter providing better results." Kim Newman also reviewed The Seed, opining "Some elements are wildly inventive, but it defaults to overfamiliar stuff (black oil leaking from eyes) and I kind of miss the era of Inseminoid and XTRO where British alien impregnation movies didn’t completely pretend to be American."
