= Lucy Martin (actress) =

British actress

- Born: Solihull, England
- Occupations: Actress, singer, dancer, choreographer
- Years active: 2009–present
- Spouse: Clive Standen (m. 2024)

Lucy Elise Martin is an English actress, singer, and dancer. She began her career on the West End. On television, she is known for her role in the History series Vikings (2019–2020). Her films include The Seed (2021) and Boudica (2023).

== Early life ==
Martin was born in Solihull to an English mother and a Scottish father and grew up in Knowle with her two older brothers and younger sister. Martin took ballet classes from as young as three and Stagecoach classes at the age of seven before joining the Solihull Ballet School and West Midlands Youth Ballet. She attended a local school in Knowle and then, at 16, auditioned for and was awarded a musical theatre scholarship to attend Tring Park School for the Performing Arts in Hertfordshire as a boarding student.

== Career ==
At 17, Martin made her professional stage debut and West End debut as a swing in Dirty Dancing at the Aldwych Theatre she also understudied and played the characters of Penny and Lisa. This was followed by another swing and understudy role on the international tour of Mamma Mia. Martin returned to the West End at 21 for her first major role as Lorraine in Jersey Boys at the Prince Edward Theatre and then Piccadilly Theatre.

In 2014, Martin performed as a dancer for Olly Murs's "Wrapped Up" rendition on The X Factor. She originated the role of Miss M in the world premiere of the rock musical 27 at the Cockpit Theatre in 2016, which she also choreographed assisting Arlene Philips. She would reprise her role as Miss M for the show's run at the Union Theatre, co-choreographing with Ryan Lee-Seeger.

Martin made her acting television debut as Penny Radcliffe in the 2017 Sky Atlantic drama Riviera. In 2019, she joined the cast of the History Channel series Vikings for its sixth and final season as Queen Ingrid.

In 2021, Martin made her feature film debut as Valentina in The Grand Duke of Corsica with Timothy Spall and had her first lead film role as Deirdre in the science fiction horror film The Seed, which was released on Shudder the following year. This was followed by further film roles as Gilly Belcher in the biopic Prizefighter: The Life of Jem Belcher and Cartimanda in Boudica. She also appeared in the Sky Atlantic comedy-drama I Hate Suzie Too and Julia Hoppen and the ITV series Malpractice as Camilla Woodham.

== Personal life ==
In February 2023, Martin became engaged to actor Clive Standen. They married in September 2024 in Provence, France.

== Filmography ==
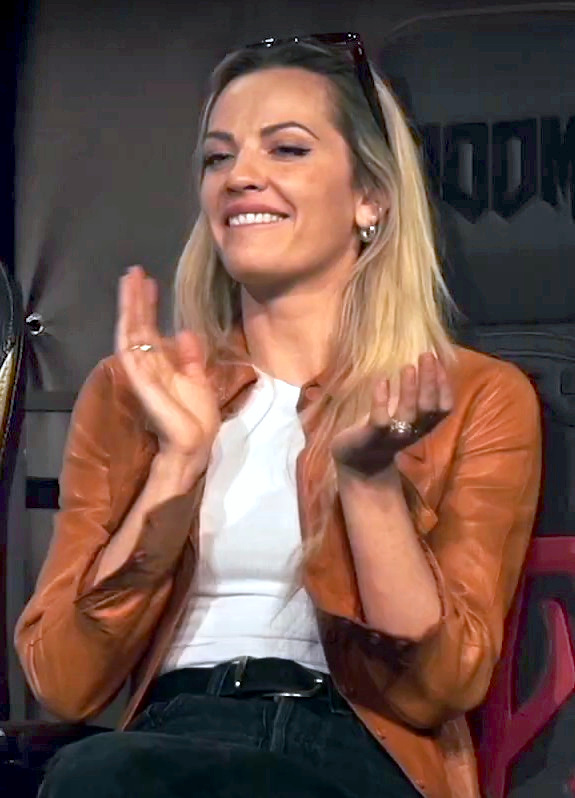
Lucy Martin in German Comic Con 2022

=== Film ===
Year	Title	Role	Notes
2021	The Grand Duke of Corsica	Valentina	
2021	The Seed	Deirdre	
2022	Prizefighter: The Life of Jem Belcher	Gilly Belcher	
2023	Boudica	Cartimanda	
2024	Clear Cut	Becca	

=== Television ===
Year	Title	Role	Notes
2017	Riviera	Penny Radcliffe	2 episodes
2019–2020	Vikings	Queen Ingrid	18 episodes
2022	I Hate Suzie Too	Julia Hoppen	1 episode
2023	Malpractice	Camilla Woodham	2 episodes

=== Music videos ===
Song	Year	Artist	Notes
"Shooting Star"	2015	The Big Bads	
"Lose My Mind"	2015	RIVA	
"Lights"	2015	Hurts	
"Hurricane"	2016	Matt Wills	

== Stage ==
Year	Title	Role	Notes
2009	Dirty Dancing	Swing / Penny and Lisa understudy	Aldwych Theatre, London
2010–2011	Mamma Mia	Swing / Ali understudy	International tour
2013	Rays of Sunshine	Dancer	Charity concert Royal Albert Hall, London
2013–2014	Jersey Boys	Lorraine	Prince Edward Theatre / Piccadilly Theatre, London
2016	27	Miss M	Cockpit Theatre / Union Theatre, London
