= Hawksley =

Hawksley is an English surname. Notable people with the surname include:

- Charles Hawksley (1839–1917), English civil engineer
- Dominic Hawksley, British actor
- Dorothy Hawksley (1884–1970), British painter
- Humphrey Hawksley (born 1964), British journalist
- James Hawksley (born 1989), Australian football player
- Lucinda Hawksley (born 1970), English writer
- Roy Hawksley (born 1942), English rugby player
- Thomas Hawksley (1807–1893), English civil engineer
- Warren Hawksley (1943–2018), British politician
