= Inversion (video game) =

2012 video game

- Developer: Saber Interactive
- Publisher: Namco Bandai Games
- Designer: Sergey Larionov
- Engine: Saber3D Engine
- Platforms: Microsoft Windows; PlayStation 3 Xbox 360
- Release: PlayStation 3 & Xbox 360: NA: June 5, 2012; AU: July 12, 2012; EU: July 13, 2012; Microsoft Windows: EU: June 8, 2012; AU: July 12, 2012; NA: July 26, 2012 (Steam)
- Genre: Third-person shooter
- Modes: Single-player, multiplayer

Inversion is a third-person shooter video game developed by Saber Interactive and published by Namco Bandai Games. It was released in June/July 2012 for Microsoft Windows, PlayStation 3 and Xbox 360. The game features gravity manipulation and destructible environments.

== Plot ==
In Vanguard City, policeman Davis Russell and his partner Leo Delgado are on duty when the city comes under attack by an army of strange barbaric soldiers called Lutadores armed with gravity-defying technology. As the ground is shaking in the wake of the attack, Davis and Leo hurry to Davis' apartment to check on his wife Cara and his daughter Leila. Upon arrival, the duo find Cara wounded and Leila missing. Cara dies of her injuries and Davis and Leo are soon captured by the Lutadores, who have taken control of the city.

Davis and Leo are taken to a prison camp and forced by the Lutadores to dig in a tunnel system, Davis only getting by on the hope that his daughter is still alive. A month into their imprisonment, they meet a man named Fitzgerald who claims he belongs to a resistance movement fighting the Lutadores. When questioned about Leila by Davis, Fitzgerald says that there are no children left in the city, all of them having been killed or taken prisoner. Davis and Leo are sent back into the tunnels, where they discover a hole leading out of the prison, but are then attacked by a giant robot and recaptured by the Lutadores. With Davis wounded from the fight with the robot, Fitzgerald distracts the guards to give him and Leo a chance to escape. The duo manage to make it out of the prison and back into the ruins of Vanguard City, now heavily occupied by Lutadore forces.

Returning to Davis' apartment in the hopes of picking up Leila's trail, Davis and Leo find nothing, but soon encounter a group of the resistance members Fitzgerald spoke of, led by a soldier named Banks. Banks explains that the Lutadores have a base at a site called Camp T'Kal, where they are keeping the captured children. Banks agrees to bring Davis and Leo along on their mission to attack Camp T'Kal if they can help uncover its location. Davis and Leo infiltrate a Lutadore command center, where they question the commander, who tells them the location of Camp T'Kal.

Making their way through the city to Camp T'Kal with Banks' forces, Davis and Leo are forced to proceed alone when Banks leaves to take an escaped child back. The duo proceed deeper into the base, finding an extremely high-tech complex underground. Davis and Leo soon reach an observation room revealing that Vanguard City is not on a planet, but inside one of several giant domes connected to the massive spaceship they have wandered into. Shocked and confused, Leo begins to lose hope but is convinced by Davis to keep pushing through to find Leila. The two continue on, finding themselves in a ruined lava-filled city resembling Vanguard, and conclude that it is the dome from which the Lutadores originate. Davis and Leo manage to locate the vehicle transporting the captured children and eventually catch up to the prisoners but fail to find Leila among them and are then captured by the Lutadores.

As the Lutadore leader, Kiltehr, prepares to execute Davis and Leo, the Lutadore is stormed by Banks and his men. Davis and Leo pursue Kiltehr into the core of the spaceship, the Inversion. Kiltehr, who has now taken control of the ship, sends Lutadores and the same type of robot that Davis and Leo encountered in the tunnels, to stop them. Davis and Leo soon confront Kiltehr in the ship's engine room, where he begins its self-destruct sequence. Overpowering Kiltehr, Davis grabs the control key from Kiltehr to stop the self-destruct, throwing it to Leo just as Kiltehr attacks him, knocking Davis and himself down a pit. Leo manages to stop the self-destruct just in time, and with their leader dead the Lutadores surrender, allowing the remaining people of Vanguard to begin rebuilding. Although Vanguard City's true nature as a part of the Inversion has been revealed, it is still unknown who built the ship and where it is going. Leo mentions that Davis was never found, and it is revealed that Leo found Leila's dead body when he and Davis returned to the apartment after escaping the prison, but did not have the heart to tell him, fearing this would break Davis completely.

In a post-credits sequence, Davis is shown climbing back up the pit that he and Kiltehr fell into.

== Reception ==
Reception

Aggregate score
Aggregator	Score
Metacritic	(PS3) 56/100 (X360) 53/100 (PC) 59/100

Review scores
Publication	Score
Destructoid	5/10
Edge	6/10
Electronic Gaming Monthly	7.5/10
Game Informer	6/10
GameRevolution	3/5
GameSpot	4/10
GameTrailers	5.8/10
IGN	5.5/10
Joystiq	2/5
Official Xbox Magazine (US)	6/10
PC Gamer (UK)	52%
PlayStation: The Official Magazine	7/10
Digital Spy	3/5
The Guardian	3/5

Upon release, Inversion received "mixed" reviews on all platforms according to the review aggregation website Metacritic.

The Digital Fix gave the PlayStation 3 version a score of six out of ten and called it "a solidly unspectacular shooter". Digital Spy also gave the same console version three stars out of five and called it "a game that feels instantly familiar, and not in a good way. The game lifts heavily from more illustrious sources, while its own unique selling point, gravity powers, never feels fully exploited. But equally, the game is a solid and reasonably well-produced shooter that is fun to play, particularly with other people. As long as you don't expect a revolution, you will have a good time battling this particular alien invasion." The Guardian gave the Xbox 360 version a similar score of three stars out of five and said it was "a nicely crafted game with some good ideas, which nevertheless seems unwilling to claim an identity of its own. If you liked Gears of War, you'll enjoy playing it, but you might find its sheer familiarity a bit annoying. And if you like third-person shooters that don't require superhuman skills, you'll enjoy it, too. But if you're looking for something futuristic, cutting-edge and distinctive, keep on looking." However, Metro gave the same console version three out of ten and said, "Combat and storytelling are boring beyond belief, but what's worst about Inversion is that you can sense the far more interesting game it could've been just beneath the surface."
