= Economic history of Birmingham =

Birmingham in England has developed economically since Medieval times.

== Early metalwork ==
John Leland visited Birmingham in about 1538, and found many smiths manufacturing knives and nails among other products. By 1683, there were 202 forges in the town (mainly in the Digbeth and Deritend areas), and guns and brass goods were also being made. Metal was not made to any great extent in the town itself at this stage, but was mainly imported from Staffordshire and elsewhere in the West Midlands. Immigration to the city from the surrounding counties brought expansion of these industries. The population of the city increased from 5-7,000 in 1700 to nearly 24,000 in 1750, and by 1775 the population was about 40,000, making Birmingham the third largest town in the UK after London and Bristol. In 1791, Arthur Young described Birmingham as "the first manufacturing town in the world".

== Manufacturing ==
By 1759, a House of Commons committee heard that at least 20,000 people in Birmingham and the surrounding area were employed in the "toy trade", manufacturing buttons, buckles and other trinkets, with the trade being worth around £600,000 per annum (five-sixths of it for export). Matthew Boulton, in 1770, claimed that Birmingham's superiority as a manufacturing town was largely due to the "superactivity" of the people, and the "mechanical contrivances and extensive apparatus which we are possess'd of". The use of hand-operated machinery and division of labour (which might see a button pass through fifty hands in the course of manufacture) was commented on by many visitors to Birmingham. Children were often employed in this sort of labour, their work being made easier by machines.

In 1767, there were 35 gun-makers, and 27 manufacturers of other gun parts. The firm of Farmer and Galton supplied most of the weaponry to the Company of Merchants in Africa (i.e. the African slave trade). Pins, jewellery and papier-mâché were also produced in large quantities in the city, and goods of all sorts were exported to North America and Europe (Boulton, in the same year, claimed that half his correspondence was in German).

== Birmingham Canal ==
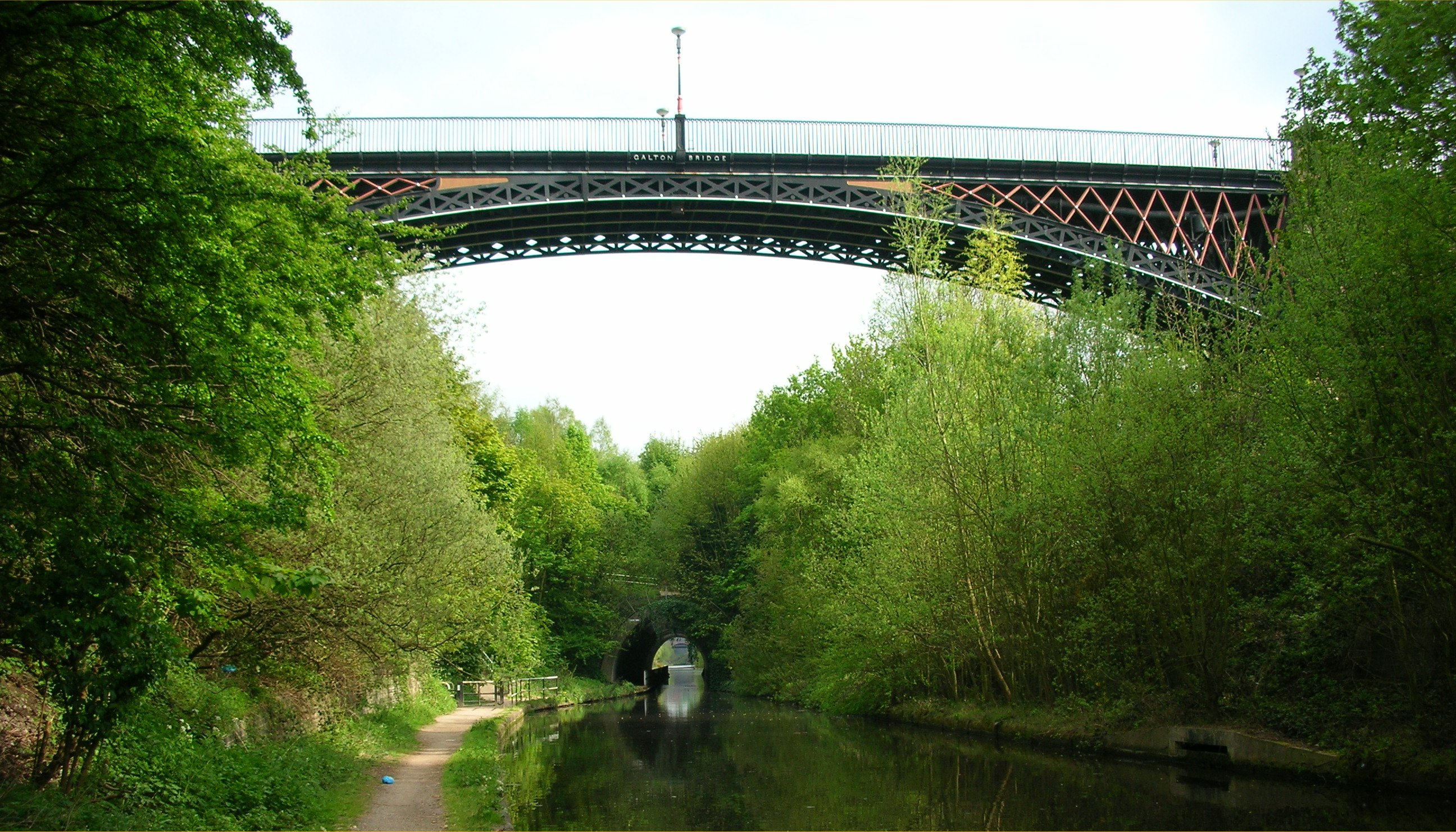
Galton Bridge and the modern Galton Tunnel

The first cargo was transported on the Birmingham Canal in 1770, and the canal greatly reduced the price of goods such as coal which had previously been transported by road. The canal system was extended throughout the late 18th and early 19th centuries.

== Banks ==
Expansion during this period was also aided by the establishment of several banks – the button manufacturer John Taylor and the ironmaster Sampson Lloyd III established what was later to become Lloyds Bank (and then Lloyds TSB) in 1765, opening a branch in London in 1770.

Despite the establishment of several large manufacturers (for example Boulton and Fothergill's famous works at Soho), most of the city's manufacturing was done in small family workshops. Payment was usually by piece-work, and workers could therefore decide when they wanted to work – it was usual for "Saint Monday" to be a day of rest in addition to the weekend, with long hours being worked later on to compensate, and employers had very little control over the working hours of their employees.

Aside from banks, there were other kinds of institution involved in the circulation of money in Birmingham before the modern era. For example, the Brewers Investment Corporation Ltd, with offices at Nos.3-4, County Chambers, Corporation Street, Birmingham. It became a public company by 1895 and was listed on the London Stock Exchange for that year.

== Water power ==
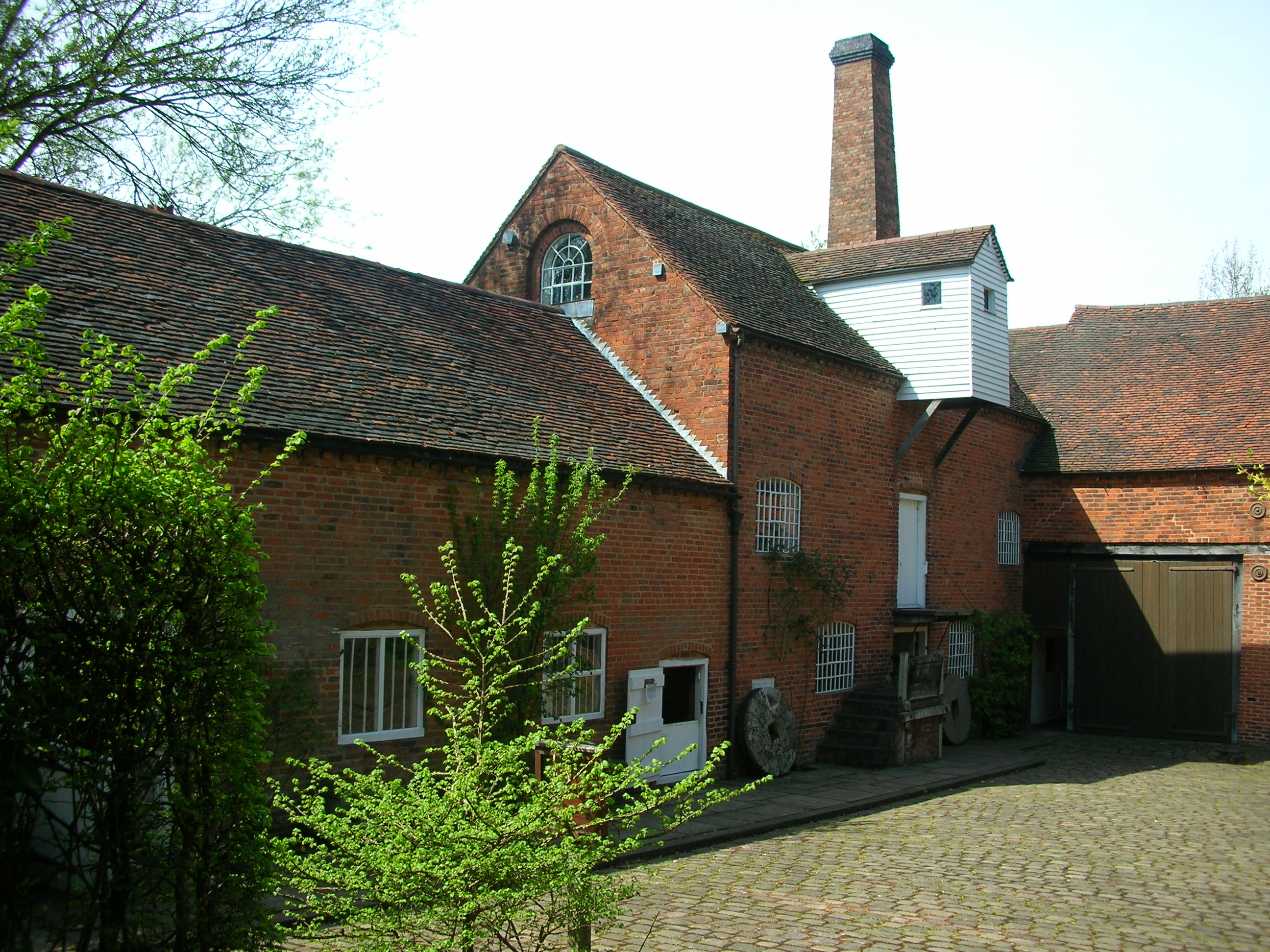
Sarehole Mill

As early as 1755, Sarehole Mill was leased by Matthew Boulton, one of the pioneers of the Industrial Revolution and leading figure of the Lunar Society, for scientific experimentation. It is believed he converted the machinery for use in metal working. As well as milling grain it has been used for grinding bones for fertiliser, sheet metal rolling (Matthew Boulton) and wire drawing.

== Steam power ==
The long-established industrial processes in the city meant that it was actually quite late in adopting the methods of the Industrial Revolution – manufacturing was so efficient and workshops so small that the steam engine, developed in Birmingham by Boulton and James Watt around 1770, did not find widespread use in the city for another sixty years (in 1815, there were only about forty steam engines in the town, many very small). However, steam power and improvements in iron manufacturing processes were important in the development of the nearby Black Country, which by the end of the 18th century supplied much of the metal needed by Birmingham's manufacturing industries.

== Invention ==
Numerous inventors emerged during Birmingham's past, and the city's skilled workforce and infrastructure encouraged other inventors and businessmen from across the world to set up shop in the city.
