= Edgbaston House =

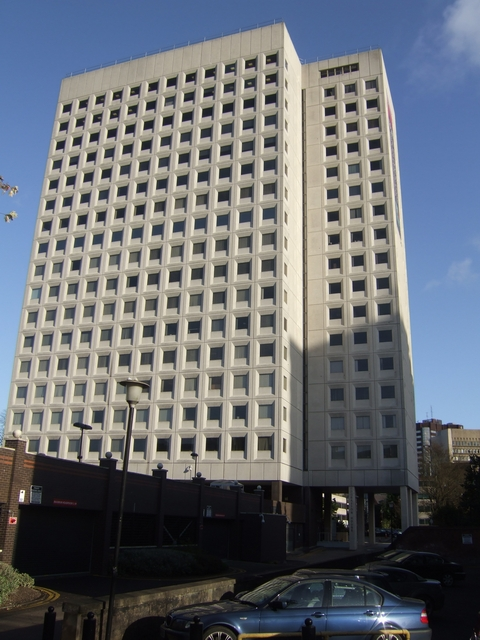
- Interactive map of the Edgbaston House area

General information
- Type: Commercial
- Location: Duchess Place, Birmingham, England
- Coordinates: 52°28′22.52″N 1°55′29.45″W
- Completed: 1976
- Demolished: 2018

Height
- Height: 69m (225 ft)

Technical details
- Floor count: 18

Edgbaston House was a highrise commercial building in Duchess Place, Birmingham. It was built by Laing Development Co Ltd. and the consulting engineers were Ove Arup. Construction cost £1,720,000. It was the result of work by Calthorpe Estates to attract businesses to the Hagley Road and Five Ways by promoting the construction of office blocks there. It is part of the Duchess Place estate which consists of office blocks totalling 200,000 sq ft (19,000 m^{2}). They are owned by the Kenmore Group, who acquired the estate from Chelsfield.

Prior to demolition tenants of the building included Al Rayan Bank and various medical groups. It was demolished in 2018 to be replaced by the New Garden Square development.

== See also ==
- List of tallest buildings and structures in Birmingham
