= Iceni =

Roman-era British tribe

Coordinates: 52.5°N 1.0°E

Geography
- Capital: Venta Icenorum (Caistor St Edmund)
- Location: Norfolk; Suffolk; East Suffolk, Mid Suffolk. West Suffolk; Lincolnshire Fens; South Holland; Cambridgeshire Fens; Fenland, East Cambridgeshire (aka The Fens)
- Rulers: Canduro[...]; Aesu[...]; Saemu[...]; Antedi[...]; Prasutagus; Boudica

The Iceni (/aɪˈsiːnaɪ/ eye-SEEN-eye, Classical Latin: [ɪˈkeːniː]) or Eceni were an ancient tribe of eastern Britain during the Iron Age and early Roman era. Their territory included present-day Norfolk and parts of Cambridgeshire, Lincolnshire, and Suffolk; it bordered the area of the Corieltauvi to the west, and the Catuvellauni and Trinovantes to the south. In the Roman period, their capital was Venta Icenorum at modern-day Caistor St Edmund.

Julius Caesar does not mention the Iceni in his account of his invasions of Britain in 55 and 54 BC, though they may be related to the Cenimagni, whom Caesar notes as living north of the River Thames at that time. The Iceni were a significant power in eastern Britain during Claudius' conquest of Britain in AD 43, following which they allied with Rome. Increasing Roman influence on their affairs led to a revolt in AD 47, though they remained nominally independent under king Prasutagus until his death around AD 60. Roman encroachment after Prasutagus' death led his wife Boudica to launch a major revolt from 60–61. Boudica's uprising seriously endangered Roman rule in Britain and resulted in the burning of Londinium and other cities. The Romans finally crushed the rebellion, and the Iceni were increasingly incorporated into the Roman province.

== Name ==
The meaning of the name Iceni (Latin: Icēnī) is uncertain and modern suggestions are speculative.

Icenian coins dating from the 1st century AD use the spelling ECEN: an article by D. F. Allen titled "The Coins of the Iceni", discusses the difference between coins with the inscription ECE versus coins with ECEN. This difference, Allen posits, tells archaeologists and historians when Prasutagus started his reign because the coins did not start reading the name of the tribe until around AD 47. Allen suggests that when Antedios was king of the Iceni, the coins did not yet have the name of the tribe on them but instead the name of its ruler, stating, "If so, the coins suggest that the Prasutagus era commenced only after the events of 47".

The word echen in Welsh as given by the Owen-Pughe etymological dictionary of 1832, means origin or source; a tribe. The current Dictionary of the Welsh Language defines echen as "stock, lineage, family, tribe, source, origin, nature", cognate with Cornish eghen.

In his 1658 treatise Hydriotaphia, Urn Burial, the English polymath Sir Thomas Browne suggests that "Iken" was the old name for the River Ouse, where the Iceni were said to have originated and from which they might have derived their name. (Note: He writes, "A note in Wilkin adds 'But, unfortunately, iken does not signify an elbow: and it appears that the Iceni derived their name from the river Ouse, on whose banks they resided, — anciently called Iken, Yken, or Ycin. Whence also, Ikenild-street, Ikenthorpe, Ikenworth.' Unfortunately Wilkin gives no source for this information. The note also begs the question, as we are still left asking why the river is the Iken (though the origins of river names are notoriously difficult, they are still often traceable with work).") Robert Henry (1771) refers to a suggested naming from the Brittonic word ychen meaning oxen. Ych (s.) and Ychen (pl.) are still used in modern Welsh. The final '-i' is a Latin nominative plural case ending added to the two-syllable tribal name.

== Archaeology ==
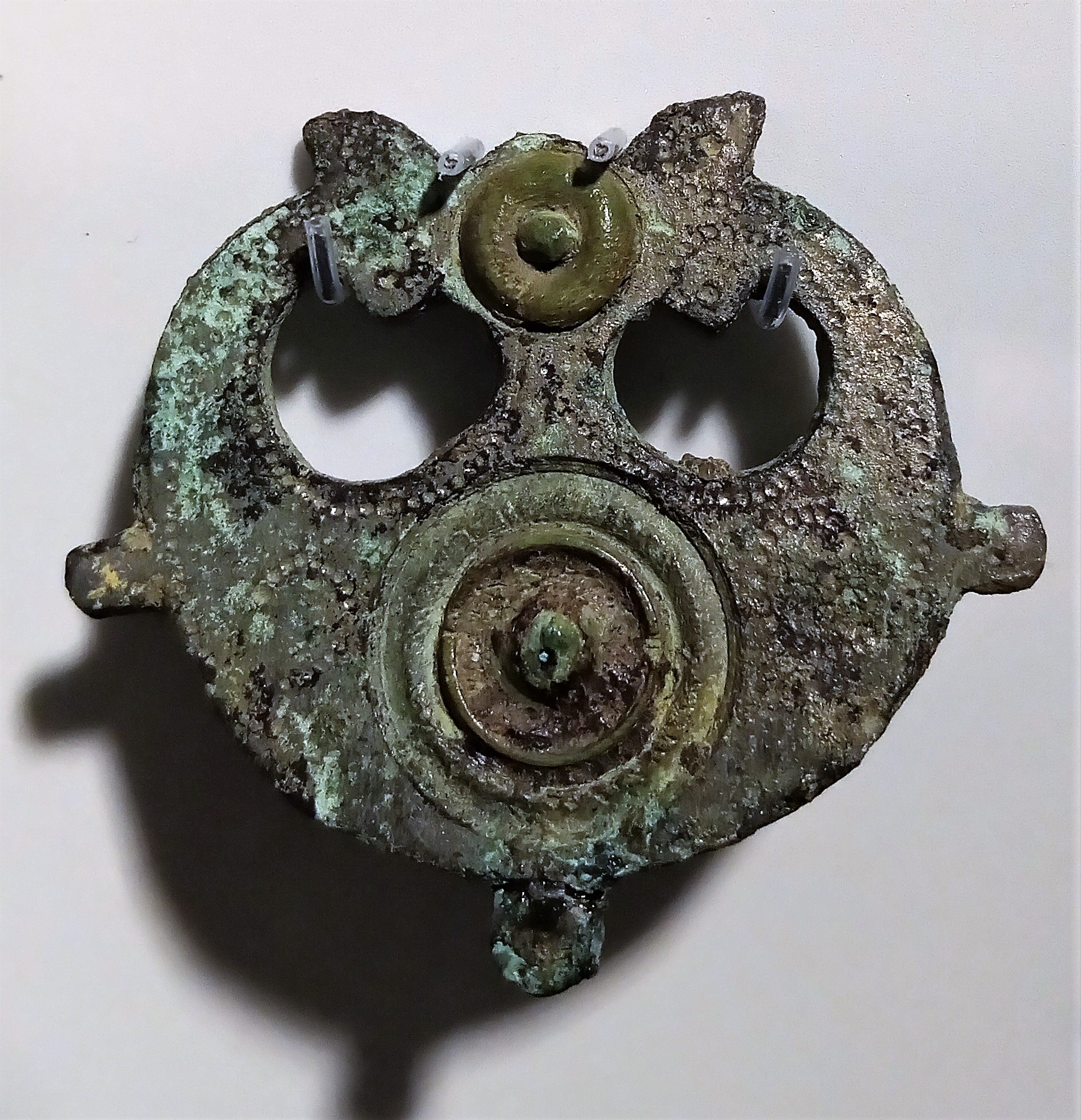
Iceni plate brooch found at Caistor St Edmund (Norfolk Museums Collections)

Archaeological evidence of the Iceni includes torcs — heavy rings of gold, silver or electrum worn around the neck and shoulders. The Iceni began producing coins around 10 BC. Their coins were a distinctive adaptation of the Gallo-Belgic "face/horse" design, and in some early issues, most numerous near Norwich, the horse was replaced with a boar. Some coins are inscribed ECENI, making them the only coin-producing group to use their tribal name on coins. The earliest personal name to appear on coins is Antedios (about 10 BC), and other abbreviated names like AESU and SAEMU follow.

It has been discovered that the name of Antedios’ succeeding ruler Prasutagus appears on the coins as well. H. R. Mossop in his article “An Elusive Icenian Legend” discusses coins that were discovered by D. F. Allen in Joist Fen, Suffolk, and states, “It is the coins Nos. 6 and 7 which give an advance in the obverse reading, confirming Allen’s attractive reading PRASTO, with its implied allusion to Prasutagus”.

Sir Thomas Browne, the first English archaeological writer, wrote in 1658 of the Roman occupation, Boudica and Iceni coins:

That Britain was notably populous is undeniable, from that expression of Caesar. That the Romans themselves were early in no small Numbers, Seventy Thousand with their associates slain by Bouadicea, affords a sure account... And no small number of silver pieces near Norwich; with a rude head upon the obverse, an ill-formed horse on the reverse, with the Inscriptions Ic. Duro.T. whether implying Iceni, Durotriges, Tascia, or Trinobantes, we leave to higher conjecture. The British Coyns afford conjecture of early habitation in these parts, though the city of Norwich arose from the ruins of Venta, and though perhaps not without some habitation before, was enlarged, built, and nominated by the Saxons.

The Icknield Way, an ancient trackway linking East Anglia to the Chilterns, may be named after the Iceni.

John A. Davies and Tony Gregory conducted archaeological surveys of Roman coins that appeared during the period of Roman occupation of Norfolk. Their study showed that the bulk of the coins circulating before AD 60 was Icenian rather than Roman. They speculated that Roman coins were not adapted into the Iceni area until after AD 60. The coin study also showed that there was not a regular supply of Roman coinage from year to year:

The predominance of specific issues at sites across the province and relative scarcity of coins of some emperors illustrates the point that supply was sporadic and that there were periods when little or no fresh coinage was sent to Britain from the imperial mints.

In certain rural regions of Norfolk, Davies and Gregory speculate that the Iceni farmers were impacted very little by the civitas, seeing as there is a scarce presence of coinage and treasures. On the other hand, their surveys found "coin-rich temple sites, which appear to have served as centres for periodic fairs and festivals and provided locations for markets and commercial transactions within their complexes and environs. In such rural areas, producers and consumers would have been attracted to these sites for commerce from afield"

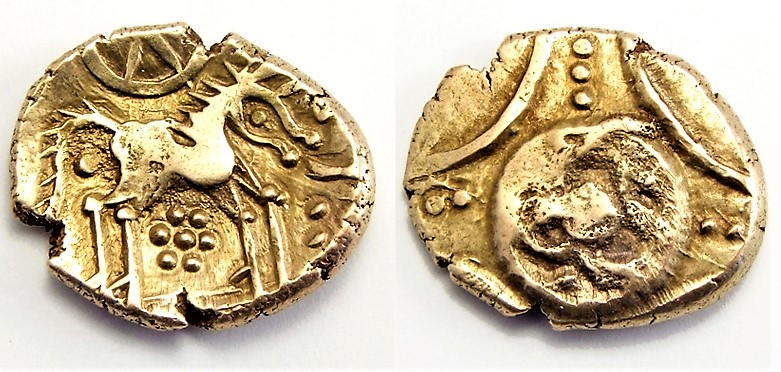
Gold stater (15 BC - 20 AD). (right) horse (left) flower

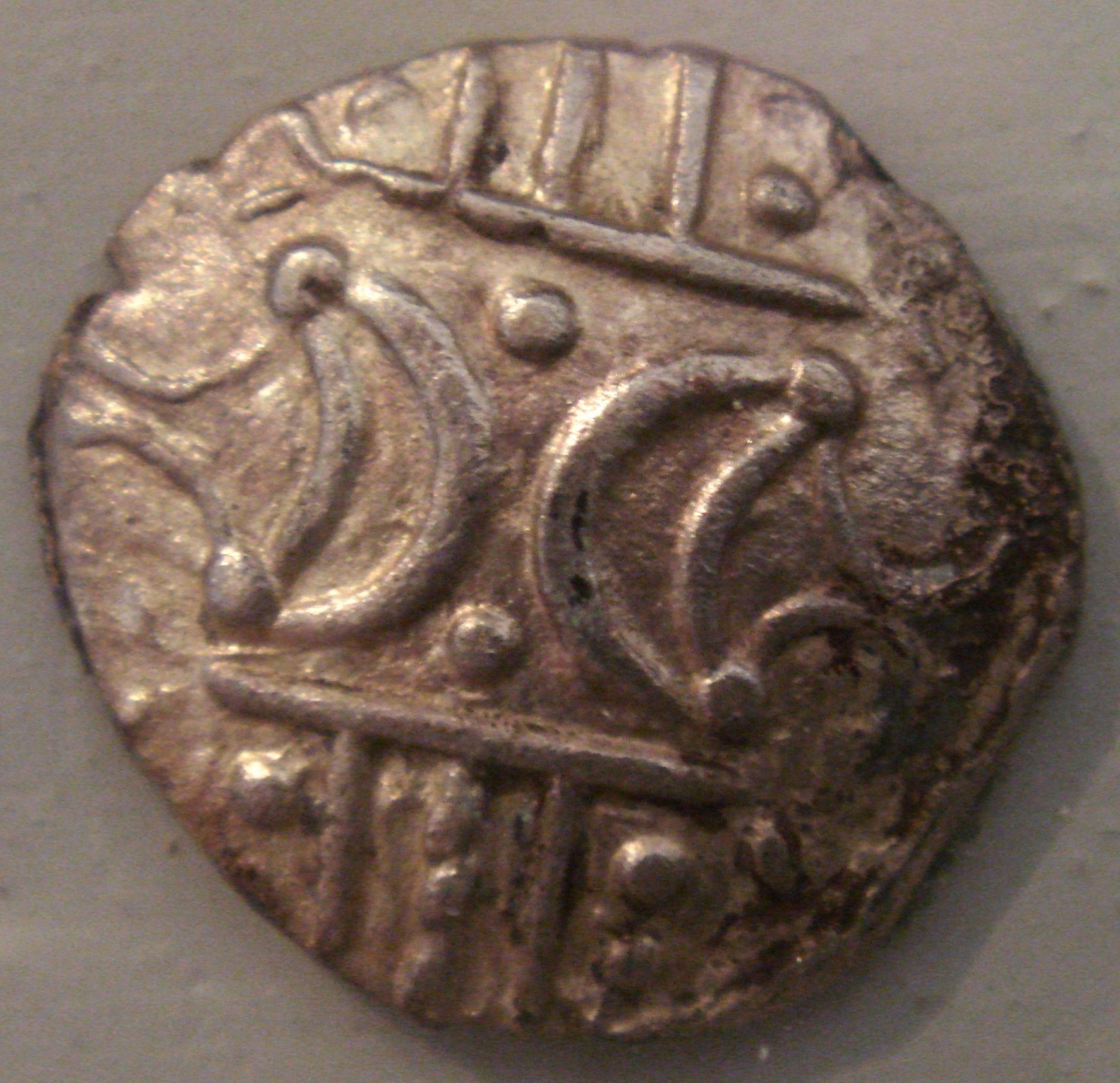
Iceni coin

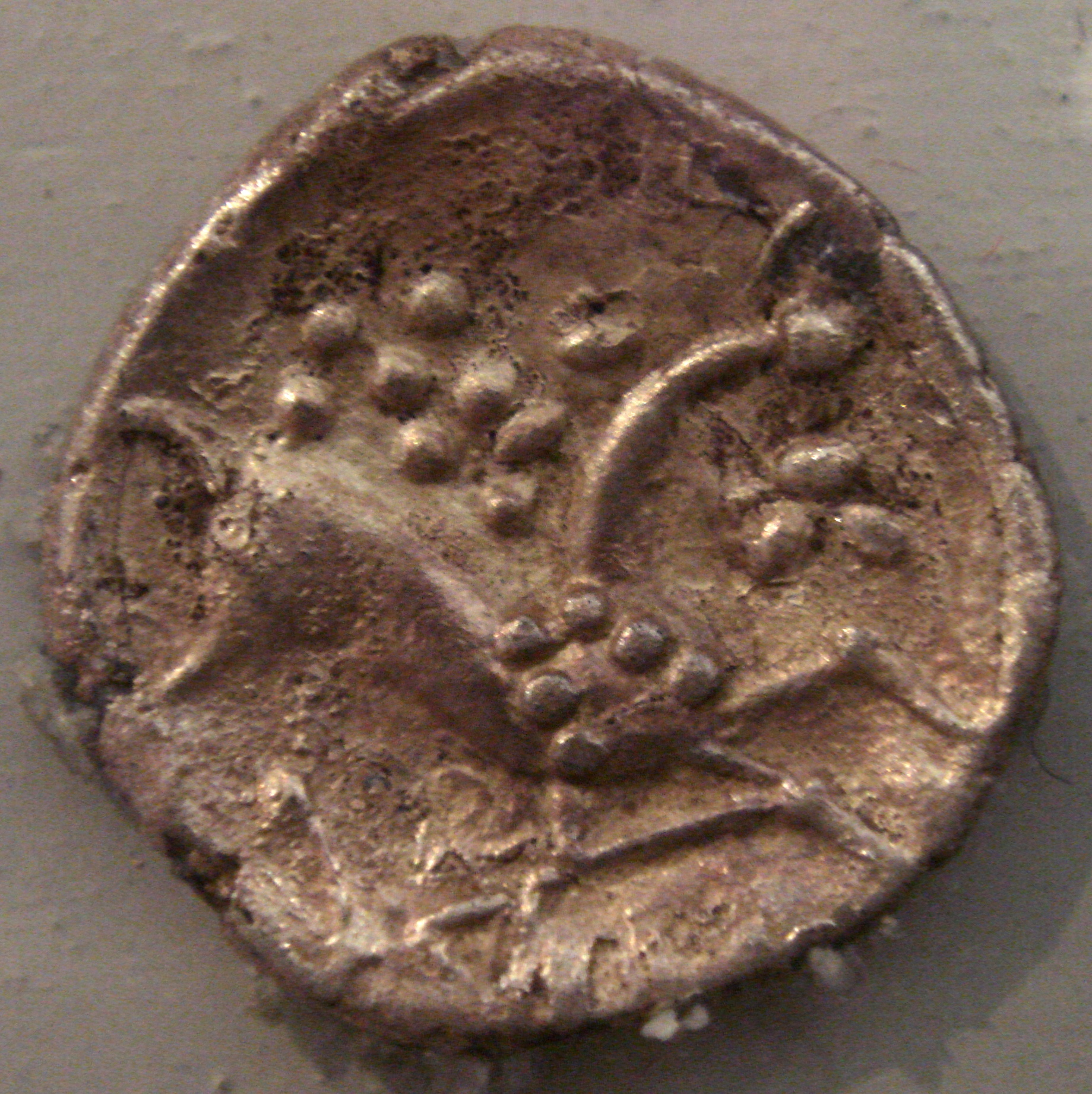
Iceni coin (reverse)

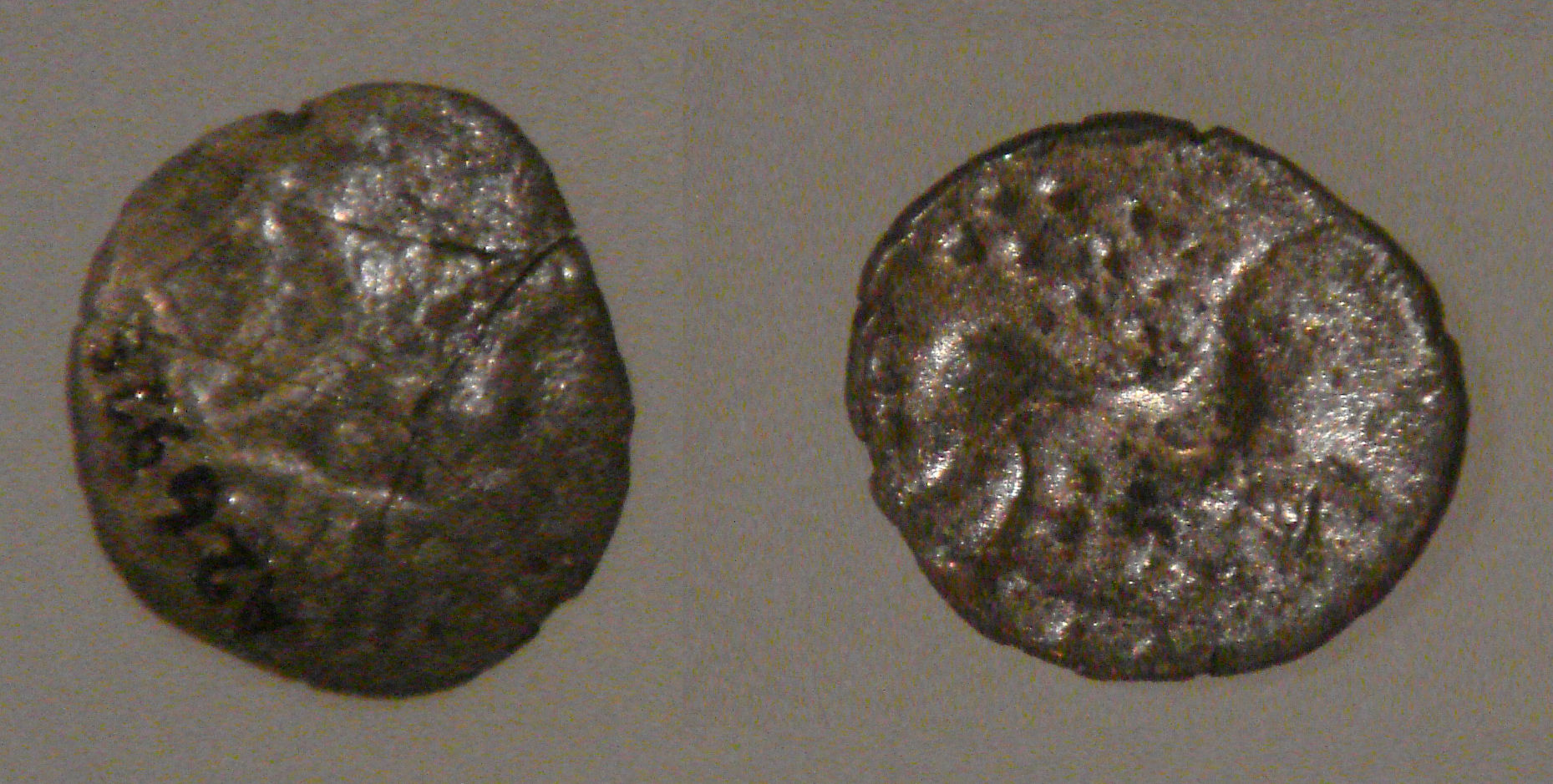
Bronze coins of the Iceni. Museum of London.

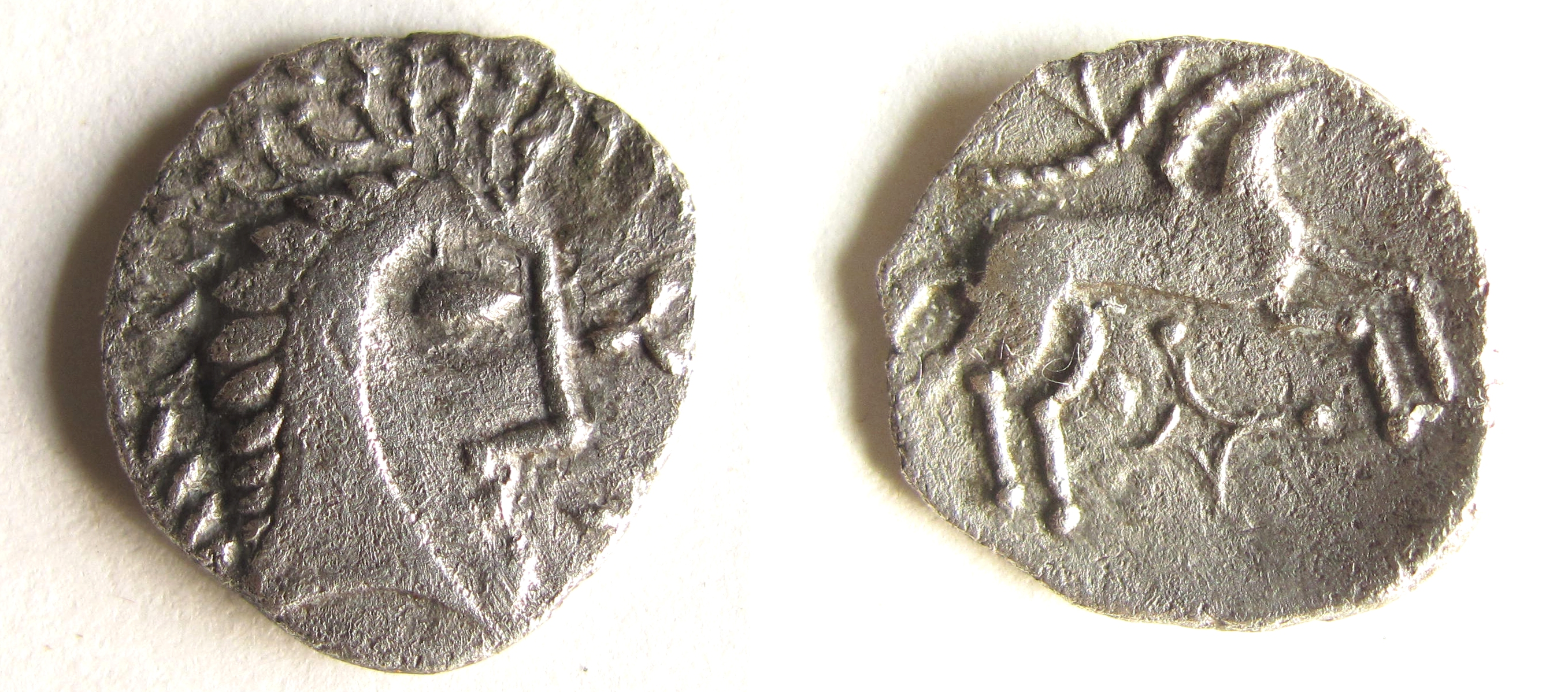
Icenian silver coin, found in Norfolk.

At the Norwich Castle Museum, a dedicated gallery includes a reproduction of an Iceni chariot.

== Roman invasion ==
Tacitus records that the Iceni were not conquered in the Claudian invasion of AD 43. It is uncertain whether the Iceni formed part of the British resistance. The war against the Roman landings was led by the Catuvellauni who had themselves not long subdued the Iceni's southern neighbours Trinovantes; history does not record whether the Iceni viewed the Romans as a dangerous threat, or perhaps as a welcome counterweight to Catuvellauni expansion. It is likely that the Iceni were among the 'eleven kings' who surrendered to Claudius at Camulodunum. At that point, the Iceni retained independence as a client kingdom.

In 47 the Iceni rebelled after the governor, Publius Ostorius Scapula, ordered them and other British client kingdoms to disarm. The Iceni were defeated by Ostorius in a fierce battle at a fortified place, the most obvious known candidate for this battle being at Stonea Camp in Cambridgeshire. Nonetheless, the Iceni were allowed to retain their independence.

A second and more serious uprising, the Boudican revolt, took place in AD 61. Prasutagus, the wealthy, pro-Roman Icenian king, who, according to a section in the Oxford Dictionary of National Biography titled "Roman Britain, British Leaders", was leader of the Iceni between AD 43 and 50 (Todd 4), had died. It was common practice for a Roman client king to leave his kingdom to Rome on his death, but Prasutagus had attempted to preserve his line by bequeathing his kingdom — which Allen believes was located in Breckland, near Norwich — jointly to the Emperor and his own daughters. The Romans ignored this, and the procurator Catus Decianus seized his entire estate. Prasutagus's widow, Boudica, was flogged, and her daughters were raped. At the same time, Roman financiers called in their loans. While the governor, Gaius Suetonius Paulinus, was campaigning in Wales, Boudica led the Iceni and the neighbouring Trinovantes in a large-scale revolt:

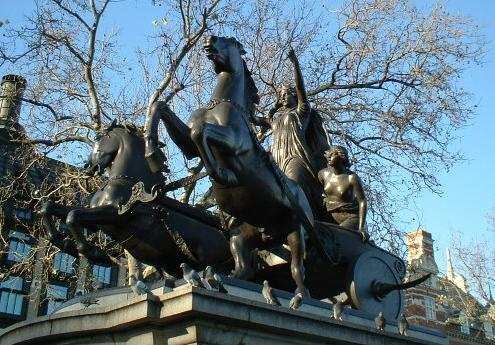
Boadicea and Her Daughters by Thomas Thornycroft

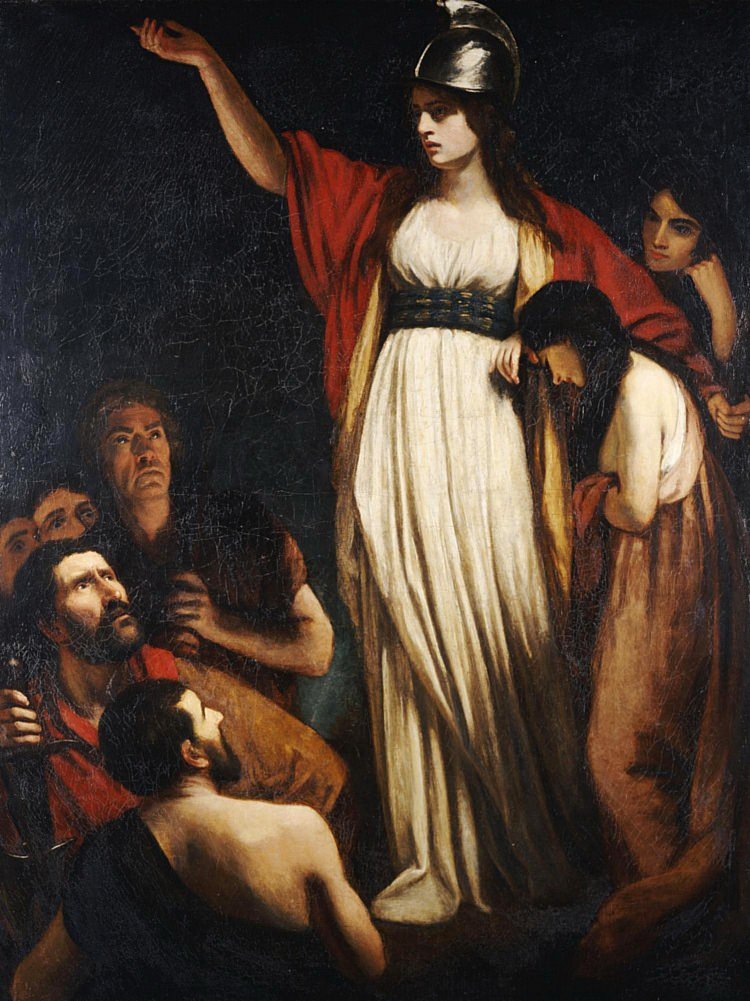
Painting of Boadicea Haranguing the Britons by John Opie, R.A. (1761-1807). Oil On Canvas.

...a terrible disaster occurred in Britain. Two cities were sacked, eighty thousand of the Romans and of their allies perished, and the island was lost to Rome. Moreover, all this ruin was brought upon the Romans by a woman, a fact which in itself caused them the greatest shame.... But the person who was chiefly instrumental in rousing the natives and persuading them to fight the Romans, the person who was thought worthy to be their leader and who directed the conduct of the entire war, was Buduica, a Briton woman of the royal family and possessed of greater intelligence than often belongs to women.... In stature she was very tall, in appearance most terrifying, in the glance of her eye most fierce, and her voice was harsh; a great mass of the tawniest hair fell to her hips; around her neck was a large golden necklace; and she wore a tunic of divers colours over which a thick mantle was fastened with a brooch. This was her invariable attire.

The revolt caused the destruction and looting of Camulodunum (Colchester), Londinium (London), and Verulamium (St Albans) before finally being defeated by Suetonius Paulinus and his legions. Although the Britons outnumbered the Romans greatly, they lacked the superior discipline and tactics that won the Romans a decisive victory. The battle took place at an unknown location, possibly somewhere along Watling Street. Today, a large statue of Boudica wielding a sword and charging upon a chariot, called "Boadicea and Her Daughters", can be seen in London on the north bank of the Thames by Westminster Bridge.

== After the revolt ==
The fate of the Iceni immediately after the rebellion is not clearly recorded. The rebellious Britons were subjected to harsh retaliatory measures by Suetonius Paulinus, until he was recalled and replaced by a governor with a more conciliatory approach. Further, Roman historians note that the British had neglected their fields and crops, leading to famine.

Ptolemy's Geographia, at section 2,3,21, names people called Σιμενοι in the original Greek, but usually thought to be a copying error for Ικενοι (Icenoi), as having a town called Venta. Venta Icenorum may have been the civitas capital of the Iceni following the rebellion. Venta, also mentioned in the Ravenna Cosmography, and the Antonine Itinerary, was a settlement near the village of Caistor St Edmund, some 8 kilometres (5 mi) south of present-day Norwich, and about 2 kilometres (1.5 mi) from the Bronze Age Henge at Arminghall.

== Post-Roman period ==
Ken Dark suggests that there was a period of depopulation of the homelands of the Iceni during the fourth century. This was quickly followed by the settlement of Germanic speakers from the continent, beginning at the start of the fifth century. Toby Martin has identified the region as one in which a mass migration of these incomers likely occurred; there are particularly few Celtic toponyms in most of East Anglia.

Suggestions have been made that the descendants of the Iceni survived longer in the Fens. In the Life of Saint Guthlac – a biography of the Anglian hermit who lived in the Fenland during the early 8th century – it is stated that Saint Guthlac was attacked on several occasions by demons who spoke Brittonic languages living in the Fens at that time. Bertram Colgrave and Lindy Brady have argued that this passage cannot be taken literally, as these "Britons" seem to have been intended to represent figments of Guthlac's imagination rather than real people. However, several place names do suggest a longer British presence in the region. These include Chatteris, Chettisham, Crowland, Ely, Funthams Lane, Holland, Lutton, and King's Lynn, (Note: formerly Bishop's Lynn) all of which contain possible or probable Brittonic or British Latin elements. A number of lost toponyms (such as Bretlond and Walecroft) also suggest land held by Britons well into the Anglo-Saxon era.

== Fiction ==
- Scott, Manda (2003–2006). Boudica series.
- Henty, George (1893). Beric of Britain: A story of the Roman Invasion. London.

== Bibliography ==
- Allen, D. F. (1970). "The Coins of the Iceni". Britannia. 1: 1–33. doi:10.2307/525832. JSTOR 525832.
- Browne, Thomas (1658). "Hydriotaphia: Chapter II" – via uchicago.edu.
- Bunson, Matthew (1994). "Britannia". Encyclopedia of the Roman Empire. New York: Facts on File.
- Bunson, Matthew (2012). Encyclopedia of Ancient Rome. Facts On File. ISBN 978-0-8160-8217-9.
- “Britain, Roman.” The Oxford Classical Dictionary. 4th ed. Oxford: Oxford UP, 2012. Print.
- Davies, John. A., Gregory, Tony. "Coinage from a 'Civitas': A Survey of the Roman Coins Found in Norfolk and their Contribution to the Archaeology of the 'Civitas Icenorum'" "Britannia" (1991): 65-101. Web. 12 March 2013.
- Dio, Cassius. Roman History Cambridge: Harvard UP, 1987. Print.
- Gardiner, Juliet, and Neil Wenborn. “Civitas.” The Columbia Companion to British History. New York: Columbia UP, 1997. Print.
- Mossop, H. R.; Allen, D. F. (1979). "An Elusive Icenian Legend". Britannia. 10: 258–259. doi:10.2307/526062. JSTOR 526062.
- Ó Faoláin, Simon (2006). "Iceni". In Koch, John T. (ed.). Celtic Culture: A Historical Encyclopedia. ABC-CLIO. pp. 954–955. ISBN 1851094407.
- Snyder, Christopher A. (2003). The Britons. Blackwell Publishing. pp. 34–36, 40–42. ISBN 0-631-22260-X.
- Williamson, Tom. The Origins of Norfolk. Manchester University Press: 1993.
