= Prasutagus =

1st-century AD British Iceni king

Prasutagua

King of the Iceni
- Reign: ? - 60 AD
- Successor: Boudica
- Born: c. 1st century AD
- Died: c. 60 AD; Roman Britain, Roman Empire
- Consort: Boudica
- Issue: 2 daughters
- Religion: Ancient Celtic religion

Prasutagus (died AD 60 or 61) was king of the Iceni, a British Celtic tribe, who, in the 1st century AD, inhabited roughly what is now Norfolk. He is best known as the husband of Boudica.

Prasutagus may have been one of the eleven kings who surrendered to Claudius following the Roman conquest in 43, or he may have been installed as king following the defeat of a rebellion of the Iceni in 47. As an ally of Rome his tribe were allowed to remain nominally independent, albeit disarmed, and to ensure this Prasutagus named the Roman emperor as co-heir to his kingdom, along with his two daughters. Tacitus says he lived a long and prosperous life, but when he died, the Romans ignored his will and took over, depriving the nobles of their lands and plundering the kingdom. Boudica was flogged and their daughters raped. Roman financiers called in their loans. All this led to the revolt of the Iceni, under the leadership of Boudica, in 60 or 61.

Coins have been found in Suffolk inscribed SVB ESVPRASTO ESICO FECIT, "under Esuprastus Esico made (this)" in Latin. Some archaeologists believe that Esuprastus was the true name of the king Tacitus calls Prasutagus, while others think he was a different person. Others interpret Esuprastus is a compound name, with "Esu-" deriving from the god Esus and meaning "lord", "master" or "honour", and "Prasto-" being an abbreviated personal name, the coin inscription thus meaning "under Lord Prasto-". It is also notable that coins of the Corieltauvi have been found inscribed with the similar names IISVPRASV and ESVPASV. The name of an earlier king of the Iceni appears on coins as SCAVO, a name which may be related to the Latin scaeva, "left", and scaevola, "left-handed". Both rulers' coins are similarly Roman in style and language and were probably issued within twenty years of each other. Chris Rudd suggests that Esuprastus, whom he identifies with Prasutagus, succeeded Scavo after the Icenian rebellion of 47.

Icenian coins dating from the 1st century AD use the spelling ECEN rather than ECE: It has been argued that this change coincides with the start of Prasutagus's reign, with the coins of Antedios showing only the name of the ruler rather than the tribe. "If so, the coins suggest that the Prasutagus era commenced only after the events of 47".
