= Thornycroft (disambiguation) =

Thornycroft, Thorneycroft, or Thornicroft may refer to:

== Thornycroft family ==
Thornycroft family, British arts and industry family

- Thomas Thornycroft (1815–85), sculptor
- his wife Mary Thornycroft (1814–95), sculptor
  - John Isaac Thornycroft (1843–1928), son of Thomas, marine engineer
    - John Edward Thornycroft (1872–1960), son of John Isaac, mechanical and civil engineer
    - Blanche Coules Thornycroft (1873–1950), daughter of John Isaac, naval architect and marine engineer
    - Isaac Thomas Thornycroft (1881–1955), son of John Isaac, motorboat and yacht racer, 1908 Olympic gold medalist in motor boating
  - Alyce Thornycroft (1844–1906), daughter of Thomas, painter
  - Helen Thornycroft (1848–1937), daughter of Thomas, painter
  - Hamo Thornycroft RA (1850–1925), son of Thomas, sculptor
  - Theresa Thornycroft (1853–1947), daughter of Thomas, sculptor, mother of Siegfried Sassoon

== Other people ==
- Alexander Thorneycroft (1859–1931), British Army general
- Carla Thorneycroft, Baroness Thorneycroft (1914–2007), British patron of the arts
- Charles Thorneycroft (1879–1972), English cricketer
- Craig Thornicroft, former drummer for dance-punk band Youves
- Diana Thorneycroft (born 1956), Canadian artist
- Elizabeth Thornicroft (fl. 1723), wife of George Nevill, 14th Baron Bergavenny
- Gaston Thornicroft (fl.1930s–1960s), businessman and Coloured activist in Southern Rhodesia
- George Benjamin Thorneycroft (1791–1851), ironmaster and Tory supporter who became the first Mayor of Wolverhampton, after the Borough was incorporated, in 1848
- Harry Scott Thornicroft (fl.1900s–1930s), colonial administrator in Northern Rhodesia
- Harry Thorneycroft (1892–1956) British Labour politician
- John Thornicroft, conductor of the Regina Symphony Orchestra 1955–1958
- Nick Thornicroft (born 1985), English cricketer
- Micheen Thornycroft (born 1987), Zimbabwean rower
- Peter Thorneycroft, Baron Thorneycroft (1909–1994), British Conservative politician
- Wallace Thorneycroft (1864–1954), mining engineer and geologist

== Companies ==
- Thornycroft, vehicle manufacturer separated from the shipbuilding company in the early 20th century
- John I. Thornycroft & Company, shipbuilder started by John Isaac Thornycroft, subsequently VT Group

== Football clubs ==
- Thornycroft Athletic F.C., in Basingstoke, founded by employees of the vehicle manufacturer
- Thornycrofts (Woolston) F.C., in Woolston, Southampton, founded by employees of the shipbuilder
- Vosper Thornycroft F.C., in Sholing, Southampton now known as Sholing F.C.

== Other ==
- Thorneycroft carbine, 1901 bullpup design rifle
