= Boadicea and Her Daughters =

Sculptural group in Westminster, London

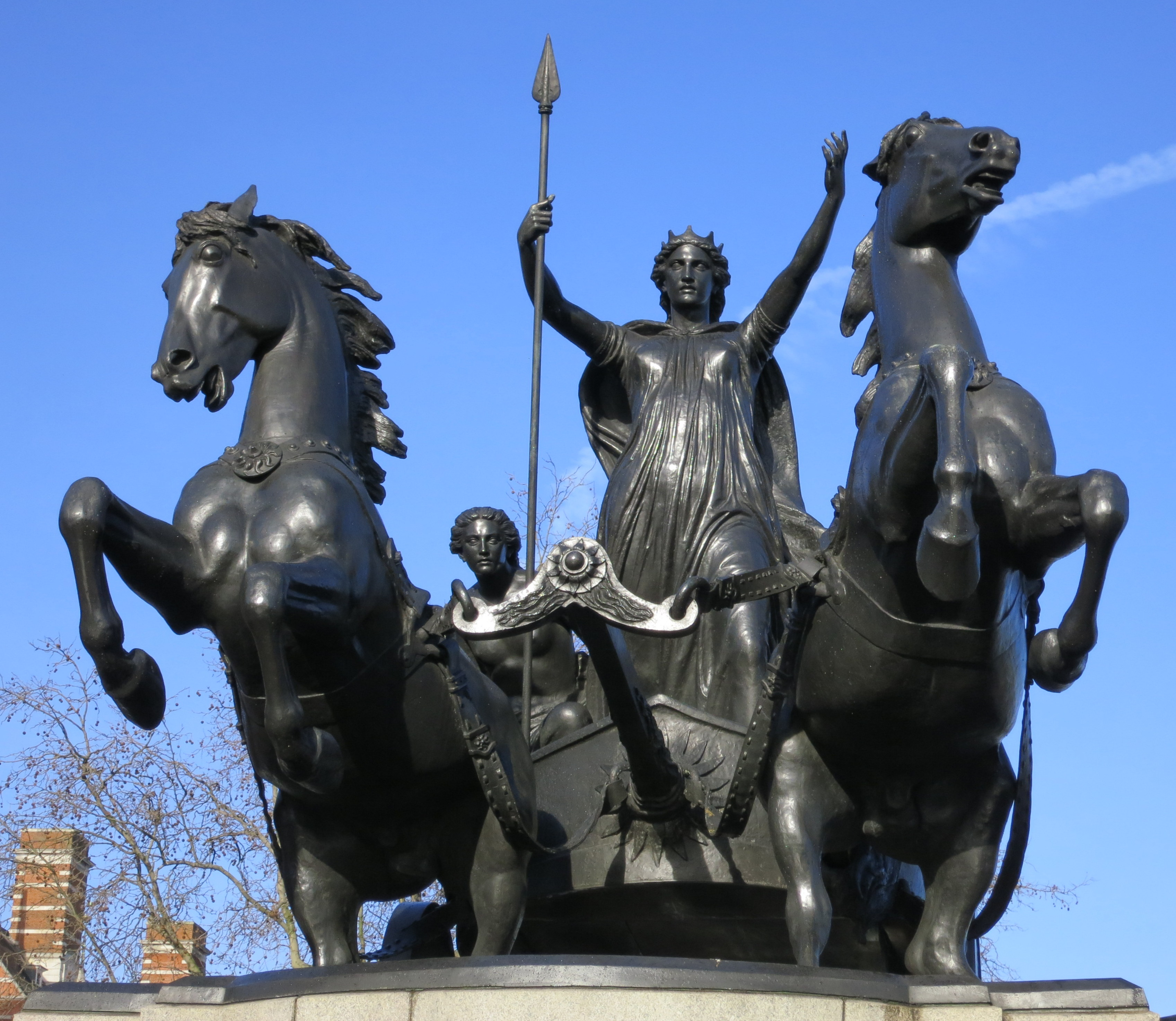
- The sculptural group in 2013
- Artist: Thomas Thornycroft
- Year: 1856–1883 (executed); June 1902 (erected)
- Type: Sculptural group
- Medium: Bronze
- Subject: Boudica
- Location: London, SW1 United Kingdom; 51°30′04″N 0°07′26″W

Listed Building – Grade II
- Official name: Boadicea (Boudicca) statuary group
- Designated: 24 February 1958
- Reference no.: 1237737

Boadicea and Her Daughters is a bronze sculptural group in London representing Boudica, queen of the Celtic Iceni tribe, who led an uprising in Roman Britain. It is located to the north side of the western end of Westminster Bridge, near Portcullis House and Westminster Pier, facing Big Ben and the Palace of Westminster across the road. It is considered the magnum opus of its sculptor, the English artist and engineer Thomas Thornycroft. Thornycroft worked on it from 1856 until shortly before his death in 1885, sometimes assisted by his son William Hamo Thornycroft. The group was finished by the professional sculptress Mary Thornycroft, Thomas his wife, but it was not erected in its current position until 1902. It became a rallypoint for the women's suffrage movement.

== Design ==
The statue portrays Boudica (commonly written as "Boadicea" in the Victorian era), Queen of the Iceni tribe of Britons, accompanied by her two daughters, mounted on a scythed chariot drawn by two rearing horses. The chariot is based on Roman models, not native British or Iceni models, and has a scythe blade attached to each wheel. The queen stands upright, in a flowing gown, with a spear in her right hand and her left hand raised. Her daughters, with bared breasts, crouch in the chariot, one to either side of their mother. None of them holds reins to control the horses.

== Construction ==
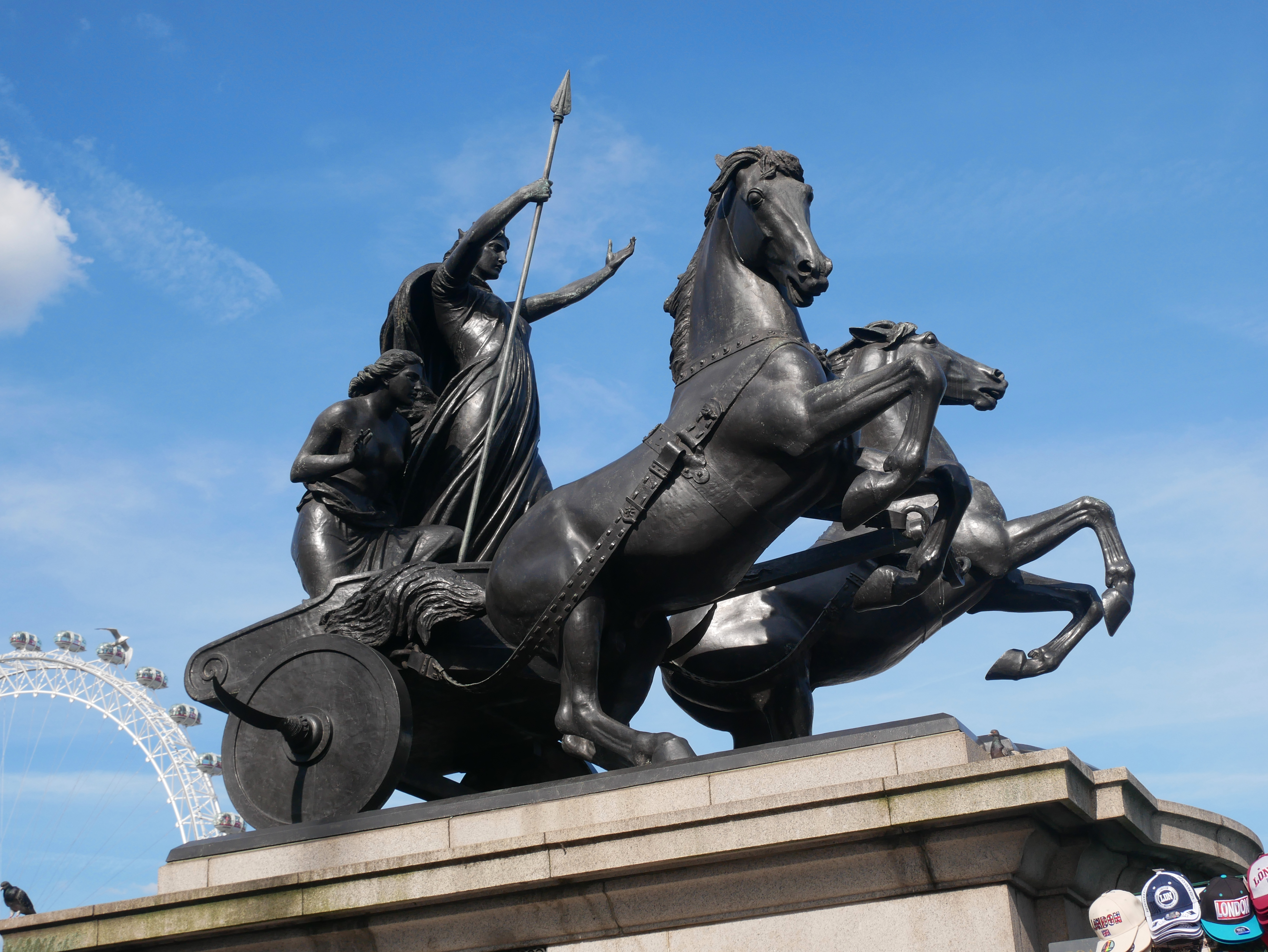
View of the statue from the southwest

The statue was commissioned in the 1850s, after Thornycroft made an equestrian statue of Queen Victoria which was exhibited at the Great Exhibition in 1851. The statue was praised by Queen Victoria and Prince Albert, and they were involved with Thornycroft's new project. Albert intended the monumental statue to be erected over the central arch of Decimus Burton's entrance to Hyde Park, and asked Thornycroft to make a "throne upon wheels". Parallels were drawn between Victoria and Boudica, whose name also means "victory". Albert lent two horses as models, and the statue bears some resemblance to a young Queen Victoria. Albert died in 1861 before the statue was completed. The pedestal accredits Thomas as the only creator but the personal papers of the Thornycroft family, held in the Henry Moore Institute in Leeds, indicate that all members of the Thornycroft family, consisting of six practising artists, including his wife Mary Thornycroft, his youngest son Hamo Thornycroft and his daughters Alyce Thornycroft, Helen Thornycroft and Theresa Thornycroft were involved at some level in the production phase. The Worcester Journal (26 March 1886) made the involvement of Mary known: 'It is stated that Mrs. Thornycroft, the sculptress, has decided to devote her remaining strength to the completion of the colossal group of Boadicea, which her husband left unfinished, and, consequently, she will undertake no more commissions, royal or otherwise.' Mary completed the statue sculptural group in Chiswick, the home of her eldest son John Isaac Thornycroft.

When the Thornycrofts' statue was completed by Mary after Thomas his death in 1885, Mary wanted to donate the statue to the City of London. The occasion presented itself when an earthwork known as "Boadicea's Grave" on the north side of Parliament Hill was excavated in 1894, although no grave was found. On behalf of his mother, John Isaac suggested that this site would be appropriate for the location of his father's long-delayed monumental statue. £6,000 for the casting in bronze was still not available. A committee was formed to raise funds by subscription. The necessary money was raised by 1898, and the statue was cast by the founder J. W. Singer in Frome for just £2,000. There was much discussion over the possible position. By the end of 1897 the north-east corner of Westminster Bridge, facing the Houses of Parliament, was approved by the London County Council. To consider the suitability of this position, it was decided to erect temporarily a plaster model of the statue on this site.

== Installation ==
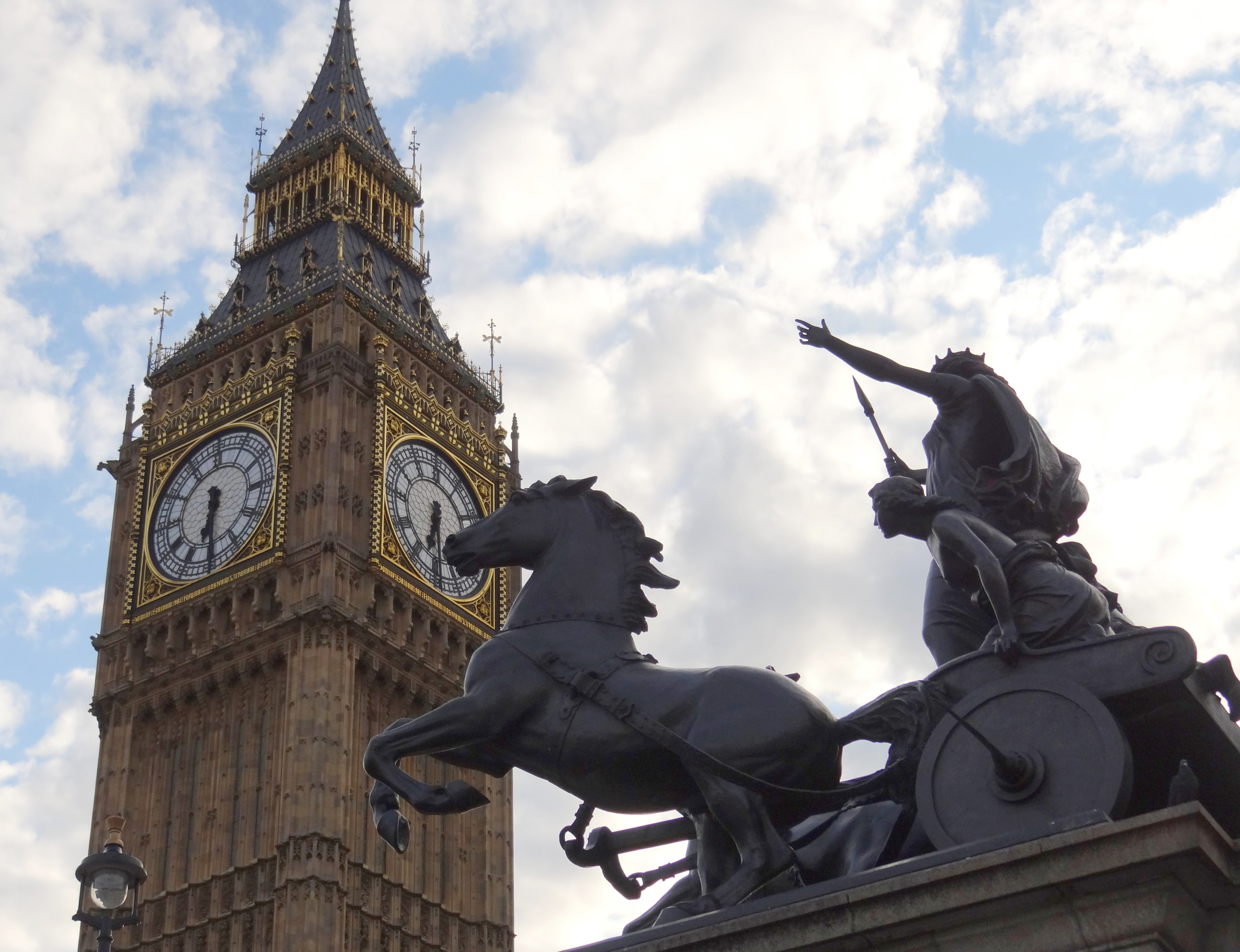
The statue is close to the Houses of Parliament

The trial plaster group was erected on 15 January 1898 and left to 'the man of the street' to judge of the artistic effect and the setting. Queen Victoria came to inspect the temporary statue on three March 1898. Although there was much debate in the periodical press and within the L.C.C., the location was approved. The statue in bronze was not installed until 1902. It was erected at Westminster Pier in June 1902, mounted on a large granite plinth by Thomas Graham Jackson. Inscriptions were added to the plinth in 1903; that on the front of the plinth reads BOADICEA/ (BOUDICCA)/ QUEEN OF THE ICENI/ WHO DIED A.D. 61/ AFTER LEADING HER PEOPLE/ AGAINST THE ROMAN INVADER. The right side of the plinth contains an inscription with text from William Cowper's poem Boadicea, an ode (1782): REGIONS CAESAR NEVER KNEW/ THY POSTERITY SHALL SWAY. An inscription on the plinth's left side reads, THIS STATUE BY THOMAS THORNYCROFT/ WAS PRESENTED TO LONDON BY HIS SON/ SIR JOHN ISAAC THORNYCROFT C.E./ AND PLACED HERE BY THE LONDON COUNTY COUNCIL/ A.D. 1902.

The statue is located in a busy position, with traffic from the Embankment and many pedestrian tourists passing from the Westminster Abbey, Parliament Square and Whitehall to the west over the bridge past the South Bank Lion towards County Hall, the London Eye, and Jubilee Gardens on the South Bank. Its plinth is often obscured behind a souvenir stall. It became a Grade II listed building in 1958.

== A suffrage symbol ==
The Boadicea's sculpted call-to-arms, facing the Houses of Parliament, provided an inspiring role model for the women's suffrage movement to unite and to reclaim (ancient) rights. As such the statue became a rallying point for suffrage demonstrations. On 2 March 1906 a small delegation of seven leading suffragettes of the Women's Social and Political Union (WSPU), including Annie Kenney and Flora Drummond, were among the first to use the Boadicea statue as an assembly point. This was only a prelude to a much bigger demonstration which took place on 19 May 1906, when a deputation of 350 suffragists and suffragettes, assembled 'at the foot of the beautiful monument to the warrior-queen, Boadicea', as the leader of the WSPU, Emmeline Pankhurst recalled in her autobiography. The statue was even transformed into a drawing in which Boadicea was waving a flag inscribed 'Votes for Women'. This drawing was given to released WSPU prisoners. Many suffragettes also wore a Boadicea brooch, inspired by the statue. In 1908, a "Boadicea Banner" was carried in several National Union of Women's Suffrage Societies marches.

== Assessments ==
In 1980, the historian and broadcaster Michael Wood described the depiction of "Boadicea" as resembling "Isadora Duncan as played by Vanessa Redgrave".

== See also ==
- 1902 in art
- List of public art on the Victoria Embankment
