= Boudica =

Queen of the British Iceni tribe (d. 60/61)

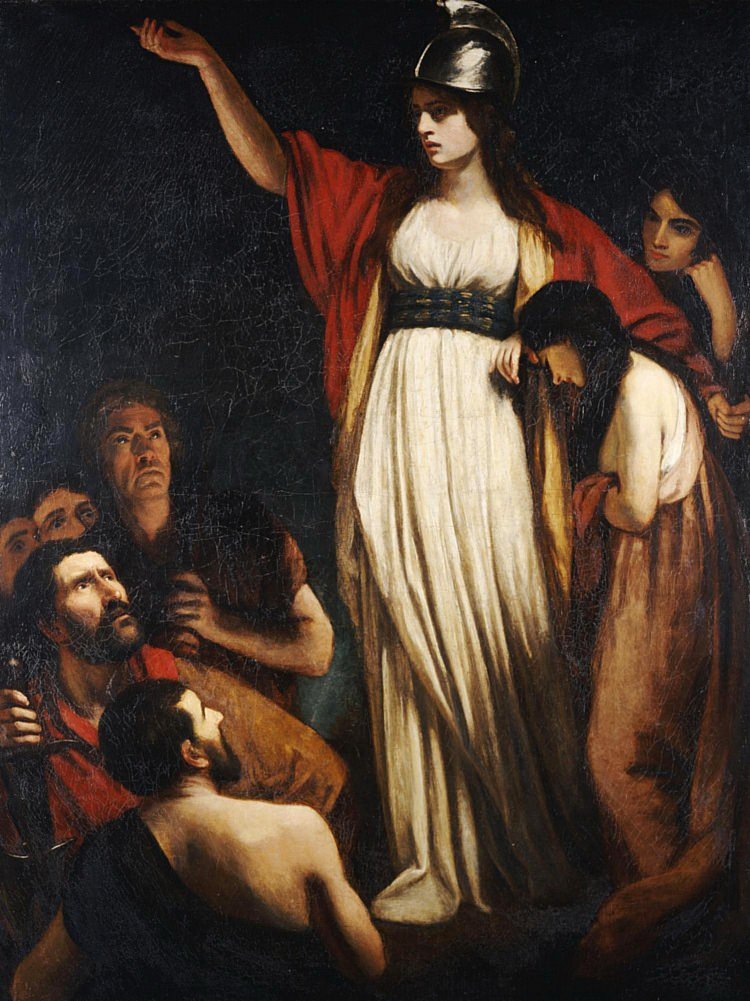
- Boadicea Haranguing the Britons (1793)

Queen of the Iceni
- Reign: c. 60–61 AD
- Predecessor: Prasutagus (King of the Iceni)

Consort of the king of the Iceni
- Reign: ? – c. 60 AD
- Born: Roman Britain, Roman Empire
- Died: c. 60/61 AD; Britain, Roman Empire
- Spouse: Prasutagus
- Issue: 2 daughters

Boudica or Boudicca (/ˈbuːdɪkə, boʊˈdɪkə/, from Brythonic *boudi 'victory, win' + *-kā (adjectival suffix), i.e., 'Victorious Woman', known in Latin chronicles as Boadicea or Boudicea and in Welsh as Buddug, pronounced [ˈbɨðɨɡ]) was a queen of the ancient British Iceni tribe who led a failed uprising against the conquering forces of the Roman Empire in AD 60 or 61. She is considered a British national heroine and a symbol of the struggle for justice and independence.

Boudica's husband, Prasutagus, with whom she had two daughters, ruled as a nominally independent ally of Rome. He left his kingdom jointly to his daughters and to the Roman emperor in his will. When he died, his will was ignored, and the kingdom was annexed and his property taken. According to the Roman historian Tacitus, Boudica was flogged and her daughters raped. The historian Cassius Dio wrote that previous imperial donations to influential Britons were confiscated and the Roman financier and philosopher Seneca called in the loans he had forced on the reluctant Britons.

In ad AD 60/61, Boudica led the Iceni and other British tribes in revolt. They destroyed Camulodunum (modern Colchester), earlier the capital of the Trinovantes but at that time a colonia for discharged Roman soldiers. Upon hearing of the revolt, the Roman governor Gaius Suetonius Paulinus hurried from the island of Mona (modern Anglesey) to Londinium, the 20-year-old commercial settlement that was the rebels' next target. Unable to defend the settlement, he abandoned it. Boudica's army defeated a detachment of the Legio IX Hispana and burned both Londinium and Verulamium. In all, an estimated 70,000–80,000 Romans and Britons were killed by Boudica's followers. Suetonius, meanwhile, regrouped his forces, possibly in the West Midlands, and despite being heavily outnumbered, he decisively defeated the Britons. Boudica died, by suicide or illness, shortly afterwards. The crisis of 60/61 caused Nero to consider withdrawing all his imperial forces from Britain, but Suetonius's victory over Boudica confirmed Roman control of the province.

Interest in these events was revived in the English Renaissance and led to Boudica's fame in the Victorian era and as a cultural symbol in Britain.

== Historical sources ==
The Boudican revolt against the Roman Empire is referred to in four works from classical antiquity written by three Roman historians: by Tacitus in the Agricola (c. 98) and Annals (c. 110s); by Suetonius, who mentions an uprising in his Lives of the Caesars (121); and by Cassius Dio, which is the longest account, including detailed description of the revolt contained within Cassius Dio's history of the Empire (c. 202 – c. 235).

Tacitus wrote some years after the rebellion, but his father-in-law Gnaeus Julius Agricola was an eyewitness to the events, having served in Britain as a tribune under Suetonius Paulinus during this period.

Cassius Dio began his history of Rome and its empire about 140 years after Boudica's death. Much is lost and his account of Boudica survives only in the epitome of an 11th-century Byzantine monk, John Xiphilinus. He provides greater and more lurid detail than Tacitus, but in general his details are often fictitious.

Both Tacitus and Dio give an account of battle-speeches given by Boudica, though it is thought that her words were never recorded during her life. Although imaginary, these speeches, designed to provide a comparison for readers of the antagonists' demands and approaches to war, and to portray the Romans as morally superior to their enemy, helped create an image of patriotism that turned Boudica into a legendary figure.

== Background ==
A map of Iceni lands in Norfolk

Boudica was the consort of Prasutagus, king of the Iceni, (Note: The sources describe Boudica as a wife and not a queen.) a tribe who inhabited what is now the English county of Norfolk and parts of the neighbouring counties of Cambridgeshire, Suffolk and Lincolnshire. The Iceni produced some of the earliest known British coins. They had revolted against the Romans in 47 when the Roman governor Publius Ostorius Scapula planned to disarm all the peoples of Britain under Roman control. The Romans allowed the kingdom to retain its independence once the uprising was suppressed.

== Events leading to the revolt ==
On his death in AD 60/61, Prasutagus made his two daughters as well as the Roman Emperor Nero his heirs. The Romans ignored the will, and the kingdom was absorbed into the province of Britannia. Catus Decianus, procurator of Britain, was sent to secure the Iceni kingdom for Rome.

"Have we not been robbed entirely of most of our possessions, and those the greatest, while for those that remain we pay taxes? Besides pasturing and tilling for them all our other possessions, do we not pay a yearly tribute for our very bodies? How much better it would be to have been sold to masters once for all than, possessing empty titles of freedom, to have to ransom ourselves every year! How much better to have been slain and to have perished than to go about with a tax on our heads!... Among the rest of mankind death frees even those who are in slavery to others; only in the case of the Romans do the very dead remain alive for their profit. Why is it that, though none of us has any money (how, indeed, could we, or where would we get it?), we are stripped and despoiled like a murderer's victims? And why should the Romans be expected to display moderation as time goes on, when they have behaved toward us in this fashion at the very outset, when all men show consideration even for the beasts they have newly captured?"

— Part of a speech Cassius Dio gives Boudica

The Romans' next actions were described by Tacitus, who detailed pillaging of the countryside, the ransacking of the king's household, and the brutal treatment of Boudica and her daughters. According to Tacitus, Boudica was flogged and her daughters were raped. These abuses are not mentioned in Dio's account, who instead cites three different causes for the rebellion: the recalling of loans that were given to the Britons by Seneca; Decianus Catus's confiscation of money formerly loaned to the Britons by the Emperor Claudius; and Boudica's own entreaties. The loans were thought by the Iceni to have been repaid by gift exchange.

Dio gives Boudica a speech to her people and their allies reminding them that life was much better before the Roman occupation, stressing that wealth cannot be enjoyed under slavery and placing the blame upon herself for not expelling the Romans as they had done when Julius Caesar invaded. The willingness of those seen as barbarians to sacrifice a higher quality of living under the Romans in exchange for their freedom and personal liberty was an important part of what Dio considered to be motivation for the rebellions.

== Uprising ==
=== Attacks on Camulodunum, Londinium and Verulamium ===
A map of the Boudican Revolt

The first target of the rebels was Camulodunum (modern Colchester), a Roman colonia for retired soldiers. A Roman temple had been erected there to Claudius, at great expense to the local population. Combined with brutal treatment of the Britons by the veterans, this had caused resentment towards the Romans.

The Iceni and the Trinovantes comprised an army of 120,000 men. Dio claimed that Boudica called upon the British goddess of victory Andraste to aid her army. Once the revolt had begun, the only Roman troops available to provide assistance, aside from the few within the colony, were 200 auxiliaries located in London, who were not equipped to fight Boudica's army. Camulodunum was captured by the rebels; those inhabitants who survived the initial attack took refuge in the Temple of Claudius for two days before they were killed. Quintus Petillius Cerialis, then commanding the Legio IX Hispana, attempted to relieve Camulodunum, but suffered an overwhelming defeat. The infantry with him were all killed and only the commander and some of his cavalry escaped. After this disaster, Catus Decianus, whose behaviour had provoked the rebellion, fled abroad to Gaul.

Suetonius was leading a campaign against the island of Mona, off the coast of North Wales. On hearing the news of the Iceni uprising, he left a garrison on Mona and returned to deal with Boudica. He moved quickly with a force of men through hostile territory to Londinium, which he reached before the arrival of Boudica's army but, outnumbered, he decided to abandon the town to the rebels, who burned it down after torturing and killing everyone who had remained. The rebels also sacked the municipium of Verulamium (modern St Albans), north-west of London, though the extent of its destruction is unclear.

Dio and Tacitus both reported that around 80,000 people were said to have been killed by the rebels. According to Tacitus, the Britons had no interest in taking the Roman population as prisoners, only in slaughter by "gibbet, fire, or cross". Dio adds that the noblest women were impaled on spikes and had their breasts cut off and sewn to their mouths, "to the accompaniment of sacrifices, banquets, and wanton behaviour" in sacred places, particularly the groves of Andraste.

=== Defeat and death ===
Suetonius regrouped his forces. He amassed an army of almost 10,000 men at an unidentified location, and took a stand in a defile (a narrow pass) with a wood behind. The Romans used the terrain to their advantage, launching javelins at the Britons before advancing in a wedge-shaped formation and deploying cavalry.

Ancient sources say, that the Roman army was outnumbered but Boudica's army was crushed, and according to Tacitus, neither the women nor the animals were spared. Tacitus states that Boudica poisoned herself; Dio says she fell sick and died, after which she was given a lavish burial. It has been argued that these accounts are not mutually exclusive.

== Name ==
Boudica may have been an honorific title, in which case the name by which she was known during most of her life is unknown. The English linguist and translator Kenneth Jackson concluded that the name Boudica—based on later developments in Welsh (Buddug) and Irish (Buaidheach)—derives from the Proto-Celtic feminine adjective *boudīkā 'victorious', which in turn is derived from the Celtic word *boudā 'victory', and that the correct spelling of the name in Common Brittonic (the British Celtic language) is Boudica, pronounced [boʊˈdiːkaː]. Variations on the historically correct Boudica include Boudicca, Bonduca, Boadicea, and Buduica. The Gaulish version of her name is attested in inscriptions as Boudiga in Bordeaux, Boudica in Lusitania, and Bodicca in Algeria.

Boudica's name was spelt incorrectly by Dio, who used Buduica. Her name was also misspelled by Tacitus, who added a second 'c.' After the misspelling was copied by a medieval scribe, further variations began to appear. Along with the second 'c' becoming an 'e,' an 'a' appeared in place of the 'u', which produced the medieval (and most common) version of the name, Boadicea. The true spelling was totally obscured when Boadicea first appeared in around the 17th century. William Cowper used this spelling in his poem Boadicea, an Ode (1782), which readapted Boudica's story to fit the context of Britain's rising territorial and political ambitions.

== Early literature ==
One of the earliest possible mentions of Boudica (excluding Tacitus' and Dio's accounts) was the 6th-century work De Excidio et Conquestu Britanniae by the British monk Gildas. In it, he demonstrates his knowledge of a female leader whom he describes as a "treacherous lioness" who "butchered the governors who had been left to give fuller voice and strength to the endeavours of Roman rule."

Both Bede's Ecclesiastical History of the English People (731) and the 9th-century work Historia Brittonum by the Welsh monk Nennius include references to the uprising of 60/61, but do not mention Boudica.

No contemporary description of Boudica exists. Dio, writing more than a century after her death, provided a detailed description of the Iceni queen (translated in 1925): "In stature she was very tall, in appearance most terrifying, in the glance of her eye most fierce, and her voice was harsh; a great mass of the tawniest hair fell to her hips; around her neck was a large golden necklace; and she wore a tunic of divers colours over which a thick mantle was fastened with a brooch. This was her invariable attire." (Note: The term xanthotrichos ('tawny') can also mean 'red–brown' or 'auburn', or a shade short of brown.)

== Revival and modern legend ==
=== 16th and 17th century literature ===
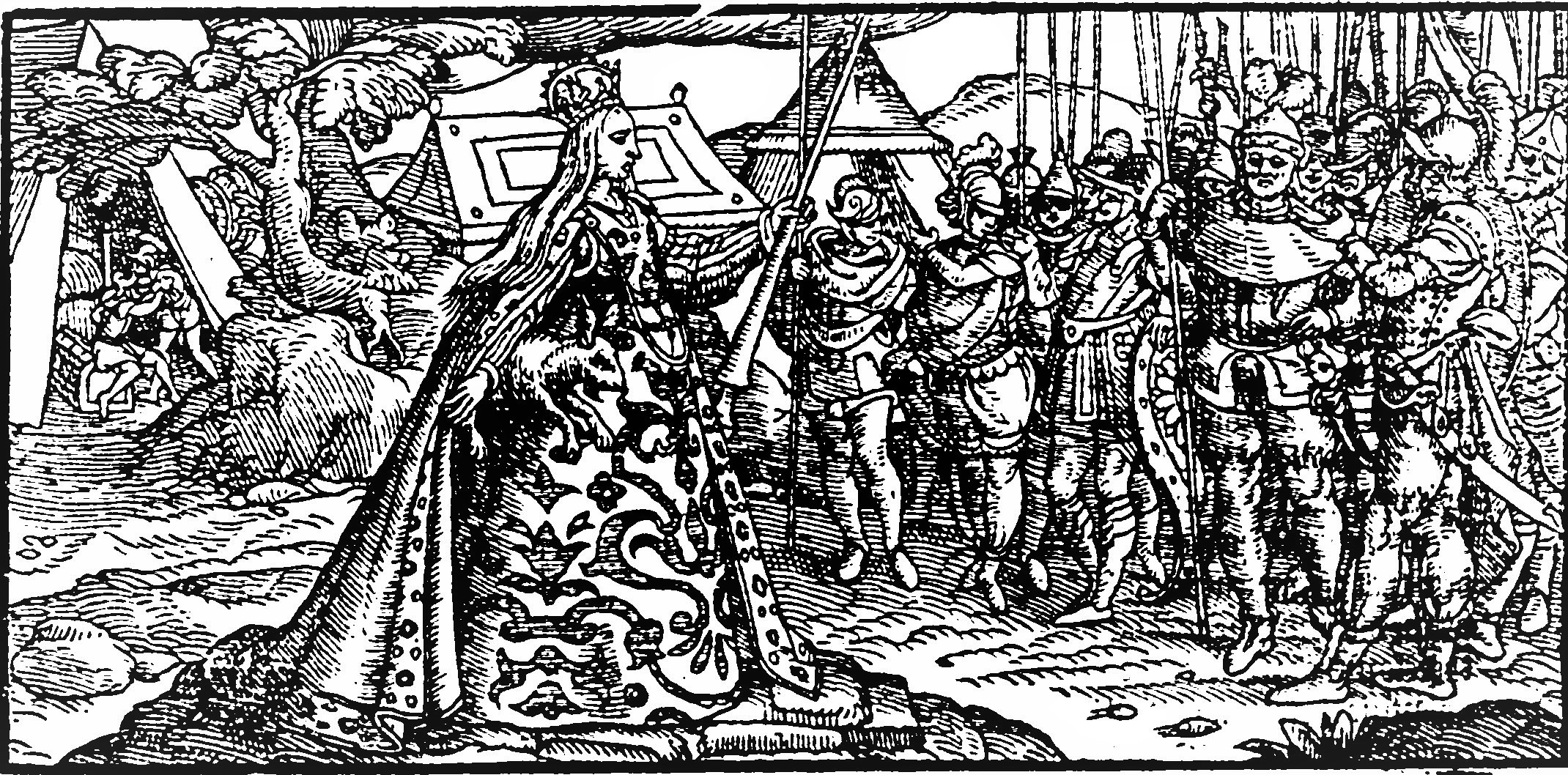
Boudica depicted as a Tudor queen in Holinshed's Chronicles (1577)

During the Renaissance the works of Tacitus and Cassius Dio became available in England, after which her status changed as it was interpreted by historians, poets and dramatists. Boudica appeared as 'Voadicia' in a history, Anglica Historia, by the Italian scholar Polydore Vergil, and in the Scottish historian Hector Boece's The History and Chronicles of Scotland (1526) she is 'Voada'—the first appearance of Boudica in a British publication.

Boudica was called 'Voadicia' in the English historian Raphael Holinshed's Chronicles, published between 1577 and 1587. A narrative by the Florentine scholar Petruccio Ubaldini in The Lives of the Noble Ladies of the Kingdom of England and Scotland (1591) includes two female characters, 'Voadicia' and 'Bunduica', both based on Boudica. From the 1570s to the 1590s, when Elizabeth I's England was at war with Spain, Boudica proved to be a valuable asset for the English.

The English poet Edmund Spenser used the story of Boudica in his poem The Ruines of Time, involving a story about a British heroine he called 'Bunduca'. A variation of this name was used in the Jacobean play Bonduca (1612), a tragicomedy that most scholars agree was written by John Fletcher, in which one of the characters was Boudica. A version of that play called Bonduca, or the British Heroine was set to music by the English composer Henry Purcell in 1695. One of the choruses, "Britons, Strike Home!", became a popular patriotic song in Britain during the 18th and 19th centuries.

=== Depiction during the 18th and 19th centuries ===
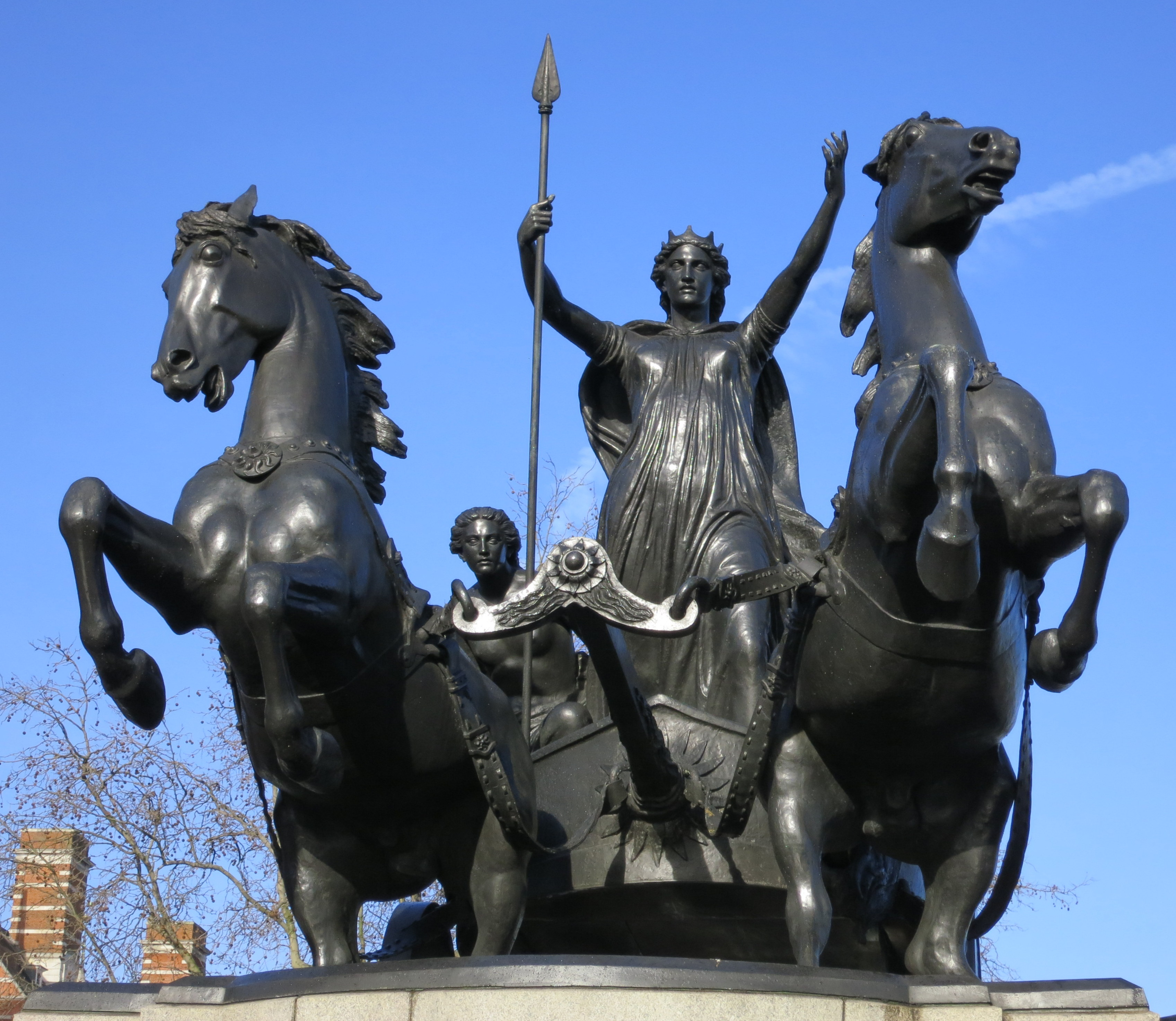
The statue Boadicea and Her Daughters by Thomas Thornycroft, near Westminster Pier, London

During the late 18th century, Boudica was used to develop ideas of English national identity. Illustrations of Boudica during this period—such as in Edward Barnard's New, Complete and Authentic History of England (1790) and the drawing by Thomas Stothard of the queen as a classical heroine—lacked historical accuracy. The illustration of Boudica by Robert Havell in Charles Hamilton Smith's The Costume of the Original Inhabitants of the British Islands from the Earliest Periods to the Sixth Century (1815) was an early attempt to depict her in an historically accurate way.

Cowper's 1782 poem Boadicea: An Ode was the most notable literary work to champion the resistance of the Britons, fostering an "asexual image of British triumph and heroism." It led Boudica to become a cultural icon and national heroine in Britain. Alfred, Lord Tennyson's poem Boädicéa, which was written in 1859 and published in 1864, drew on Cowper's poem. Depicting the Iceni queen as a violent and bloodthirsty warrior, the poem also forecasted the rise of the British Empire. Tennyson's image of Boudica was taken from the engraving produced in 1812 by Stothard. Another work, the poem "Boadicea" (1859) by Francis Barker, contained strongly patriotic and Christian themes.

A range of Victorian children's books mentioned Boudica; Beric the Briton (1893), a novel by G. A. Henty, with illustrations by William Parkinson, had a text based on the accounts of Tacitus and Dio.

Boadicea and Her Daughters, a statue of the queen in her war chariot, complete with anachronistic scythes on the wheel axles, was executed in the studio of the sculptor Thomas Thornycroft. He was encouraged by Prince Albert, who lent his horses for use as models. The statue, Thornycroft's most ambitious work, was produced between 1856 and 1871, cast in 1896, and positioned on the Victoria Embankment next to Westminster Bridge in 1902. The pedestal accredits Thomas as the only creator but the personal papers of the Thornycroft family, held in the Henry Moore Institute in Leeds, indicate that all members of the Thornycroft family, consisting of six practising artists, including his wife Mary Thornycroft, his youngest son Hamo Thornycroft and his daughters Alyce Thornycroft, Helen Thornycroft and Theresa Thornycroft were involved at some level in the production phase. The Worcester Journal (26 March 1886) made the involvement of Mary known: 'It is stated that Mrs. Thornycroft, the sculptress, has decided to devote her remaining strength to the completion of the colossal group of Boadicea, which her husband left unfinished, and, consequently, she will undertake no more commissions, royal or otherwise.'

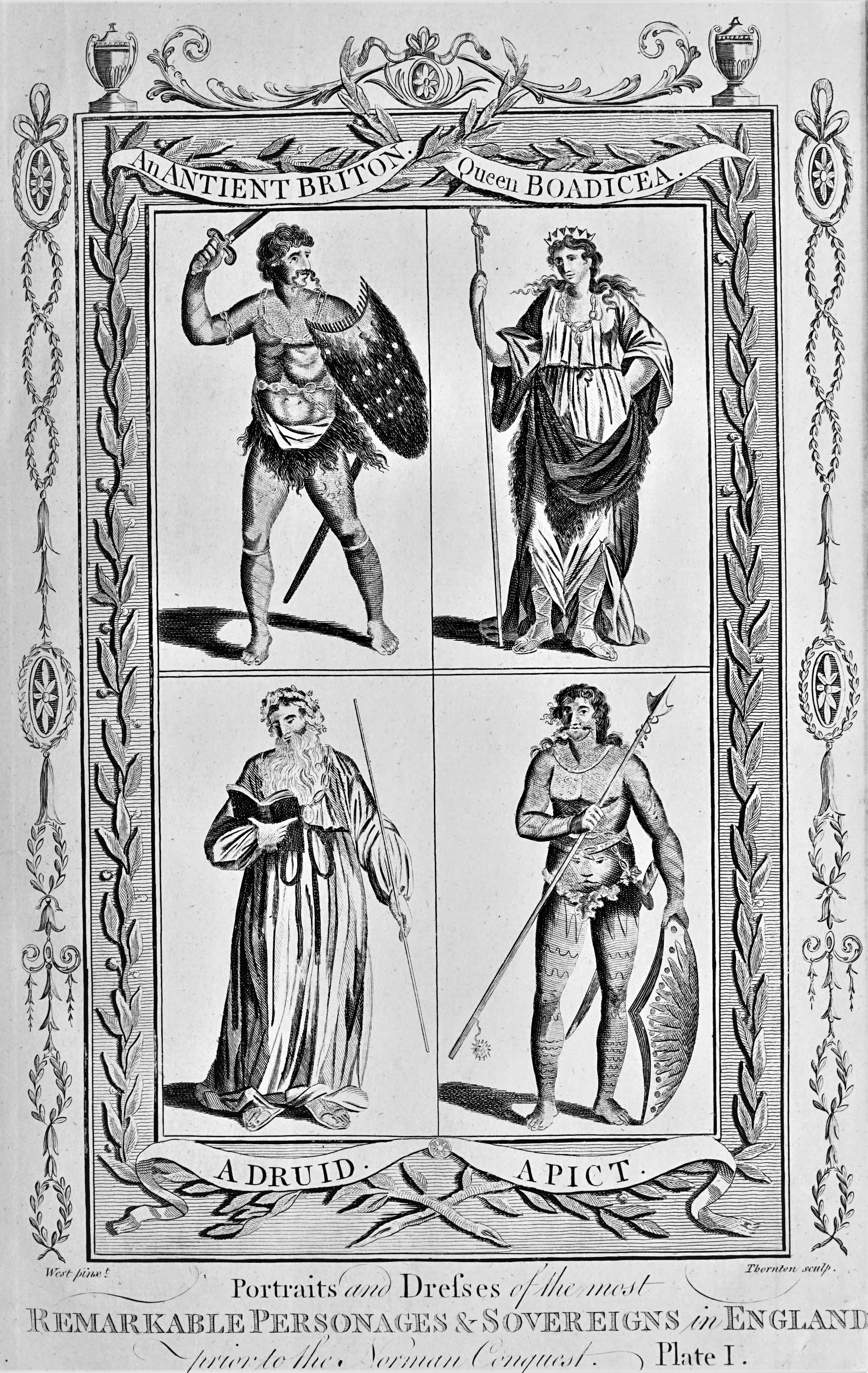
The History of England (1791), illustration by Francis West

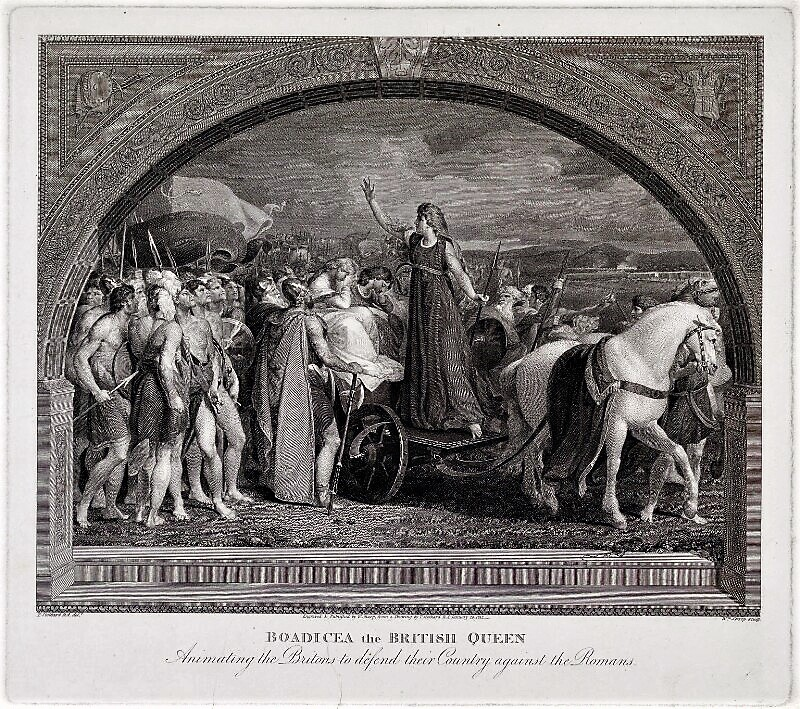
An engraving by William Sharp after Thomas Stothard (1812)

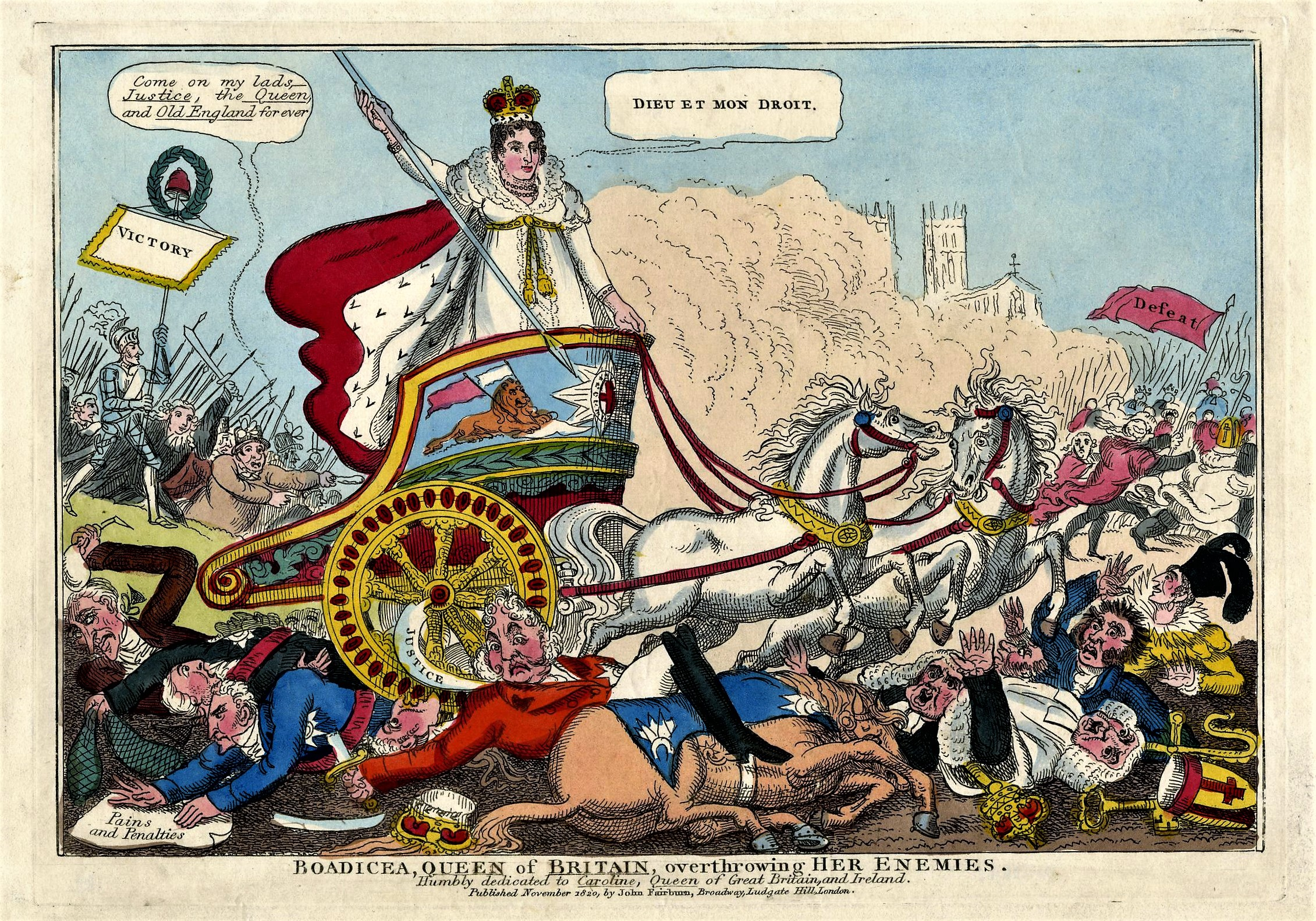
A caricature of Queen Caroline (1820)

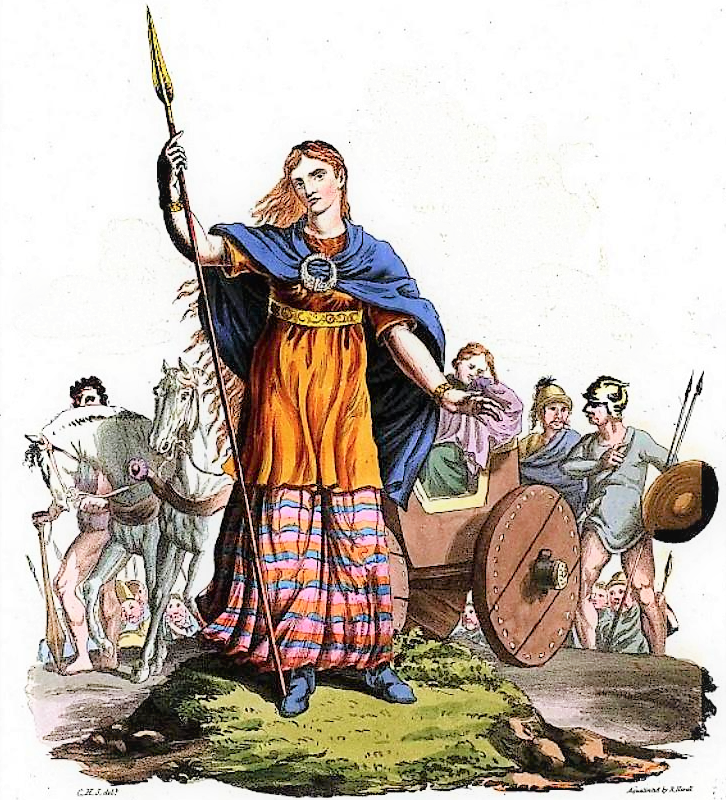
Robert Havell, The Costume of the Original Inhabitants of the British Islands (1821)

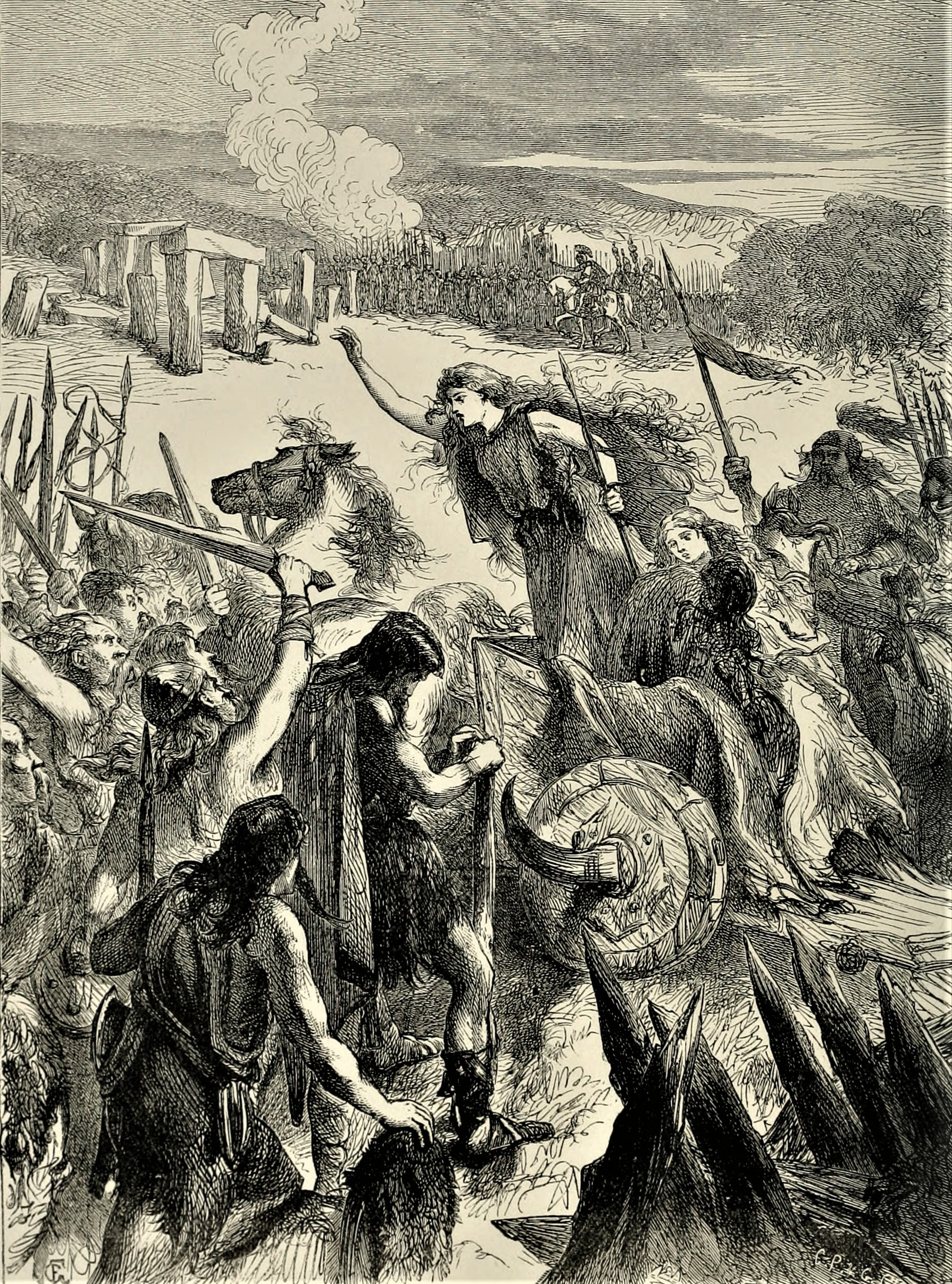
John Cassell's Illustrated History of England (1857)

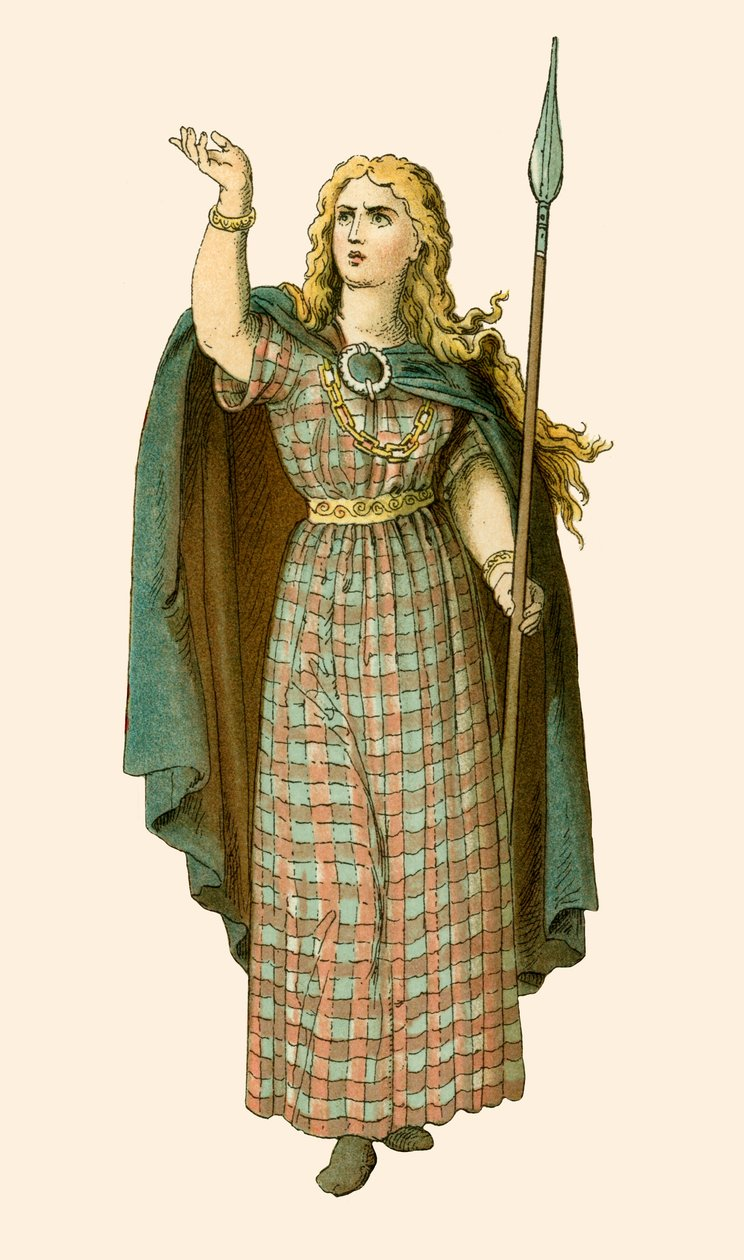
Illustration by Albert Kretschmer (1864)

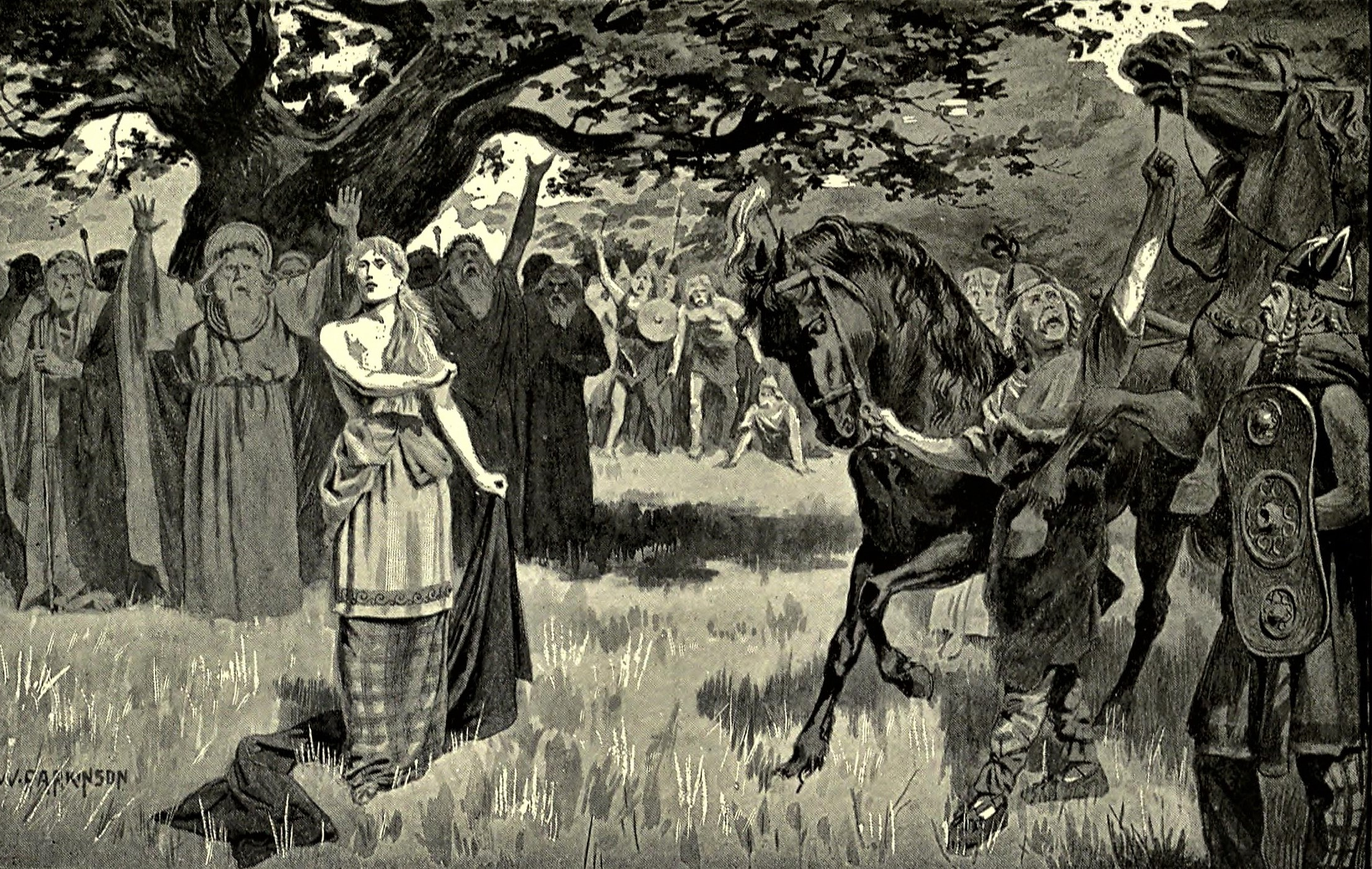
G.A. Henty, Beric, the Briton (1893)

=== 20th century – present ===
Boudica was once thought to have been buried at a place which lies now between platforms 9 and 10 in King's Cross station in London. There is no evidence for this and it is probably a post-World War II invention. At Colchester Town Hall, a life-sized statue of Boudica stands on the south facade, sculpted by L J Watts in 1902; another depiction of her is in a stained glass window by Clayton and Bell in the council chamber.

Boudica was adopted by the suffragettes and suffragists as one of the symbols of the campaign for women's suffrage. The statue became a rallying point for suffrage demonstrations. On 2 March 1906 a small delegation of seven leading members of the WSPU, including Annie Kenney and Flora Drummond were one of the first suffragettes to use the Boadicea as an assembly point. This was only a prelude to a much bigger demonstration which took place on 19 May 1906, when a deputation of 350 suffragists and suffragettes, assembled 'at the foot of the beautiful monument to the warrior-queen, Boadicea', as the leader of the WSPU, Emmeline Pankhurst recalled in her autobiography. The statue was even transformed into a drawing in which Boadicea was waving a flag inscribed 'Votes for Women'. This drawing was given to released WSPU prisoners. Many suffragettes even wore a Boadicea brooch, inspired by the statue. In 1908, a "Boadicea Banner" was carried in several National Union of Women's Suffrage Societies marches. She appears as a character in A Pageant of Great Women written by Cicely Hamilton, which opened at the Scala Theatre, London, in November 1909 before a national tour, and she was described in a 1909 pamphlet as "the eternal feminine... the guardian of the hearth, the avenger of its wrongs upon the defacer and the despoiler".

A "vocal minority" has claimed Boudica as a Celtic Welsh heroine. A statue of Boudica in the Marble Hall at Cardiff City Hall was among those unveiled by David Lloyd George in 1916, though the choice had gained little support in a public vote. It shows her with her daughters and without warrior trappings.

Permanent exhibitions describing the Boudican Revolt are at the Museum of London, Colchester Castle Museum and the Verulamium Museum in St Albans. A 36-mile (58 km) long distance footpath called Boudica's Way passes through countryside between Norwich and Diss in Norfolk.

In 2017, Shakespeare's Globe theatre staged a play by Tristan Bernays depicting Boudica's failed uprising, written in the style of a Shakespearean history play, with Gina McKee in the lead role.

== See also ==
- Gwenllian ferch Gruffydd
- List of women warriors in folklore
- Women in ancient warfare
