= Thornycroft family =

Family tree of the Thornycroft family, England

The Thornycroft family was a notable English family of sculptors, artists and engineers, connected by marriage to the historic Sassoon family. The earliest known mention of the family is stated in George Ormerod's History of Cheshire as during the reign of Henry III in the 13th century, taking its name from a Cheshire hamlet. Sir John Isaac Thornycroft (1843–1928) was the founder of the Thornycroft shipbuilding company.

Thornycroft family
Note: Dotted lines indicate non-marital union

John Francis; 1780–1861	Mary Evetts b. 1779	John Thornycroft; 1791–1822	Ann Cheetham; 1795–1875
Mary; 1809–1895	Thomas; 1815–1885	Sassoon family
John; 1843–1928	Blanche Ada Coules; 1846–1936	Mary Alyce; 1844–1906	Frances; 1846–1929	Helen; 1848–1937	William Hamo; 1850–1925 m. 1884	Agatha Cox; 1864–1958 see Olivier-Cox families	Theresa; 1853–1947	Alfred Sassoon; 1861–1895
John; 1872-1960	Blanche; 1873–1950	Herbert Farjeon; 1887–1945	Joan; 1888–1989	Brynhild Olivier; 1887–1935 m.(1) 1912 see Olivier-Cox families	Hugh Popham; 1889–1970 m.(1) 1912 m. (2) 1926	Rosalind; 1891–1973 m. (1) 1913 m. (2) 1926	Godwin Baynes; 1882–1943 m. 1913	Siegfried; 1886–1967	D. H. Lawrence; 1885–1930
Annabel; 1919–2004

== See also ==
Farjeon family
