= Poets' Fountain =

Fountain formerly in London

Coordinates: 51°30′18.31″N 0°9′1.81″W

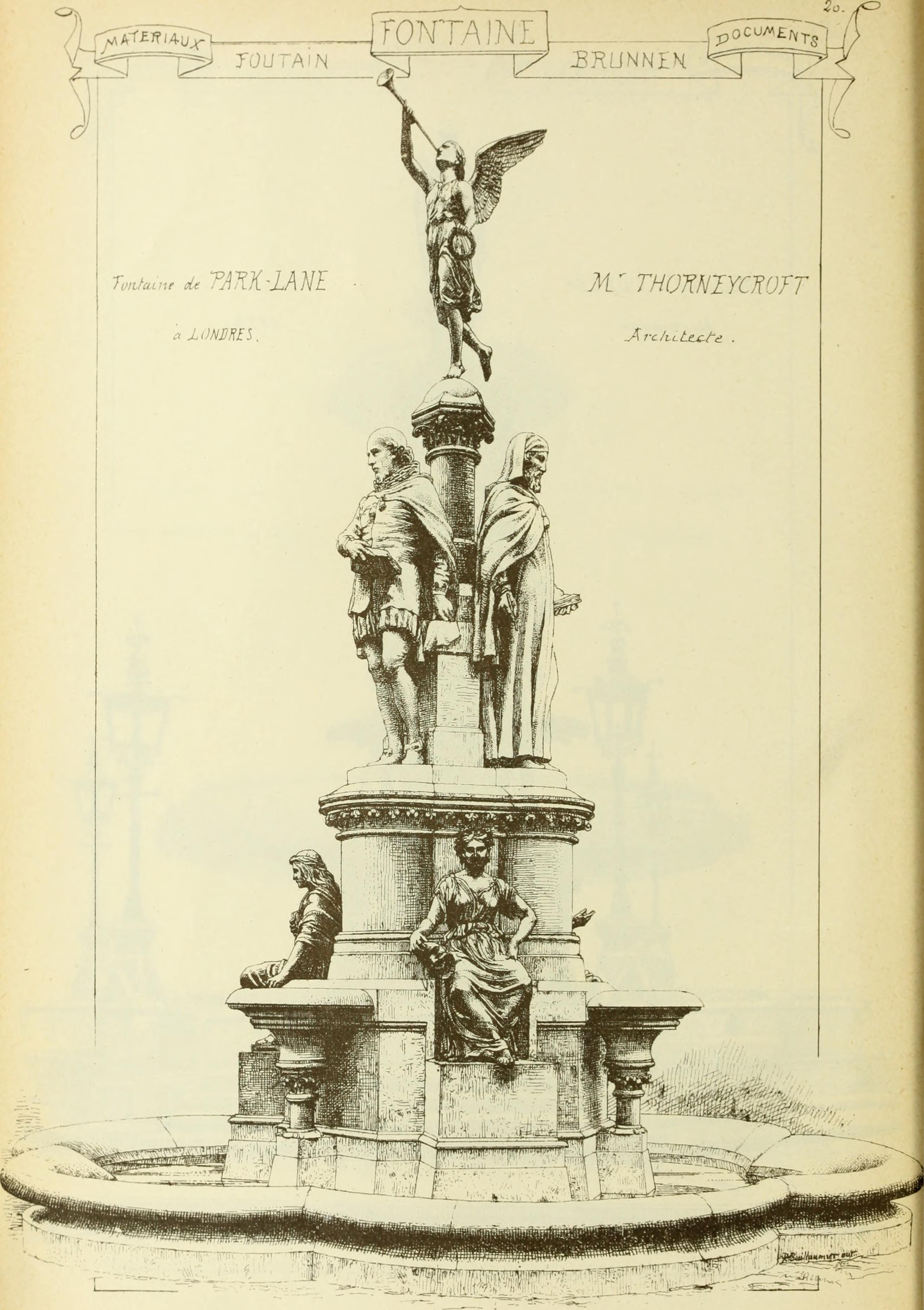
The fountain

The Poets' Fountain was a public fountain with sculptures that was installed on a traffic island in Park Lane, London, in 1875. It was removed in 1948 and it is thought to have been destroyed. One sculpture, an allegorical figure of Fame, is known to have survived and is displayed in the gardens at Renishaw Hall in Derbyshire.

The sculpture cost £5,000, the gift of Mrs Maria Mangini (sometime Mangin) Brown of Hertford Street, Mayfair. She was born in London in 1777, of Italian descent, and married Aquila Brown, a merchant from Baltimore, in 1792. Their daughter Harriet Mangin Brown married a Portuguese nobleman, the Comte d'Orta (later Viscount D'Alte), but died before her mother and was buried in Kensal Green Cemetery. Maria Mangini Brown died intestate in December 1871, aged 94, leaving an estate of over £250,000, but she had established a competition in 1871, shortly before her death, to design a sculpture to celebrate the glories of English poetry, to be installed near her house. The competition was won by the artist Thomas Thornycroft, and the sculpture was done by Thomas, assisted by his wife Mary Thornycroft and their son Hamo Thornycroft, with other members of the Thornycroft family as models.

The fountain included a basin, with seated bronze statues representing the muses of Comedy, Tragedy and History (respectively, Thalia, Melpomene and Clio). Above and between them were standing marble statues of Shakespeare (facing towards Hyde Park), Geoffrey Chaucer (facing towards Piccadilly) and John Milton (facing down Park Lane). The statue of Shakespeare was between the figures of Tragedy and Comedy, Milton between Tragedy and History, and Chaucer between Comedy and History.

The structure was topped by a gilded statue above representing a winged Fame, holding a laurel and blowing a trumpet (also oriented to point towards Hyde Park). In all, it was about 26 feet (7.9 m) high. Thomas worked on Milton, and designed the bronze seated muse of Tragedy. The statues of Chaucer, the muse of Comedy and Fame were all done by Hamo. Hamo considered that the sculpture of Fame was his best public work.

The fountain was inaugurated on 9 July 1875, at the junction of Hamilton Place and (old) Park Lane. It suffered bomb damage during the Blitz and was removed in 1948, possibly as part of the proposals to widen Park Lane. Most parts are lost, believed to have been destroyed, but the statue of Fame was rescued by Osbert Sitwell. It is displayed in the garden at Renishaw Hall in Derbyshire, where it is known as the Angel of Fame; it was regilded in 2002.
