= Alyce Thornycroft =

English painter (1844–1906)

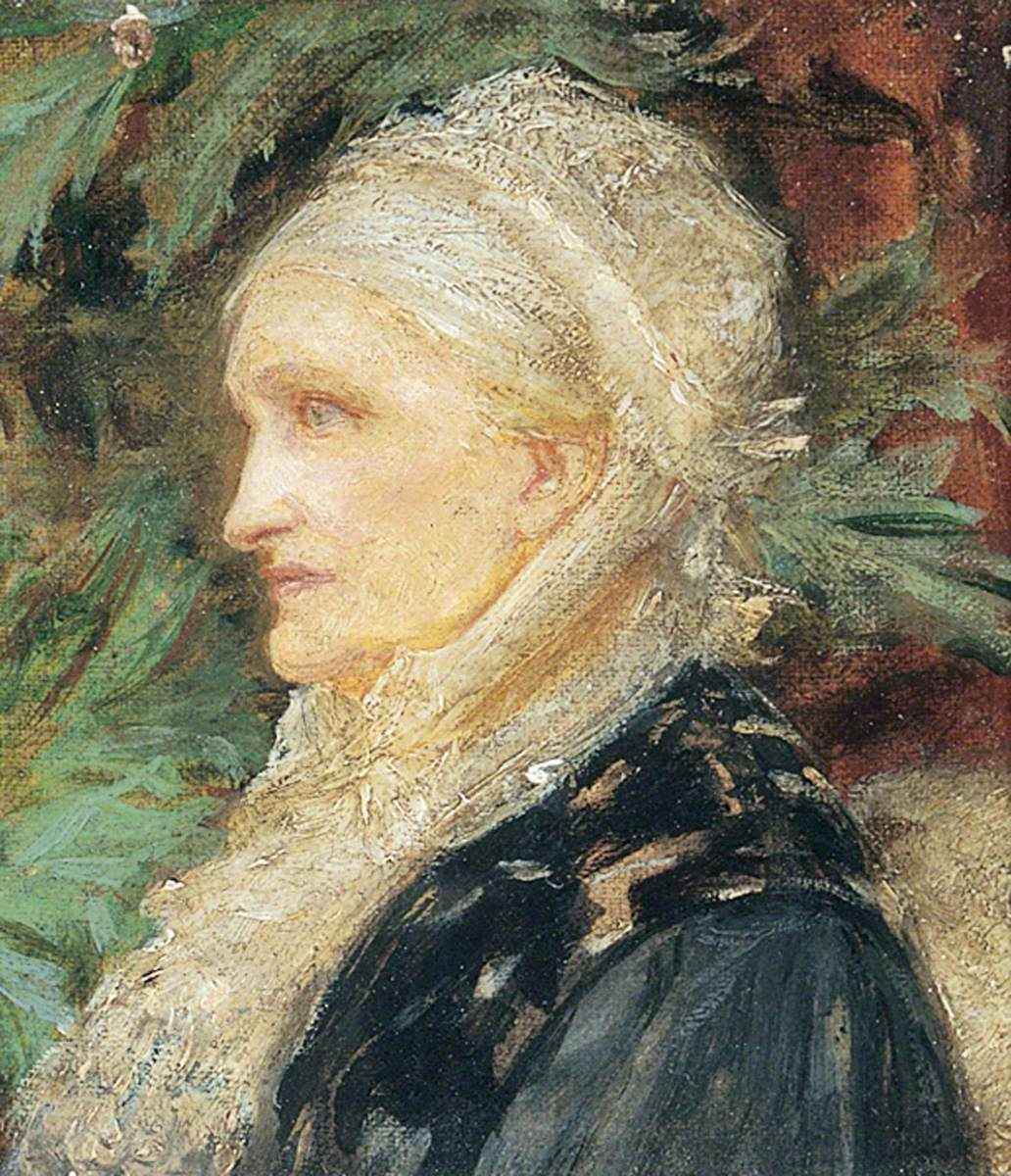
- Born: 1844
- Died: 1906 (aged 61–62)
- Occupations: painter, sculptor
- Parents: Thomas Thornycroft (father); Mary Thornycroft (mother)

Alyce Mary Thornycroft (1844 – 1906), also known as Mary Alyce and until 1865 as Alice, was a British sculptor and painter.

== Biography ==
Alyce Thornycroft was born in 1844, the eldest daughter of sculptors Thomas (1815–1885) and Mary Thornycroft (1814–1895). Among her siblings were several artists: the painter and sculptor Helen Thornycroft (1848–1937), the sculptor Hamo Thornycroft (1850–1925), and the painter Theresa Thornycroft (1853–1947). Her older brother was the naval engineer John Isaac Thornycroft (1843–1928). Along with her siblings, she received art lessons from her parents from an early age, particularly in sculpture. From childhood, she mastered modeling and carving sculptures from stone. At the age of 18, she began studying at the Royal Academy of Arts on the recommendation of the sculptor John Henry Foley, where she exhibited her first works in 1864. A year later, she changed the spelling of her first name from Alice to Alyce, inspired by her love of the medieval Pre-Raphaelite Brotherhood. She was involved in the production phase of Boadicea and Her Daughters, which her family worked on.

Financed by an inheritance from an aunt, Alyce traveled through France and Italy in 1871 with her brother Hamo and sister Helen. She spent the next few years at the family home, where she often worked with her parents and siblings. By this time, Alyce had increasingly turned away from sculpture and towards painting. She focused on portraiture in the style of George Frederic Watts and often used family members as models. She exhibited a portrait of her father at the Royal Academy of Arts in 1871 and another painting at the Society of Women Artists in 1872. During the 1870s and the following years, conflicts between Alyce and her siblings intensified, with her eldest sister describing her in diary entries as irritable and selfish. It seems that the main cause of the conflict was the contradiction between Alyce's desire for an artistic career and her perceived duty as the eldest sister to care for her elderly parents. However, she rejected Helen's efforts to help with their care. After her father's death, Alyce lived with her mother and was financially supported by her brother Hamo. She is documented to have participated in an exhibition at the Walker Art Gallery in Liverpool in 1892. In the last years before her death in 1906, she suffered increasingly from mental health problems.

A sculpture of her mother, made by Alyce Thornycroft, is now in the collection of the National Portrait Gallery in London. A portrait painting of her mother is in the Leeds Art Gallery. Although the works known to have been made by Thornycroft attest to her talent, her oeuvre is marginal compared to that of her siblings.
