= John Edward Thornycroft =

British mechanical & civil engineer (1872-1960)

Sir John Edward Thornycroft KBE
- Born: 5 September 1872; Chiswick, London, England
- Died: 21 November 1960 (aged 88)
- Education: St Paul's School, Central Technical College
- Father: Sir John Isaac Thornycroft
- Relatives: Blanche Thornycroft (sister)
- Engineering career
- Discipline: Civil, mechanical
- Institutions: Institution of Civil Engineers (president), Institution of Mechanical Engineers (president)

Sir John Edward Thornycroft, KBE (1872–1960) was a British mechanical and civil engineer. He worked for the family business of John I. Thornycroft & Company, a shipbuilder to the Royal Navy and others. He played a key role in the early development of destroyers and helped the business to branch into land-based transport as managing director from 1906. During the First World War Thornycroft developed the first coastal motor torpedo boats and launching systems for depth charges and was knighted for his work. He also played a key role in the Second World War, making technical decisions on warship armament. Shortly before his death his son, John Ward Thornycroft succeeded him as chairman and managing director of the company.

== Early life ==
Thornycroft was born in Chiswick on 5 September 1872, one of seven children and the eldest son of Blanche Ada née Coules and Sir John Isaac Thornycroft, the founder of the Thornycroft shipbuilding company. His sister, the naval architect Blanche Thornycroft played an increasingly recognised role in the family engineering business. His aunt and uncle were the sculptors Mary Thornycroft and Hamo Thornycroft. He was educated at St Paul's School, London before receiving engineering training at the Central Technical College in South Kensington. After receiving his college diploma in 1892 Thornycroft joined his father's shipyard at Church Wharf, Chiswick where he received further training from his father and John Donaldson.

== Family business ==
Completing his training in 1895 Thornycroft was appointed a draftsman and assistant to the manager of the engine works at the Chiswick yard, where he helped install machinery to torpedo boats and destroyers. Between 1896 and 1902 he was responsible for carrying out sea trials on these vessels and also carried out experimental work on boilers and other machinery. He helped to develop HMS Albatross an 1898 torpedo boat destroyer, an early milestone in the development of the type.

The family business was converted into a publicly listed company in 1901 and Thornycroft was appointed technical director in 1902, with responsibility for all construction work and new designs, including motor vehicles. Thornycroft became managing director in 1906 and was responsible for establishing new shipyards and engine works at Southampton and a motor vehicle works at Basingstoke.

== War work ==
Thornycroft worked on the design and construction of vessels for the Royal Navy during the First World War, a service for which he was appointed a Knight Commander of the Order of the British Empire in 1918. This included design and construction of the first coastal motor torpedo boats and depth charge launchers. He also developed road vehicles, including a steam-powered wagon and an oil-engined tractor. After the war he continued development of ships and land vehicles. During the Second World War he proved vital in making technical decisions regarding changes to and modification of naval weapons. Thronycroft was key in the early development of the destroyer from the Daring of 1893 to the Duchess of 1951.

Thornycroft resigned as chairman of the company on 20 July 1960, being then elected as president of its board. His eldest son, John Ward Thornycroft succeeded him as chairman and managing director. The elder Thornycroft died five months later on 21 November 1960.

== Recognition ==
Thornycroft was elected president of the Institution of Mechanical Engineers for the 1937 to 1938 session and of the Institution of Civil Engineers for the November 1942 to November 1943 session – he had become an associate member in 1899 and a full member in 1927. He was honorary vice-president of the Institution of Naval Architects from 1943 to his death and a member of the Institute of Transport and the Isle of Wight River Board. In 1946 Thornycroft was made a fellow of Imperial College London.

Professional and academic associations
Preceded by Sir Nigel Gresley	President of the Institution of Mechanical Engineers; 1937	Succeeded by David E Roberts
Preceded by Charles Inglis	President of the Institution of Civil Engineers; November 1942 – November 1943	Succeeded by David Anderson
