= Julia Constance Fletcher =

- Born: 1853; Brazil
- Died: 1938 (aged 84–85)
- Other name: George Fleming
- Education: Abbot Academy; Andover, Massachusetts
- Occupation: Author

Julia Constance Fletcher (1853–1938) was an author and playwright who professionally went by the pseudonym of George Fleming.

She was born in Brazil in 1853, the daughter of James Cooley Fletcher (1823-1901) and granddaughter of the banker Calvin Fletcher. Her mother was Henriette Malan, the daughter of a Swiss clergyman. She went to Abbot Academy, in Andover, Massachusetts, and was in the class of 1867.

After her parents' divorce, Julia went to live with her mother in Venice. Henriette had remarried, her second husband being a painter, Eugene Benson. Julia also spent some time in London. One of the sponsors of her early novels was Alfred Sassoon, a junior member of the wealthy Sassoon family and the father of Siegfried Sassoon. Alfred's infatuation with Julia was the catalyst for his desertion of his wife, Theresa. Julia's other supporters included her grandfather's friend Henry James, and she also knew Rudyard Kipling, Robert Browning and Walter Pater.

Two of her books, Kismet and Mirage, were published as "no name novels" by Roberts Brothers in Boston. Both books deal with Americans' adventures while traveling abroad, along the Nile and in Syria, respectively. Mirage has been described by Oscar Wilde scholar S. I. Salamensky, as a roman-á-clef fiction in which "a dangerously appealing, if slightly bi- or asexual, figure based on Wilde romantically pursues" a woman who is thought to represent Fletcher.

In 1900 she wrote a translation/adaptation of Edmond Rostand's play Les Romanesques, which she titled The Fantasticks. The 1960 musical of the same name, also based on Les Romanesques, borrows heavily from Fletcher's version.

== Selected works ==
- A Nile Novel, or Kismet (1876)
- Mirage (1878)
- The Head of Medusa (1880)
- Vestigia (1884)
- Andromeda: A Novel (1885)
- The truth about Clement Ker ... Told by his second cousin, Geoffrey Ker, of London (1889)
- For Plain Women Only (1895)
- Little Stories About Women (1897)
