= Eily Keary =

British naval architect, mechanical engineer

Eily Keary (later Eily Smith-Keary) (12 October 1892 – 19 October 1975) was a British naval architect, mechanical engineer and aeronautical engineer. She was one of the earliest female associates of the Institution of Naval Architects (now the Royal Institution of Naval Architects) and the first woman to have her papers given to that institution.

== Early life and education ==
She was born Eily Marguerite Leifchild Keary in London in 1892, the second of five daughters of Peter Keary, a newspaper proprietor and author renowned for his self-help books, and Jessie Richards, the daughter of a tailor. She was brought up in Wimbledon Park and went to Roedean School from 1908 to 1911. She went in 1921 to Newnham College, Cambridge, where she planned ‘to take the engineering course with her sister Elsie Keary and Rachel Parsons’. Eily Keary was the first woman to take honours in the mechanical sciences tripos in 1915, but as women were not then admitted to Cambridge degrees, she was unable to graduate at the time and received a titular degree in 1925.

== Work at the National Physical Laboratory ==
After finishing her Cambridge studies, she worked for a brief time at a company in Lewisham that made instruments for telegraphy, electricity and engineering. She was then appointed to the new William Froude Laboratory, known as the National Experiment Tank, at the National Physical Laboratory (NPL) by its supervisor, George S. Baker. There she began to work on the design of seaplane hulls and floats. Her collaboration with Baker led to several papers co-authored by her with him and others and published between 1916 and 1923, on topics including the experimental testing of model seaplane floats and of full size machines, the latter in collaboration with RAF personnel. Keary was the first woman to co-author (with Baker) a paper read to the Institution of Naval Architects in 1918, entitled ‘The effect of the longitudinal motion of a ship on its statical transverse stability’. This groundbreaking work has apparently been cited as late as 1988.

During the 1920s Keary travelled to Canada and the USA to undertake further research in naval architecture. She was also the sole author of papers given on topics such as flying boats and rudder force. Although some reports state that she left the NPL in 1929 just before her marriage the following year, in the 1930s she jointly authored papers on subjects such as barges, the effect of immersion on propellers and steering ships, given to the RINA, the North East Coast Institution of Engineers and Ship Builders, and the Institution of Marine Engineers.

== Recognition ==
Keary's work led to her election as the first female Associate Fellow of the Aeronautical Society of Great Britain in 1917; an NPL colleague also reportedly credited her with the design of floats for a seaplane that won the prestigious Schneider Trophy. After the First World War she became, together with Rachel Parsons and Blanche Thornycroft, one of the first three women associates of the Institution of Naval Architects. She was later made a full member.

In 2019, the Royal Institution of Naval Architects commemorated Eily Keary's achievements with the introduction of an annual award named after her. The Eily Keary Award is given to an individual, organisation or part of an organisation in recognition of their contribution to increasing equality, diversity and inclusion in their sector of the maritime industry.

== Personal life and death ==
Keary married Frederick Edmund Smith-Keary in 1930. He was a marine engineer and had changed his name by deed poll from Smith to Smith-Keary, the same surname that Eily adopted after her marriage. They had a son, born in 1931, and lived in Sussex and later Tasmania.

Eily Smith-Keary died at her home in Liverpool in 1975.
