= Blanche Thornycroft =

British naval architect and marine engineer

- Born: 21 December 1873; Hammersmith, Middlesex, England
- Died: 30 December 1950 (age 75); Bembridge, Isle of Wight
- Occupation: Marine engineer
- Employer: John I. Thornycroft & Company
- Parent(s): Sir John Isaac Thornycroft; Blanche Coules

Blanche Coules Thornycroft (21 December 1873 – 30 December 1950) was an English naval architect. She was not formally recognised in her lifetime but her role as an "assistant" is now better credited.

== Life ==
Thornycroft was born in 1873 in Hammersmith into the Thornycroft family, daughter of Blanche Ada (née Coules) (1846–1936) and John Isaac Thornycroft. She had four sisters, Edith Alice (1871–1959), Mary Beatrix (1875–1965), Ada Francis (1877–1965), and Eldred Elizabeth (1879– 1939), and two brothers. Her elder brother was John Edward Thornycroft. Her younger brother, Isaac Thomas (known as Tom) worked at the family firm until 1934. Her uncle was the sculptor Sir Hamo Thornycroft. She was the granddaughter of Thomas Thornycroft and Mary Thornycroft. Her father, John Isaac Thornycroft, was knighted in 1902.

== Naval Architecture ==
Although Blanche Thornycroft did not keep regular hours at her father's business, it is acknowledged that she made an unsung contribution to the business. She was trained in the same way as an apprentice would be trained and she was known as her father's assistant. Analysis however of correspondence with her brother and father reveal that she was regarded as a maths expert and her work was well regarded.

The Thornycroft family home in Bembridge had a model ship testing facility in its grounds, built in 1884, but disguised as a decorative water system known as “The Lilypond”. This was used for complex testing of model ships until 1909, when the need for a larger and indoor test tank was identified. A new test tank, one of the first buildings ever built by pouring concrete over steel, was built at Steyne Woods Battery.

The Experimental Boat Testing Tank Facility, at the Steyne Wood Battery in Bembridge on the Isle of Wight, (Grade II Listed Building Number 1426608) has six angled glazed panels below a concrete walkway, linked to a boiler within the battery to warm water, which was installed by Thornycroft as part of her interest in hydroponics.

Some of Blanche's monographed notebooks, recording her test notes from 1907 until 1939, along with the ship tank models used in her engineering calculations, are held at the Classic Boat Museum in East Cowes. The notebooks record her calculations for tests on the models trialled in the lily pond at the family home and later at the Experimental Boat Testing Tank Facility. These models were the basis for the development of Skimmers (racing motor boats), which later evolved into Coastal Motor Boats. Other models tested ideas for Acasta and Acheron Class Destroyers, motor torpedo boats, RAF Rescue Launches, as well as RNLI Lifeboats.

== Royal Institution of Naval Architects ==
She was one of the first three women to be admitted to the Royal Institution of Naval Architects on 9 April 1919 alongside engineers Rachel Parsons and Eily Keary and was a member of the Women's Engineering Society for twenty years.

== Death ==
Blanche Thornycroft died in Bembridge in 1950.
