= John Francis (sculptor) =

English sculptor

John Francis (3 September 1780 – 30 August 1861) was an English sculptor.

== Life ==
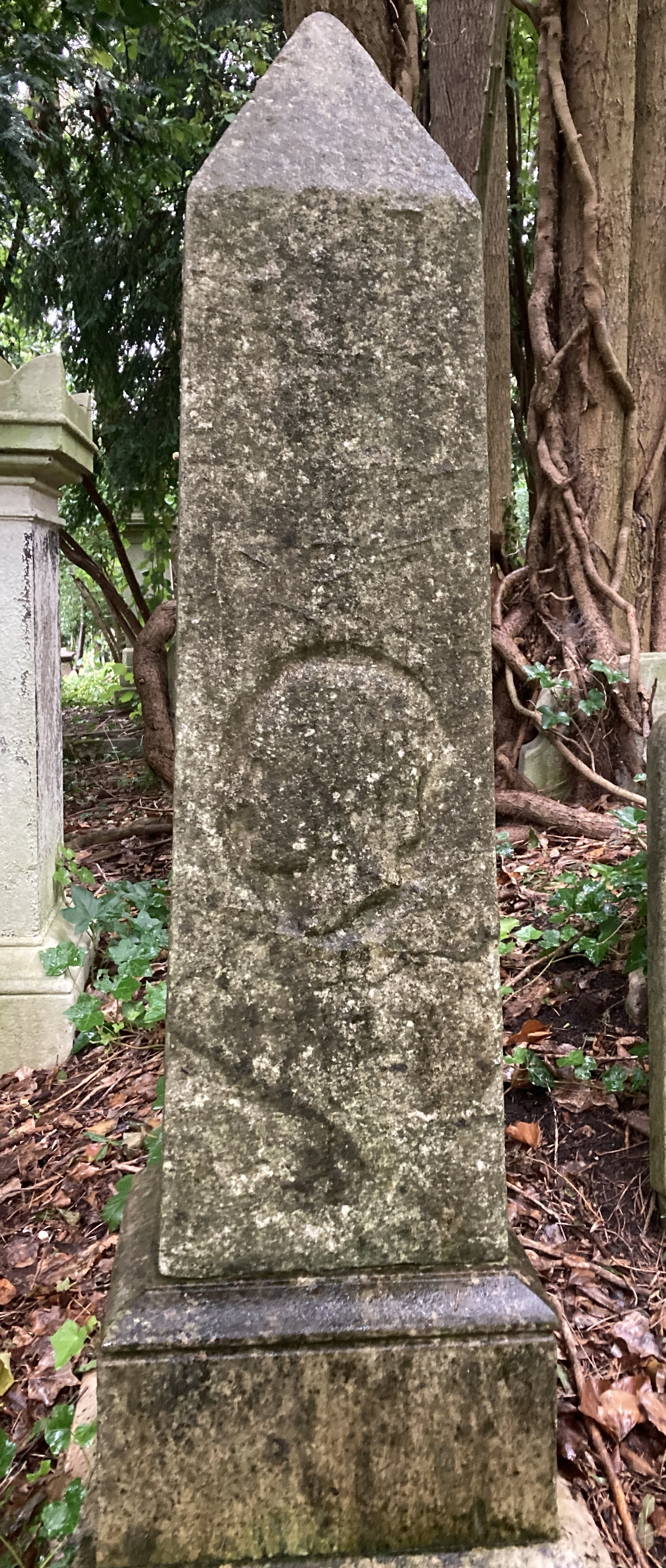
Grave of John Francis in Highgate Cemetery

Francis was born in Lincolnshire, and was intended to go into farming. He settled in London, where he became a pupil of Samuel Joseph and Francis Leggatt Chantrey. He first exhibited at the Royal Academy in 1820 a bust of Thomas William Coke, and another of Captain Sir William Bolton, R.N. At this period his residence was at Thornham, Norfolk. In 1822, when he sent to the Academy a bust of Horatia Nelson, he was living at 2 New Norfolk Street, Park Lane.

In 1844 he executed by command of Queen Victoria a marble bust of Albert, Prince Consort; this followed a commission a few years earlier for a bust of the Queen, which went to the hall of the Reform Club. About this period Francis moved to 56 Albany Street, Regent's Park.

He taught his daughter Mary, who married his pupil Thomas Thornycroft. Other pupils included Joseph Durham and Matthew Noble.

Francis died at his home in Albany Street, aged 80 and is buried on the western side of Highgate Cemetery (plot no.3058).

== Works ==
Among his other works were:

- Bust of Arthur Wellesley, the Duke of wellington at Apsley House (1818)
- Bust of Lord Holland at Holland House (1829)
- Statue of the Duke of Sutherland in Dornoch Cathedral (1843)
- posthumous bust of Ernest I, Duke of Saxe-Coburg and Gotha (1844);
- busts of the Duke and Duchess of Norfolk (1844);
- bust in bronze of the Duke of Sussex (1847);
- marble bust of Lord John Russell, which went to the National Portrait Gallery (1848);
- a bronze medal of Eos, a favourite greyhound of Prince Albert (1848);
- marble bust of the Hon. Edward Petre (1848);
- four busts, in marble, of various members of the Eaton family (1851);
- posthumous bust of the Earl of Carlisle (1852);
- bust of the Duke of Wellington, which went to the National Portrait Gallery (1852);
- posthumous bust of the Hon. and Rev. James Norton (1854);
- bust of Vice-admiral Sir Charles Napier (1855);
- cabinet bust of the Right Hon. Earl of Aberdeen (1856).
