= Royal Institution of Naval Architects =

International organisation representing naval architects

- Founded: 1860
- Founder: Edward Reed, Rev Joseph Woolley, John Penn and Frederick Kynaston Barnes
- Type: Professional Institution
- Purpose: Naval Architects
- Headquarters: 8-9, Northumberland St, London WC2N 5DA
- Location: London, United Kingdom
- Region served: Worldwide
- Method: International Membership, Conferences, Publications
- Key people: Charles III (Patron), Paul Jobson (Chief Executive),
- Website: rina.org.uk

The Royal Institution of Naval Architects (also known as RINA) is a professional institution and global governing body for naval architecture and maritime engineering. Members work in industry, academia, and maritime organisations worldwide, participating in the design, construction, repair, and operation of ships, boats, and marine structures in over 90 countries.

The Patron of the Institution was Queen Elizabeth II but is now King Charles III.

== History ==
The Royal Institution of Naval Architects was founded in Britain in 1860 as The Institution of Naval Architects and was incorporated by Royal Charter in 1910 and 1960 to "advance the art and science of ship design."

Founding members included John Scott Russell, Edward Reed, Rev. Joseph Woolley, Nathaniel Barnaby, Frederick Kynaston Barnes, and John Penn.

On April 9, 1919, Blanche Thornycroft, Rachel Mary Parsons, and Eily Keary became the first women admitted into the institution. Fellows of the institution use the post-nominal designation "FRINA".

== Arms ==
Coat of arms of Royal Institution of Naval Architects
Notes Granted 10 February 1955 Crest On a wreath Argent and Azure, A lymphad Proper, sail barry wavy of eight Argent and Azure charged with a sun in splendour Or, pennon and flags flying also Azure. Escutcheon Per fess wavy azure and barry wavy of six Argent and of the first, issuant from the fess line a sun in splendour; over all a three-masted ship of the seventeenth century in full sail Proper, pennon and flags flying also of the first. Supporters On either side a dolphin Or, gorged with a naval crown with a rope pendent therefrom and reflexed over the back Azure.

== Historical members ==
The following have been members of the society historically:

- David Keith Brown (1928–2008)
- Peter Du Cane CBE (1901–1984)
- William John Macquorn Rankine FRSE FRS (1820–1872)
- Sir John Isaac Thornycroft (1843–1928)
- Bernard Waymouth (1824–1890)
- Sir Eric Yarrow MBE (1920–2018)

== See also ==
- Royal Society of Arts
