= Theresa Thornycroft =

English sculptor and painter

- Born: 1853
- Died: 1947 (aged 93–94)
- Occupations: Sculptor; Painter
- Spouse: Alfred Ezra Sassoon
- Children: 3, including Siegfried Sassoon
- Parent(s): Thomas Thornycroft; Mary Francis

Theresa Thornycroft (1853 – July 1947) was an English sculptor and painter.

== Biography ==
Born Theresa Georgina Thornycroft, she was a member of the inventive and artistic branch of the Thornycroft family. Her father was the sculptor and engineer Thomas Thornycroft (1815–1885), and her mother, the sculptor Mary Francis (1814–1895), worked under both her maiden name and her married name. Theresa's brother Sir Hamo Thornycroft was also a sculptor, her sisters Alyce Thornycroft and Helen Thornycroft were artists, and her brother Sir John Isaac Thornycroft was the founder of the Thornycroft shipbuilding company. Her niece was the naval architect Blanche Thornycroft.

A gifted artist, she exhibited her paintings at the Royal Academy of Arts in London before she turned twenty-two.

She married Alfred Ezra Sassoon (1861–1895) of the Jewish Sassoon family. Because she was Anglo-Catholic, he was disinherited by the Sassoon family for marrying her. They had three sons:

- Michael Thornycroft Sassoon (1884–1969)
- Siegfried Sassoon (1886–1967)
- Hamo Watts Sassoon (1887–1915)

In 1890, Alfred left Theresa, apparently infatuated with the American writer, Julia Constance Fletcher; he continued to see the children occasionally until his death, aged 33, in 1895, in East Sussex, from tuberculosis. Theresa continued to live in the village of Matfield in Kent, and was immortalised in the memoirs of her son Siegfried.
