= Helen Thornycroft =

British artist (1848–1937)

- Helen Thornycroft (Portrait of the Artist), attributed to Edith Martineau
- Born: 1848; London, England
- Died: 11 November 1937 (aged 88–89); Kensington, London
- Known for: Painting

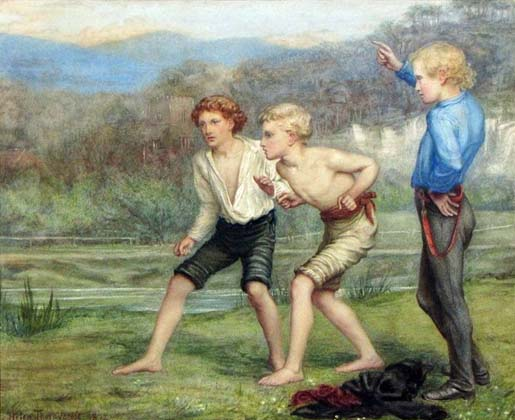
One two three and away, 1872

Helen Thornycroft (1848 – 11 November 1937) was an English painter and watercolourist of the Victorian era.

== Biography ==
Born in London, she was a member of the Thornycroft family of sculptors, which included her maternal grandfather John Francis, her father Thomas Thornycroft, her mother Mary Thornycroft, and her younger brother Hamo Thornycroft. Hamo and Helen's sisters Alyce (1844–1906) and Theresa (1853–1947) were both artists as well. Edmund Gosse was a relative by marriage. (The family had strong multiple connections with the English art world of the nineteenth century; Theresa Thornycroft and Ellen Thornycroft Gosse studied painting under Ford Madox Brown.)

Helen's brother John Isaac Thornycroft began his shipbuilding career by constructing a steam launch at home in his late teens. Helen, nicknamed "Nello," was reportedly his "only helper" in this endeavor. While helping John Isaac, she was "nearly scalped" when her hair tangled in his machinery; she wore her hair short from then on, in defiance of the reigning custom.

Helen, Hamo, Alyce, and Theresa were all trained in the Royal Academy schools starting in the 1860s, when the institution was only beginning to take female students. The date and circumstances of Helen's entry are disputed; by one account, she applied in 1862, but was rejected by Sir Edwin Landseer because of her youth (she was 14 at the time). Helen started out as a sculptor like previous generations of her family; she exhibited a statue of Ophelia in the Royal Academy summer show of 1864. Within a year or two, however, she abandoned sculpture to concentrate on painting.

Helen travelled abroad with Hamo and Alyce in 1871; the siblings studied art with and modeled for each other through the 1870s. Hamo's journals, kept during this period, provide ample evidence on the family's affairs. By Hamo's account, the young Helen enjoyed a "wonderful" supply of natural energy. His journals record an evening when the two of them walked home at 2:00 AM; Helen was up by 6:30 to go swimming, then worked at the Royal Academy schools until 2:00 PM.

"Helen was a more prolific and committed artist than her sisters" — by the late 1880s she had her own studio and her own apartment, which was again unusual for the time. She became known primarily as a flower painter, a genre long associated with women; yet she also worked in other genres, including landscape and portraiture. Thornycroft exhibited her work at the Palace of Fine Arts at the 1893 World's Columbian Exposition in Chicago, Illinois. She spent a decade (1899–1909) as vice-president of the Society of Women Artists. She never married. Many sources mistakenly give the year of her death as 1912.
