= John Isaac Thornycroft =

British shipbuilder (1843-1928)

Sir John Isaac Thornycroft FRS
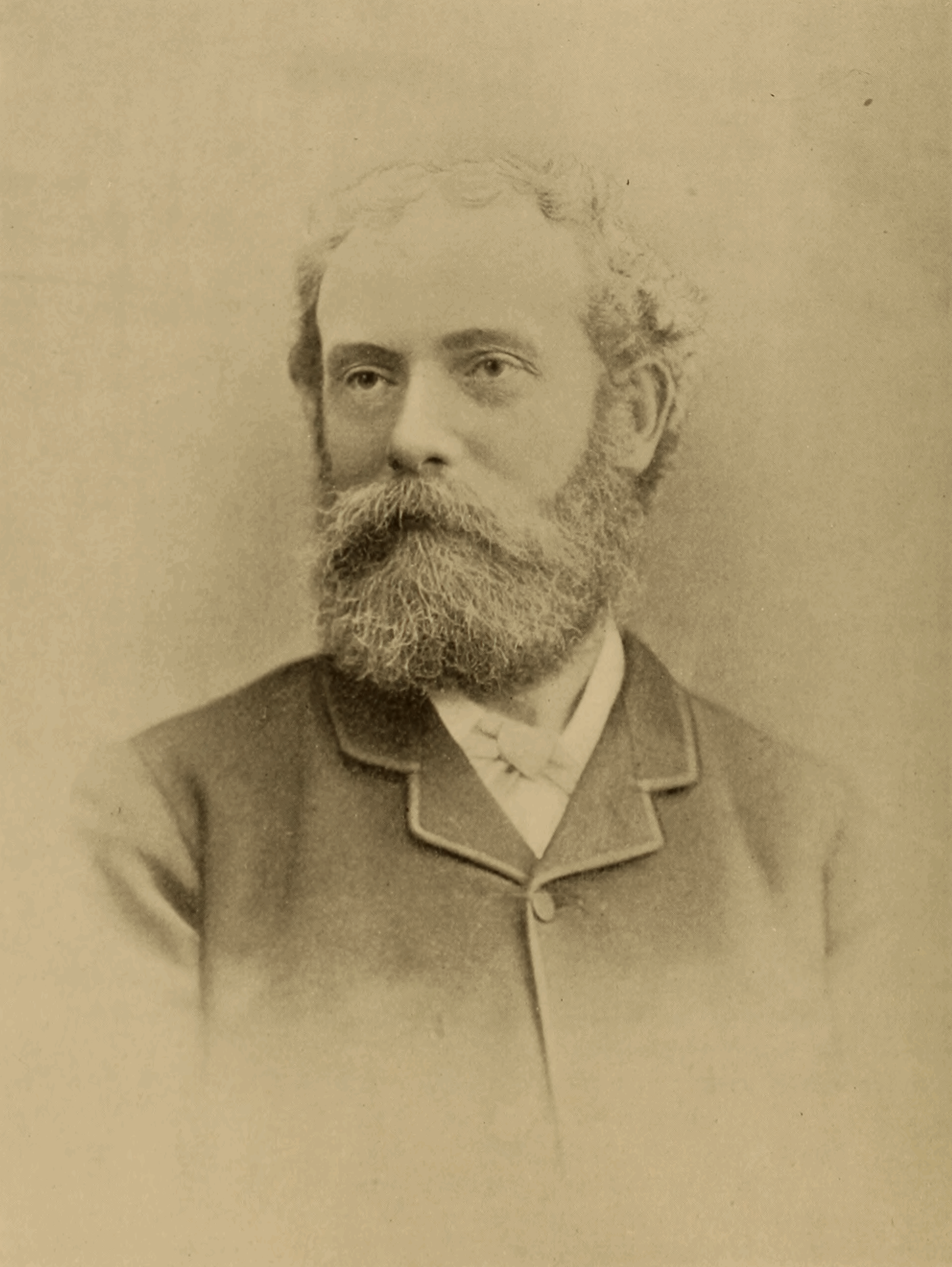
- Photographic portrait from Cassier's Magazine, 1896
- Born: 1 February 1843; Via Sistina, Rome, Papal States
- Died: 28 June 1928 (aged 85); Bembridge, Isle of Wight, England
- Spouse: Blanche Coules
- Children: John Edward Thornycroft; Blanche Thornycroft
- Parents: Thomas Thornycroft (father); Mary Francis (mother)
- Engineering career
- Discipline: Civil, Mechanical, Naval architect
- Institutions: Institution of Naval Architects (Honorary Vice-President), Royal Society (Fellow, 1893), Institution of Civil Engineers (Council Member 1899–1907), Institution of Mechanical Engineers (Honorary Life Member), University of Glasgow (LL.D., 1901).
- Projects: High speed vessels, steam- and combustion-engine vehicles.
- Significant design: Hull designs, boiler designs

Sir John Isaac Thornycroft FRS (1 February 1843 – 28 June 1928) was an English shipbuilder, the founder of the Thornycroft shipbuilding company and member of the Thornycroft family.

== Early life ==
He was born in 1843 to Mary Francis and Thomas Thornycroft. He attended the Regent Street Polytechnic and then the Royal School of Naval Architecture and Marine Engineering at South Kensington and at the same time, he began building the steam launch Nautilus in his father's study. Nautilus was a fast boat with a reliable engine (also built by Thornycroft), and in 1862 it proved to be the first steam launch with enough speed to follow the contenders in the University race. The ensuing publicity prompted his father to purchase a strip of land along the Thames, adjacent to Chesterman's yard at Chiswick in 1864, and that became the start of John Thornycroft's shipbuilding career.

In 1866 Thornycroft took over Chesterman's yard completely, and John I. Thornycroft & Company was formally established, but at the beginning, John Thornycroft did not work there full-time. Instead he worked for a while at Palmers Shipbuilding and Iron Company in Jarrow-on-Tyne before studying for a diploma in engineering at the University of Glasgow. At Glasgow he studied under Lord Kelvin and Professor Macquorn Rankine.

In 1870, Thornycroft married Blanche Ada Coules (1846–1936) and they had two sons and five daughters. Three of their children, John Edward Thornycroft, Blanche Thornycroft and Isaac Thomas (known as Tom) Thornycroft would go on to be involved in the family business. Edith Alice; Mary Beatrix; Ada Francis; and Eldred Elizabeth do not seem to have been involved.

On his return from Scotland Thornycroft built the fast steam yacht Miranda in 1871, and thereby proved that small vessels could obtain speeds that were not thought possible at the time.

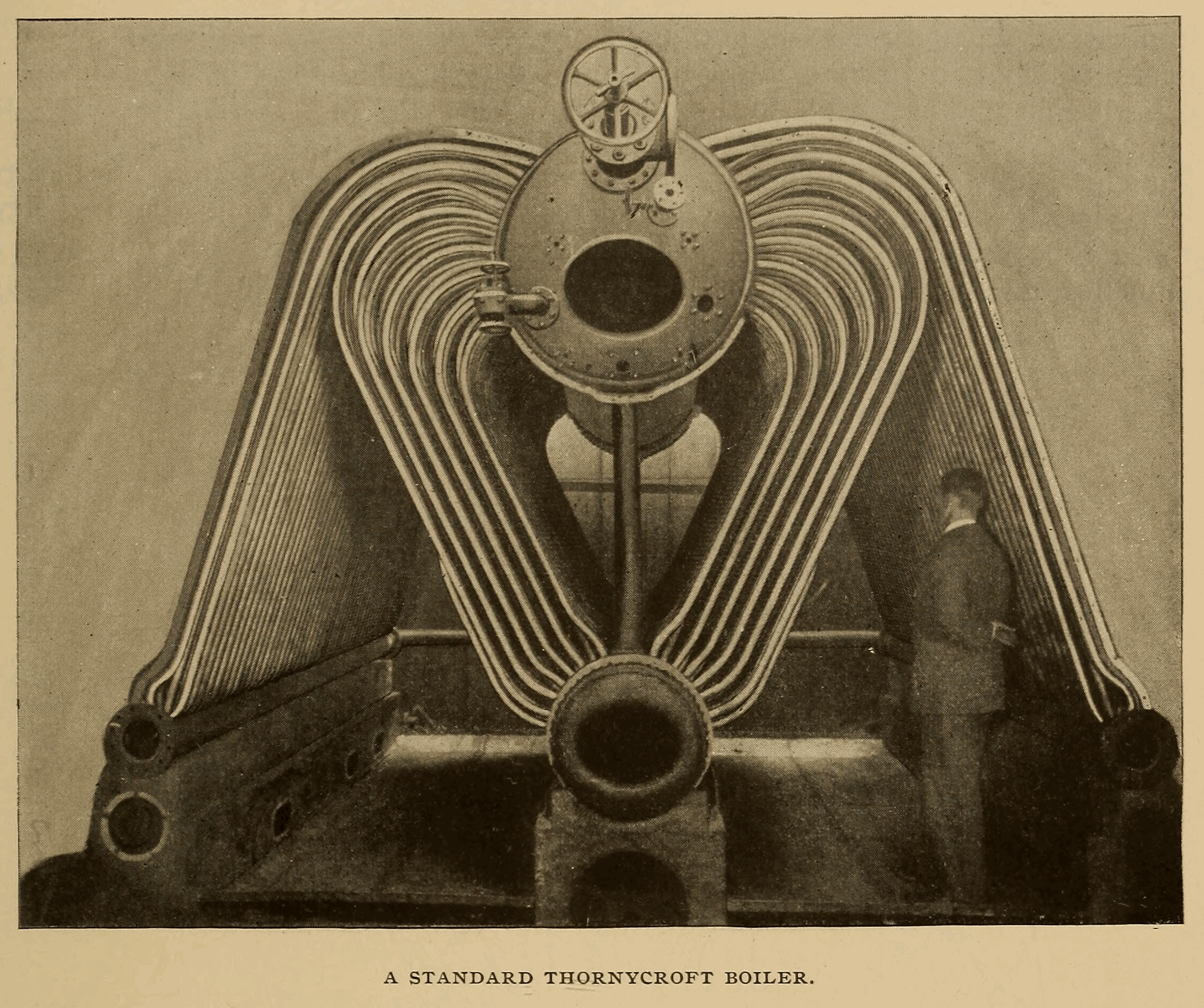
Photo of a Thornycroft watertube boiler, from Cassier's Magazine 1896

== Engineering career ==
The exploits of Miranda gave rise to further orders of similar vessels, including Gitana, built in 1876 and capable of 20.8 knots (38.5 km/h; 23.9 mph), which was an astonishing speed at the time. Besides the yacht sales, Thornycroft found an even more lucrative business building torpedo boats. It started with Rap for Norway in 1873, a light vessel built of thin steel plates. The early torpedo boats were designed for spar torpedoes, but when a new generation of self-propelled torpedoes arrived from Whitehead in 1876, the torpedo boat really found its form. Thornycroft designed HMS Lightning for the Royal Navy, on the lines of Gitana, and orders started mounting. John Thornycroft was not the only supplier of torpedo boats, but his influence was so big that the Encyclopedia of Ships and Shipping characterised him as the founder of the torpedo-boat industry.

The weight of the boiler system (of the locomotive type) precluded speeds over 22–23 knots (41–43 km/h; 25–26 mph), and Thornycroft set out to work on an improved system. Water-tube boilers already existed, and Thornycroft built the river-steamer Peace in 1882 with that type of boilers, of the Herreshoff design. In 1885 his improved system was ready, and it became one of the most important of the 50–60 patents he obtained between 1873 and 1924. Built with the new boilers, the Spanish Ariete reached 26.2 knots (48.5 km/h; 30.2 mph) on trials in 1887, and in 1894 the yard delivered the torpedo gunboat HMS Speedy to the Royal Navy, which was the first ship with water-tube boilers in that Navy.

Like other engineers before and after him, Thornycroft tried to solve the problem of how to reduce rolling in ships. He bought the yacht Cecile of 300 tons and installed a device consisting of a 6-ton moveable watertank, controlled by hydraulic cylinders. John Thornycoft presented his results to the Institution of Naval Architects in 1892, but although his invention was able to dampen rolling, it was not proceeded with.

In 1894, Thornycroft and his employee Sydney W. Barnaby were some of the first to record the effects of cavitation during the tests of the destroyer Daring. The tests revealed that the narrow blade screws of the day ceased to be effective at high speeds, and as a result the screws were replaced by a new wider blade model. The old screws would do 24 knots (44 km/h; 28 mph) at 3,700 indicated horsepower (2,800 kW), while the new ones delivered 28.4 knots (52.6 km/h; 32.7 mph) with the same power.

John Thornycroft entered a new field of business in 1896, when he built a steam-powered lorry for his local Chiswick Urban District, and formed the Thornycroft Steam Carriage and Wagon Company. More followed, and in 1901 he made a breakthrough by winning the War Office's competition for heavy lorries for military use. In 1898 the company opened a new factory for lorries in Basingstoke, and Thornycroft's quickly grew to become the town's largest employer. Later, the company also began building combustion-engine vehicles, and production continued at Basingstoke until 1969.

In his quest for still faster vessels, John Thornycroft made several tests with different hull-shapes, eventually settling on a stepped hull for fast motor boats. This hull shape would almost lift the boat out of the water, facilitating high speeds. In 1910, John I. Thornycroft & Company designed and built a 25 ft (7.6 m) boat called Miranda IV. She was a single-step hydroplane powered by a 120 hp (89 kW) Thornycroft petrol engine and could reach 35 knots (65 km/h). In 1915, John Thornycroft suggested that the Royal Navy might use a fast motor boat – armed with torpedoes – for coastal service, and in January 1916 the company received an order for twelve 40-foot (12 m) boats, which formed the beginning of a long line of Coastal Motor Boats delivered to the Royal Navy and later to other navies also. The Hovercraft Museum holds a number of hull models that John Thornycroft used for his experiments, using air-flow as a mean of lifting boats out of the water. The oldest dates back to 1877.

He was knighted in the 1902 Coronation Honours, receiving the accolade from King Edward VII at Buckingham Palace on 24 October that year.

== Legacy ==
John Thornycroft died in 1928 and was widely commemorated for his inventions and engineering skills. His son John Edward Thornycroft (1872–1960) and grandson John Ward Thornycroft (1899–1989) both served as chairmen of John I. Thornycroft & Company. His daughter Blanche Thornycroft (1873–1950) was heavily involved in the family business and her father's experiments, and continued to test model hulls for the company for at least ten years after her father’s death in 1928.

The Thornycroft company name disappeared from the motoring business in the 1960s and from shipbuilding on 1 November 2001, when Vosper Thornycroft became VT Group plc.
