= Thomas Thornycroft =

English sculptor and engineer (1815-1885)

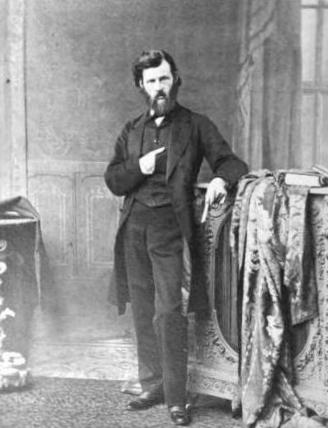
Thomas Thornycroft

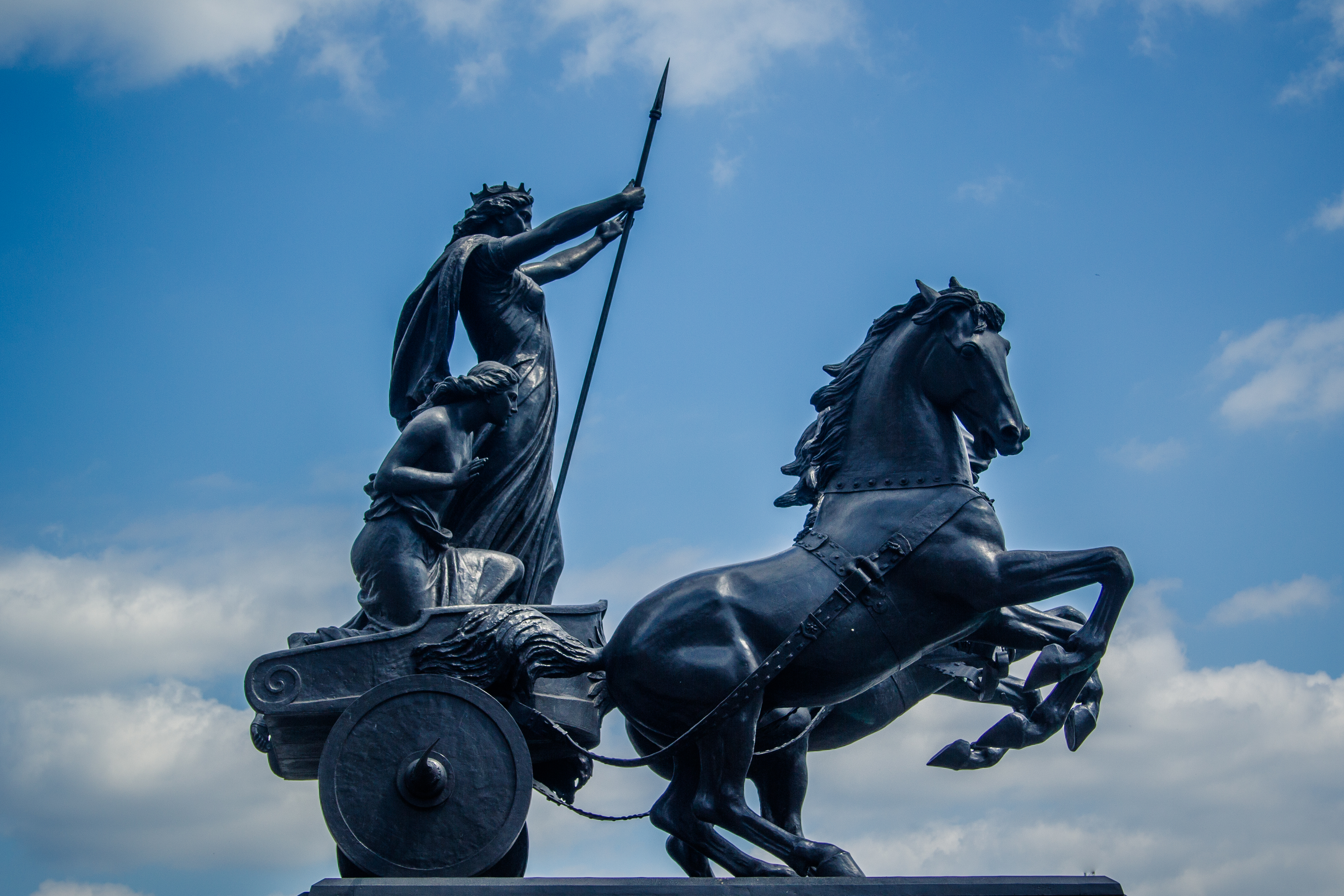
Thomas Thornycroft's statue of Boadicea and her Daughters in London.

Thomas Thornycroft (19 May 1815 – 30 August 1885) was an English sculptor and engineer.

== Biography ==
Thornycroft was born at Great Tidnock, near Gawsworth, Cheshire, the eldest son of John Thornycroft, a farmer. He was educated at Congleton Grammar School and then briefly apprenticed to a surgeon. He moved to London where he spent four years as an assistant to the sculptor John Francis. In 1840 he married Francis' daughter, Mary, who was also a sculptor.

In 1843 he exhibited Medea about to Slay her Children at the exhibition held at Westminster Hall, held to choose sculptors to make works for the new Houses of Parliament. It led to a commission to make two bronze statues of barons who signed the Magna Carta for the House of Lords.

For the Great Exhibition of 1851 Thornycroft made an over-life-sized plaster equestrian statue of Queen Victoria which was much admired by the queen herself and by Prince Albert. He had the royal family's full co-operation in its creation, the queen's horse being sent round to his studio several times during the process. Fifty bronze casts of a statuette based on the plaster, but with the horse's legs in a different position, were commissioned by the Art Union of London to be distributed as prizes between 1854 and 1859.

He made several memorials to Prince Albert following his death in 1861. The first to be completed was an equestrian sculpture at Halifax, unveiled in September 1864. He went on to create similar works for Wolverhampton and Liverpool. The one at Liverpool, commissioned in 1862 but not completed until five years later, was soon paired with an equestrian portrait of Queen Victoria (1869), the pose based on the earlier bronze statuette.

In 1867 Thornycroft was commissioned to make the marble group entitled Commerce for the Albert Memorial in Kensington Gardens in London. He chose to depict the allegorical female figure of Commerce as a civilising influence: she is shown standing on a column, encouraging a young merchant who stands at her side, while a crouching figure brings her corn, and another, bearded and wearing a turban, offers a box of jewels. George Gilbert Scott, the designer of the memorial thought the concept was "too complicated and artificial".

Thornycroft also worked on a monumental representation of Boadicea and Her Daughters, exhibiting a "Colossal head of Boadicea, a part of a chariot group now in progress" in 1864. A short biography published that year said he had already been working on it "at intervals" for many years. The sculpture was not cast in bronze until 1902, 17 years after his death, when it was installed on a plinth on the Victoria Embankment, by Westminster Bridge, London. The figures are shown in a chariot with scythed wheels, drawn by two horses.

He exhibited at the Royal Academy between 1839 and 1874.

In later life Thornycroft worked with his elder son John Isaac Thornycroft (who was to become a shipbuilder) on designs for steam launches, having, in 1864, purchased land by the Thames at Chiswick to use for boat-building.

In 1875, together with Mary and another son, Hamo Thornycroft, he designed the Poets' Fountain, near Hyde Park Corner, London. Other works by Thornycroft are in the Old Bailey and in Westminster Abbey, London. One of his pupils was Thomas Duckett Junior. Through his daughter, Teresa, he was the grandfather of the poet Siegfried Sassoon. Thornycroft died in Brenchley, Kent, and was buried in Chiswick Old Church, Middlesex. His estate was over £11,046.

His other works include:

- Statue of George Benjamin Thorneycroft, first Mayor of Wolverhampton, Wolverhampton (1856).
- Memorial to John Hamilton-Martin in St Michael's Church, Ledbury (1857, with Mary).
- Statue of Richard Grosvenor, 2nd Marquess of Westminster in Grosvenor Park, Chester (1869).

== Bibliography ==
- Bayley, Stephen (1983) [1981]. The Albert Memorial (paperback ed.). London: Scolar Press. ISBN 0-85967-674-9.
- Return of Outdoor Memorials in London. London: London County Council. 1910.
