= Mary Thornycroft =

British sculptor

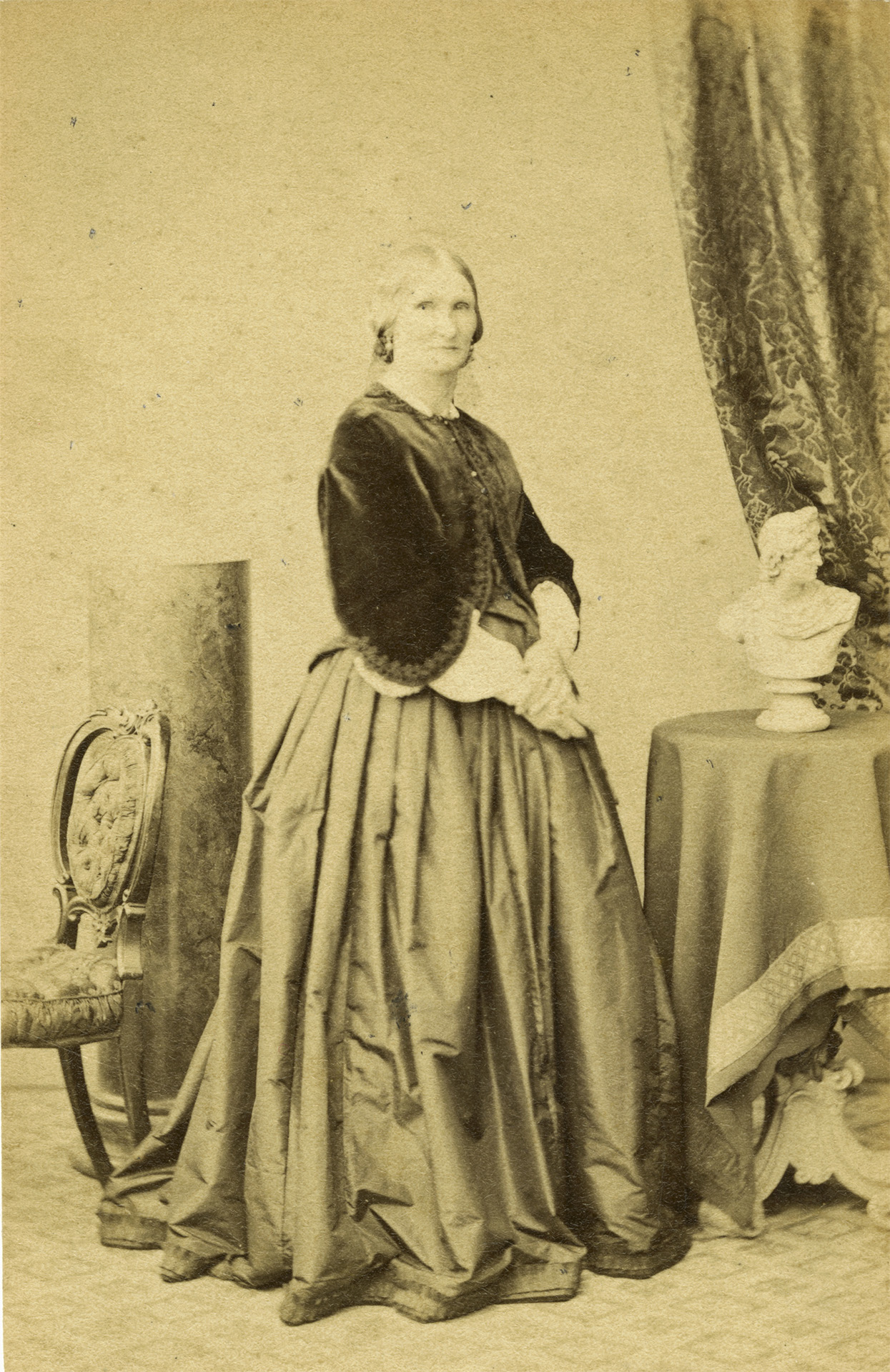
- Mary Thornycroft, 1864, albumen print (carte-de-visite) by Maull & Polybank, Dept. of Image Collections, National Gallery of Art Library, Washington, DC.
- Born: Mary Francis; 1809; Thornham, Norfolk, England
- Died: 1 February 1895 (aged 85–86)
- Occupation: Sculptor
- Spouse: Thomas Thornycroft
- Children: 6, Including: Hamo Thornycroft; John Isaac Thornycroft; Alyce Thornycroft; Helen Thornycroft; Theresa Thornycroft
- Father: John Francis (sculptor)
- Relatives: Siegfried Sassoon (grandson)

Mary Thornycroft (née Francis; 1809 – 1 February 1895) was a British sculptor who sculpted many different busts, fragments and statues. She frequently chose infants and children as her subjects, and was commissioned by Queen Victoria to create a number of statues and portraits of her children and other members of the royal family. Several of these are now in the British Royal Collection.

== Biography ==
The daughter of sculptor John Francis and his wife Mary, Thornycroft was born at Thornham in Norfolk. She studied sculpture under her father, and first exhibited a work, a bust of him, at the Royal Academy in London in 1835, aged 21. Her 1839 exhibition piece, The Orphan Flowergirl received good reviews.

In 1840, she married Thomas Thornycroft, a student of her father. The couple travelled to Italy and lived and worked in Rome for some years. While in Rome, Mary Thornycroft became friends with the sculptors Bertel Thorvaldsen and John Gibson. On her return to London, Gibson recommended her services to Queen Victoria. Gibson's recommendation marked the beginning of a sequence of royal commissions for Thornycroft lasting from 1844 to 1877. These included The Four Seasons, a series of life-size statues of Victoria's children that were much praised and reproduced as engravings and in several art journals. The drawing-room at Osborne House contained nine life-size marble statues of the young princes and princesses that were modeled by Thornycroft. She also created busts of the Queen in 1840, of the Duchess of Gloucester and, in 1846, of the Prince of Wales. Her 1863 bust of Princess Alexandra, Princess of Wales was reproduced in Parian ware for the domestic retail market.

Thornycroft also executed a number of busts of private individuals, as well as a few ideal statues. Among the latter is her figure of a Skipping Girl. She was a regular exhibitor at the Royal Academy from 1835 until 1871 and at the British Institution from 1845 to 1864.

Mary Thornycroft's primary artistic practice was sculpture in marble and sometimes bronze. Her style was naturalistic with details that displayed the personal expressions of her subjects. As a woman her commissions were limited therefore, she capitalized on her craft on subjects that were easily reachable for her to study, notably infants and children. This was an advantage because this is how she gained her notable royal commissions. She worked with her husband on a frequent basis making attribution of individual pieces sometimes difficult. It is known that the couple, along with their son Hamo Thornycroft, worked together during 1875 on The Poets' Fountain at Hyde Park Corner in central London and which was damaged beyond repair in a World War II air raid.

Thornycroft gave sculpting lessons to Princess Louise, who was one of Queen Victoria's daughters and who became a notable sculptor in her own right.

== Family ==
The Thornycrofts had six children who grew to adulthood, two sons (Hamo and John Isaac), and four daughters (Alyce, Theresa, Helen and Frances). Hamo Thornycroft became a sculptor while daughters Alyce Thornycroft, Theresa Thornycroft, and Helen Thornycroft became artists. John Isaac Thornycroft became a marine engineer. The Thornycrofts were the grandparents of Siegfried Sassoon, the war poet, through their daughter Theresa, who married Alfred Ezra Sassoon.

== Selected artworks ==
=== The Four Seasons ===
- Victoria, Princess Royal, as Summer, c. 1846.
- Albert Edward, Prince of Wales, as Winter, c. 1846.
- Prince Alfred as Autumn, c. 1847.
- Princess Alice as Spring c. 1845.

=== Other works ===
- Left hand and arm of Prince Alfred, at seven months, 1845.
- Leg and foot of Prince Alfred, at seven months, 1845.
- Princess Helena, 1848.
- Left hand and arm of Princess Louise, 1848.
- Princess Louise, 1850.
- Bust of Prince Alfred, 1850.
- Hand of Prince Leopold, at six months, 1853.
- Hand of Princess Beatrice, 1859.
- Bust of Princess Alice, 1861.
- Bust of Alexandra, Princess of Wales, 1863.
- Bust of Albert, Duke of Schleswig-Holstein, 1870.
- Bust of Maria, Duchess of Edinburgh, 1876.

=== Full body compositions ===
- Princess Louise, as Plenty, 1855.
- Princess Helena, as Peace, 1856.
- Prince Arthur, as a hunter, 1859.
- Princess Beatrice, reclining in the Nautilus Shell, 1858.
- Prince Leopold, as a fisherman, 1860.
- Princess Louise of Wales, 1877.
- Princesses Victoria and Maud of Wales, 1877.
