= Robert Dolling =

The Reverend Robert Dolling
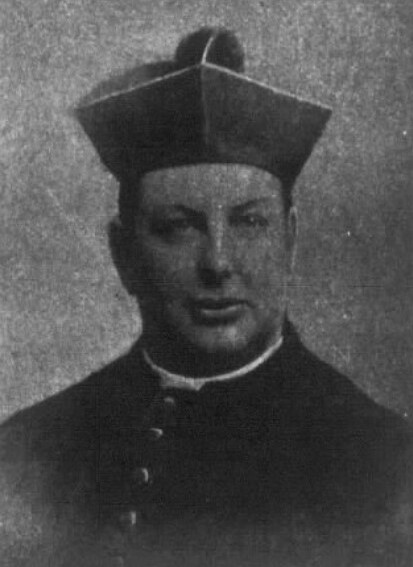
- Born: Robert William Radclyffe Dolling; 10 February 1851; Magheralin, County Down, Ireland
- Died: 15 May 1902 (aged 51); South Kensington, London, England, UK
- Education: Trinity College, Cambridge; Salisbury Theological College

Ecclesiastical career
- Ordained: 1883 (deacon); 1885 (priest)

Robert William Radclyffe Dolling (10 February 1851–15 May 1902), often referred to as Father Dolling, was an Irish Anglo-Catholic priest who served mainly in London and Portsmouth.

== Life ==
Dolling was born on 10 February 1851 at the Old Rectory in Magheralin, County Down, the sixth of nine children and the elder of two sons of Robert Holbeche Dolling and Eliza (née Alexander). His father was a landowner in counties Down and Londonderry, and had served as Sheriff of the City and County of Londonderry. His mother was the third daughter of Josias Alexander MP, a nephew of James Alexander, 1st Earl of Caledon. Dolling spent his early childhood at Kilrea, County Londonderry, where his father had become a land agent.

In 1861, aged ten, Dolling was sent to England to attend a preparatory school at the Grange in Stevenage, Hertfordshire. From 1864 he attended Harrow School and subsequently matriculated at Trinity College, Cambridge, in 1868. However, ill health and an eye condition forced him to leave the university in the spring of 1869, after approximately a year of study. He then spent twelve months travelling in Europe, principally in Italy, including a period in Florence. Following his mother's death in 1870, he returned to Ireland and assisted his father in managing the family estates and land agency.

During his years in Kilrea, Dolling developed an interest in religious and social work. He organised Bible study classes, night schools and social clubs for young people and working men, becoming popular among the local community. His later interest in Anglo-Catholicism was influenced by his friendships with the Anglo-Catholic priests Arthur Stanton and Alexander Mackonochie, whom he had met during his time at Cambridge. Their influence helped draw him towards the movement and its emphasis on ritual in worship. His biographer, the Reverend Charles Edward Osborne, also suggested that Dolling's familiarity with the elaborate sashes, banners and ceremonial practices of the Orange Order during his childhood may have contributed to his later appreciation of vestments and religious ritual.

When his family moved to Dublin in the mid-1870s, Dolling accompanied them. Following his father's death on 28 September 1878, he moved to London, where he became involved in work among the poor in the parish of St Alban's, Holborn. There he developed close friendships with Stanton and Mackonochie, whose defence of ritualistic worship at St Alban the Martyr further influenced his religious outlook.

From 1878 to 1882 Dolling was warden of one of the houses of the Postmen's League, established by Stanton. In 1879 he became warden of its south London branch, undertaking extensive philanthropic and religious work. Although he became popular among the postmen, most of his time was spent working among the poorest communities in Southwark and Holborn, earning their respect and confidence and the affectionate nickname "Brother Bob".

In 1882 Dolling enrolled at Salisbury Theological College to prepare for ordination. He was ordained deacon in 1883 and appointed to a curacy at Corscombe, Dorset. With his vicar's permission, however, he continued to reside in London as head of St Martin's Mission at Holy Trinity, Stepney. He was ordained priest in 1885, but illness and disagreements with the Bishop of London, Frederick Temple, over church organisation and regulations led to his resignation from the mission.

In November 1885 Dolling accepted the charge of St Agatha's, Landport, Portsmouth, a mission in the town's dockyard district established by Winchester College. He remained there for approximately ten years, campaigning to improve conditions in the surrounding impoverished neighbourhood. His work included advocating better wages and working conditions, establishing parish organisations and educational facilities, and providing practical assistance to disadvantaged residents. He also organised regular evening dinners at the vicarage, bringing together people from different backgrounds, including members of parliament and those living in extreme poverty.

During his time at St Agatha's, Dolling raised and spent more than £50,000 on the mission's activities. He established parish social organisations, day schools, a gymnasium and public baths, and oversaw the rebuilding of the church and parsonage in 1895. His approach combined evangelical religious enthusiasm and socially reformist convictions with a strong commitment to Anglo-Catholic ritual, a combination which frequently brought him into conflict with ecclesiastical authorities.

In 1895 Dolling's relationship with the newly appointed Bishop of Winchester, Randall Davidson, deteriorated over the proposed liturgical arrangements at the rebuilt church. Davidson refused to grant him a licence to officiate at the new building because Dolling intended to establish a third altar, particularly for the celebration of requiem masses for the dead. The disagreement resulted in Dolling's resignation from St Agatha's. Despite extensive fundraising, the mission still had an outstanding debt of £3,090 when he left, for which Dolling accepted responsibility. He subsequently cleared the debt through sales of his book and further fundraising.

Dolling's experiences at Landport were recorded in his book Ten Years in a Portsmouth Slum, first published in London in 1896. The work described the social conditions of the district, including poverty, overcrowding, prostitution and the difficulties faced by the local population, as well as his experiences and disagreements with ecclesiastical authorities. During the period following his resignation, he stayed at his sister's home in London but continued working among impoverished communities.

In 1897 Dolling visited the United States, where his emotional and fervent preaching made a considerable impression. William Edward McLaren, the Bishop of Chicago, offered him the position of dean of the city's cathedral, but Dolling declined, having already agreed to become vicar of St Saviour's, Poplar, in the East End of London. He returned to England in 1898 and remained in the post until his death.

At Poplar, Dolling continued his efforts to improve the living conditions of the poor, addressing problems including overcrowding and inadequate housing. These difficulties were particularly severe during the smallpox epidemic of 1901, and the demands of his work further undermined his health. He died on 15 May 1902 at the home of his sister Elise in South Kensington, London. He was buried at Woking Cemetery following requiem masses. Dolling never married.

In 1903 his friends and supporters established a memorial annuity in his name and opened a seaside rest home at Worthing, Sussex, for girls from Poplar and St Agatha's. The establishment was managed by his sisters Elise and Geraldine Dolling, who had themselves been closely involved in his charitable work.

== Bibliography ==
- Ten Years in a Portsmouth Slum. London: Swan Sonnenschein & Co. 1896.

== See also ==
- Alexander Mackonochie
