= Gladstone Memorial, London =

Statue in Westminster, London

Coordinates: 51.513°N 0.1145°W

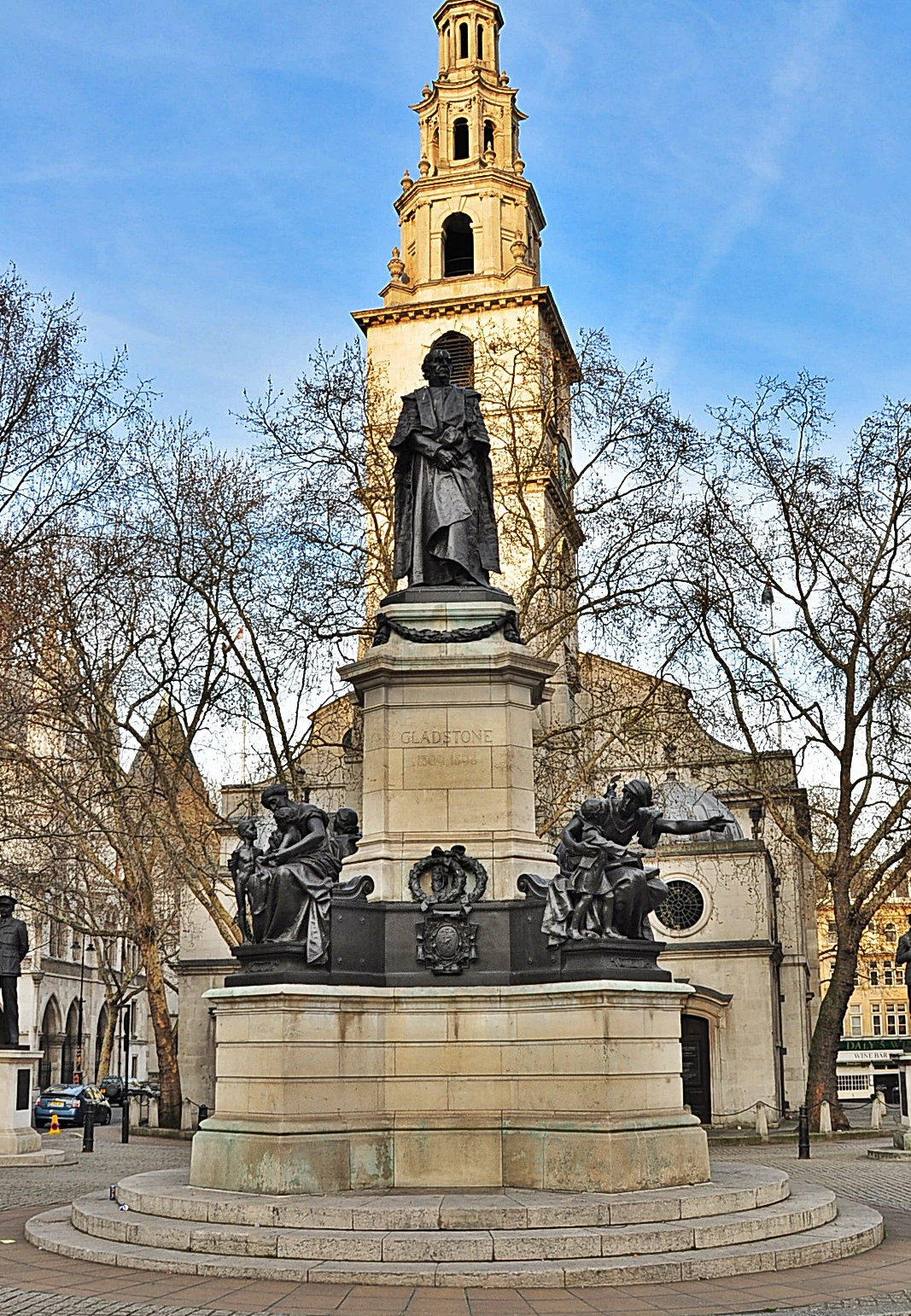
- The memorial in front of St Clement Danes
- Artist: Hamo Thornycroft
- Completion date: 1905
- Type: Statue
- Medium: Bronze
- Subject: William Ewart Gladstone
- Dimensions: 3.4 m (11 ft)
- Location: The Strand; London; England; United Kingdom

Listed Building – Grade II
- Official name: Statue of W E Gladstone on island in road, Strand, WC2
- Designated: 24 February 1958
- Reference no.: 1237098

The Gladstone Memorial on the Strand, London is a bronze sculpture of the British statesman, created by Hamo Thornycroft between 1899-1905. The statue was erected as the national memorial to Gladstone and shows him in the robes of the Chancellor of the Exchequer. The figure stands on a plinth surrounded by allegorical figures depicting four of the Virtues, Courage, Brotherhood, Education and Aspiration. The memorial is a Grade II listed structure.

== History ==
William Ewart Gladstone (1809-1898) served four terms as Prime Minister of the United Kingdom between 1868 and 1894. One of outstanding political figures of Victorian England, he sought to reform the electoral franchise through the Representation of the People Act 1884 and the introduction of secret ballots; pursued free trade and attempted to "pacify Ireland" through Home Rule. Although personally opposed to imperial expansion, his terms of office saw major foreign engagements including the death of General Gordon at Khartoum, the Mahdist War and the outbreak of the First Boer War.

Following Gladstone’s death in 1898, a committee was established to raise funds for a national memorial. The commission was given to Hamo Thornycroft. Born into a family of sculptors, by the 1880s Thornycroft had established his own reputation as a distinguished artist. He had already received commissions for commemorative sculptures around Westminster, including statues of Oliver Cromwell, outside the House of Commons, and General Gordon in Trafalgar Square. (Note: The statue of Gordon was moved to safety at Mentmore Towers during the Second World War, and was re-sited in Victoria Embankment Gardens in the 1950s.) The commission took Thornycroft six years and the statue was not finally unveiled until 1906. The unveiling ceremony was conducted by John Morley, a member of Gladstone's Cabinets and his biographer. The cost was £8,000.

=== Reception ===
The critic Edmund Gosse wrote to congratulate Thornycroft after the memorial's completion; "It is so dignified, so solid and the head so magnificent; you have got that look of frenzy in the eye that all his best portraits have". (Note: Gosse's letter continued; “It always seems to me that if Gladstone had ever had the leisure to take up madness as a profession, he might have been a first class lunatic".) Simon Bradley, in the 2003 revised version London 6: Westminster of the Pevsner Buildings of England series, describes the statue as a "fine, robed figure". The sculpture is a Grade II listed structure.

== Description ==
The statue is executed in bronze and is 3.35 metres (11.0 ft) high. It stands on a plinth of Portland stone by John Lee. Gladstone is depicted in the robes of the Chancellor of the Exchequer. (Note: Gladstone served four terms as Chancellor of the Exchequer, the latter two while also holding the office of Prime Minister.) An inscription on the front of the plinth reads "GLADSTONE 1809-1898". Allegorical statues of women, mostly with children, surround the base, representing four of the Virtues, Courage, Brotherhood, Education and Aspiration.

== Setting ==
The memorial stands at the east end of the Strand, in front of the Church of St Clement Danes. It was originally encircled by the roadway, but is now in a pedestrianised plaza. The plaza also has late-20th century sculptures of Air Chief Marshal Hugh Dowding, and Marshall of the Royal Air Force Arthur Harris, St Clement's being the Royal Air Force church.

== Sources ==
- Blackwood, John (1989). London's Immortals: The Complete Outdoor Commemorative Statues. London: Savoy Press. ISBN 0-9514296-0-4. OCLC 21328602.
- Bradley, Simon; Pevsner, Nikolaus (2003). London 6: Westminster. Pevsner Buildings of England. New Haven, US and London: Yale University Press. ISBN 978-0-300-09595-1. OCLC 888638928.
- Darke, Jo (1991). The Monument Guide to England and Wales: A National Portrait in Bronze and Stone. London: MacDonald and Co. ISBN 978-0-356-17609-3. OCLC 24698831.
