= Owen Le Patourel Franklin =

English composer and organist

Owen Le Patourel Franklin FRCO, ARAM (14 August 1905 – July 1979) was an English composer and organist based in Doncaster and Ascot.

== Life ==
He was born in London. His father was Ralph Walter Franklin, a dealer in leather canvas goods, and his mother was Bertha Laine Le Patourel from whom he gained his middle name. He was educated at Tollington School and Taunton School. He won the Hubert Kiver Prize at the Royal Academy of Music in 1923.

He was sub-professor of the Royal Academy of Music 1928–1929. He married Doris Mary Abey. They had one son, Derek Owen, born 12 April 1933. He served in the Royal Navy from 1941 - 1946. Whilst in York from 1946 to 1947 he was the conductor of the York Symphony Orchestra.

== Appointments ==
- Organist at St. Alban's Church, Holborn 1925–1928
- Assistant organist at York Minster 1929–1941, and 1946
- Organist at St. George's Church, Doncaster 1946–1957
- Organist at Ascot Parish Church 1957–1975

== Compositions ==
He wrote some anthems and a set of responses.
