= Statue of Alfred the Great, Winchester =

Statue in Winchester, England

Statue of Alfred the Great
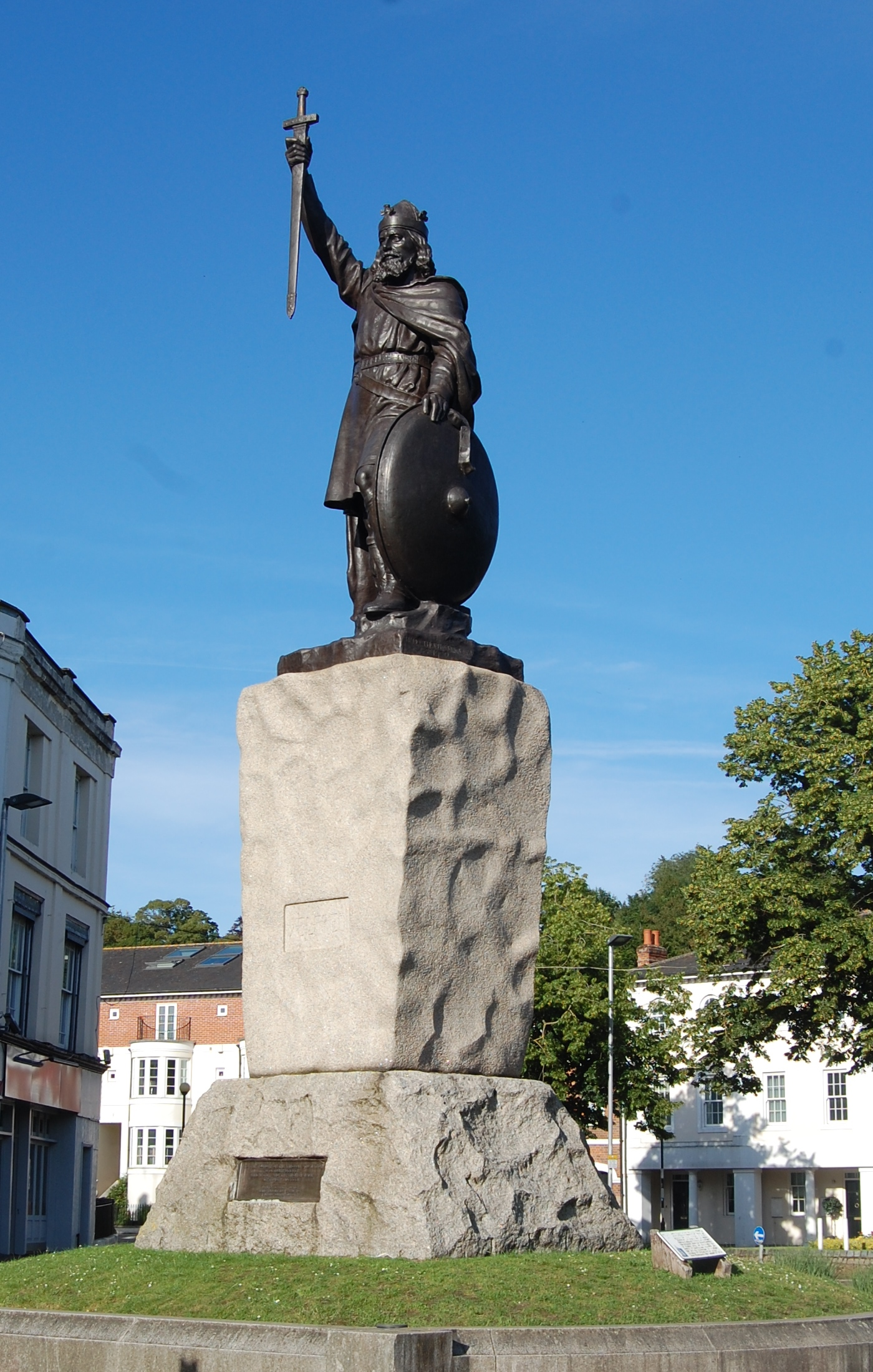
- Completion date: 1901
- Medium: Sculpture
- Subject: Alfred the Great
- Location: Winchester, England, United Kingdom

The Statue of Alfred the Great is located in the centre of Winchester, England. It was commissioned in 1899 as part of the celebrations of the millennium since the death of Alfred the Great, the King of the West Saxons and the first King of the Anglo-Saxons and by convention the first English monarch and founder of Kingdom of England. Designed by the Royal Academician Hamo Thornycroft, it was completed in 1901.

It is located on The Broadway, a continuation of the High Street which runs through the centre of the city. It is close to the roundabout linking with Eastgate Street and Bridge Street across the River Itchen. Winchester Guildhall is located nearby. The statue has been Grade II listed since 1950.

== Bibliography ==
- Hill, Paul. The Kingdom of the Anglo-Saxons: The Wars of King Alfred 865–899. Pen and Sword Military, 2022.
- Lawson, Tom. God and War: The Church of England and Armed Conflict in the Twentieth Century. Routledge, 2016.
- Manco, Jean. The Origins of the Anglo-Saxons: Decoding the Ancestry of the English. Thames & Hudson, 2022.
- Niles, John D. The Idea of Anglo-Saxon England 1066-1901: Remembering, Forgetting, Deciphering, and Renewing the Past. John Wiley & Sons, 2015.
