= Arthur Stanton (priest) =

English Anglo-Catholic priest (1869–1913)

The Reverend Arthur Stanton
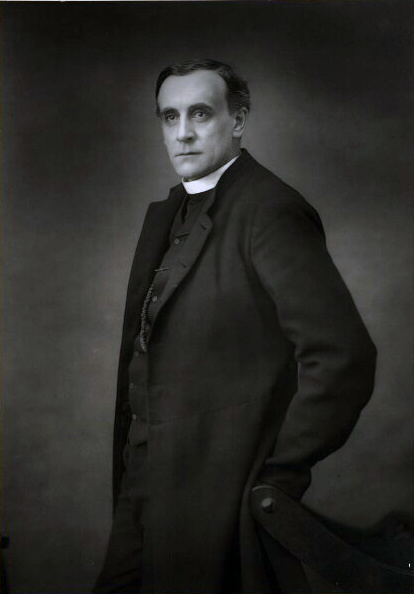
- Stanton in 1890
- Born: Arthur Henry Stanton; 21 June 1839; Upfield, England
- Died: 28 March 1913 (aged 73); Upfield, England
- Education: Trinity College, Oxford; Ripon College Cuddesdon
- Religion: Christianity (Anglican)
- Church: Church of England
- Ordained: 1862 (deacon); 1864 (priest)
- Congregations served: St Alban's Church, Holborn

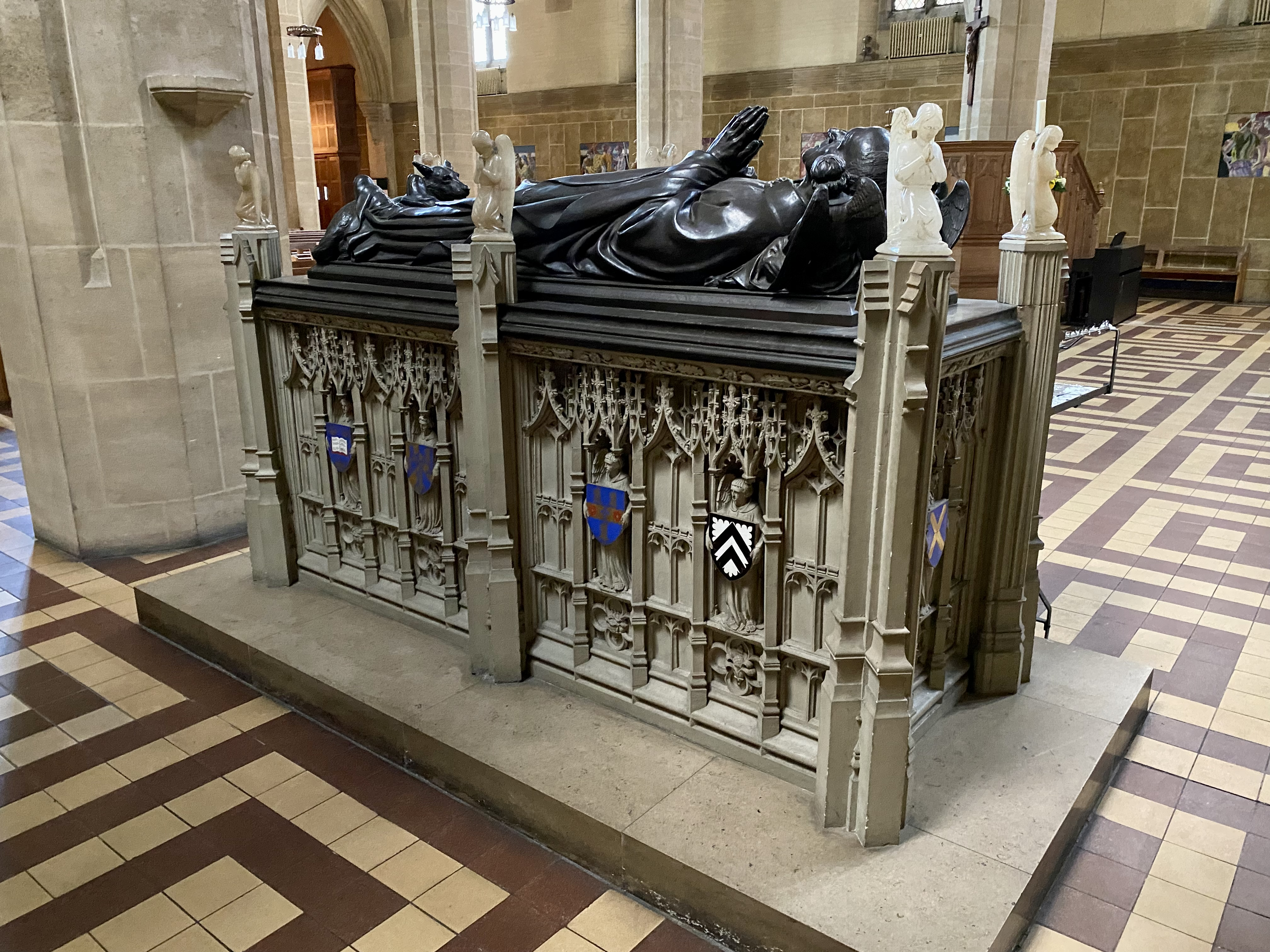
Stanton's memorial in St Alban's Church, Holborn. Sculpted 1913 by Hamo Thornycroft.

Arthur Henry Stanton (1839–1913) was an English Anglo-Catholic priest in the latter decades of the 19th and early 20th centuries.

== Life ==
Born on 21 June 1839, he was educated at Rugby and Trinity College, Oxford, and ordained after a period of study at Cuddesdon Theological College in 1862. His only post was as Curate at St Alban's, Holborn, 1862–1913. Stanton was an indefatigable champion of the poor, staunch champion of rituals, and exuberant preacher. He attracted devoted supporters and horrified critics in equal measure. In 1877, he founded a society for postmen, the Saint Martin's League. At the end of his life he was offered, and rejected, a prebendal stall in St Paul's Cathedral.

== Death ==
Following his death on 28 March 1913, his funeral took place on 1 April 1913. Fellow clergy escorted his coffin as it was carried on a wheeled bier through the crowded streets from his Holborn church to the London Necropolis railway station, Waterloo for transport to Brookwood Cemetery near Woking where a crowd of 1,000 had assembled for his interment.
