= Thomas Adams (organist, born 1857) =

Composer and organist

Thomas Adams FRCO
- photographed for Church Bells (1895)
- Born: 1857
- Died: 4 November 1918 (aged 60–61)
- Occupations: Organist; Composer
- Organizations: St Mary's Church, Matching; Bishop's Stortford Grammar School; St Andrew's Church, Halstead; St Alban's Church, Holborn

Thomas Adams, FRCO (1857-1918) was a noted English composer and was organist at the parish church of St Alban's Church, Holborn in London from 1888 until his death. He was a prolific composer of anthems, oratorios and organ music. His published work (mainly by Novello) includes the oratorio The Story of Calvary and The Holy Child.
