= Daniel Gonzalez (spree killer) =

English murderer

- Born: Daniel Julian Gonzalez; 21 June 1980; Frimley Park Hospital, Frimley, Surrey, England
- Died: 9 August 2007 (aged 27); Broadmoor Hospital, Crowthorne, Berkshire, England
- Cause of death: Suicide by exsanguination
- Other names: Zippy; The Freddy Krueger Killer; The Mummy's Boy Killer
- Conviction: Murder
- Penalty: Life imprisonment

Details
- Date: September 15–17, 2004
- Locations: London and Sussex, England
- Killed: 4
- Injured: 2
- Weapon: Knife
- Date apprehended: 17 September 2004

Daniel Julian Gonzalez (21 June 1980 – 9 August 2007), also known as the Freddy Krueger Killer and the Mummy's Boy Killer, was a British spree killer who murdered four people and injured two others over two days across London and Sussex in September 2004.

Gonzalez was inspired by horror films such as A Nightmare on Elm Street and Friday the 13th to become a "famous serial killer". In a drug-fuelled stabbing spree, he attacked the elderly and infirm, writing about his experiences in letters to himself as "Zippy", his past nickname. In his letters, he wrote of how much he enjoyed the murders "one of the best things I've done in my life", and how similar he was to the character Freddy Krueger.

Gonzalez's mother, Lesley Savage, had previously written a letter to her MP outlining the difficulties obtaining mental health care for her son. In her letter, she asked "does my son have to commit murder to get help?"

He was jailed for life in 2006, and committed suicide in Broadmoor Hospital the following year.

== Early life ==
Daniel Gonzalez, who had an English mother and Spanish father, was educated at Gordon's School, a state-run boarding school in West End, Woking, Surrey. His parents separated in 1986 when he was six years old. Gonzalez left school with eight GCSEs and was known to be a good actor, a chess champion, but also a "dark and troubled boy." From the age of 17, Gonzalez received care because of his psychological problems and was treated by specialist mental health teams. By the age of 24, he was unemployed and using drugs. He spent all his time playing computer games and watching horror films.

== Victims ==
On 15 September 2004, Gonzalez told 61-year-old Peter King, who was walking his dog with his wife in Hilsea, Portsmouth, that he was going to kill him. He was fought off and fled to Hove, where he stabbed 76-year-old Marie Harding while wearing a hockey mask, similar to the character Jason Voorhees in the movie Friday the 13th. When the mask was taken in for evidence, it had Harding's DNA on it. After killing Harding, he returned to his home in Woking.

Two days later, on 17 September 2004, Gonzalez travelled to Tottenham. At 05:30, he killed 46-year-old Kevin Molloy by stabbing him in the face, neck and torso with a pair of large knives he had stolen from a department store. At 07:00 he forced entry into the Hornsey house of Koumis Constantino, but was fought off after stabbing his arm. By 08:00 he was in Highgate, where he randomly tried to gain access to houses. He murdered elderly couple Derek and Jean Robinson, an experience which he claimed was "orgasmic".

== Arrest and trial ==
Gonzalez was arrested on 17 September 2004 at Tottenham Court Road Underground station after a decorator, who had seen him running naked and covered in blood from the Robinsons' house, reported him to police. Before his trial, while held at Broadmoor Hospital, Berkshire, Gonzalez tried to bite himself to death and was so violent that he was accompanied everywhere by officers in riot gear.

At the trial, Gonzalez tried to claim that he was not guilty by reason of insanity, although this was rejected. He was given six life sentences, with the trial judge recommending that he should never be released.

== Death ==
After his arrest, Gonzalez attempted to commit suicide by biting through an artery in his arm. "I have never seen anyone bite himself with that ferocity," said the doctor who treated his wound. He survived but committed suicide in his room in Broadmoor Hospital, on 9 August 2007, by cutting himself with the edges of a broken CD case.
