= Statue of Queen Victoria, Karachi =

Statue in Frere Hall, Karachi

Statue of Queen Victoria
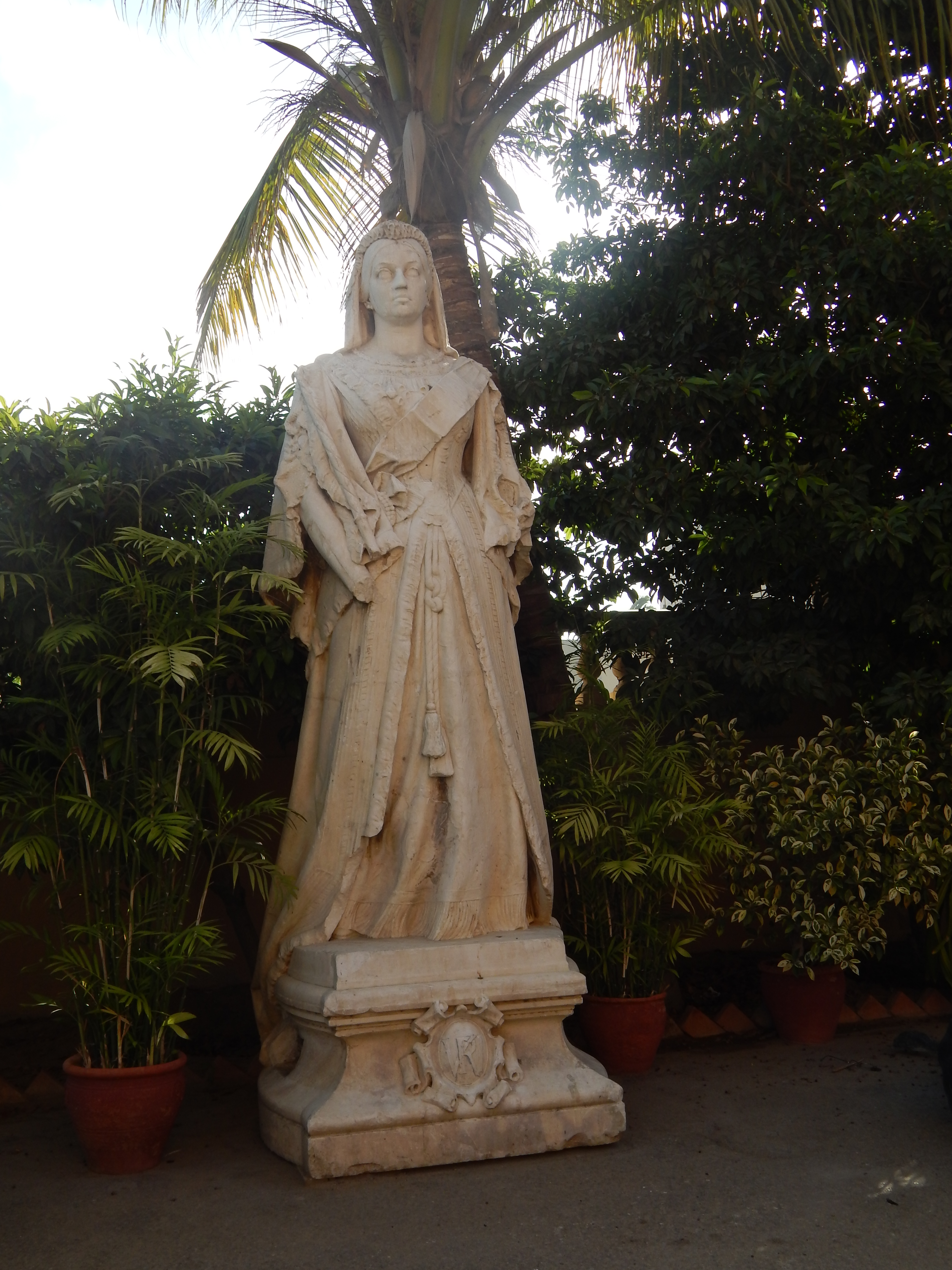
- Artist: Sir Hamo Thornycroft
- Year: 1902; 124 years ago
- Type: Sculpture
- Medium: Marble
- Subject: Queen Victoria
- Location: Karachi, Pakistan

The statue of Queen Victoria in Frere Hall, Karachi, Pakistan, is a work by the sculptor Sir Hamo Thornycroft. The statue was removed in 1962 on the order of president from Frere Hall.

It is now housed in Mohatta Palace, Karachi.

== History ==
The statue was commissioned in 1902 at a cost of £6,000. It was shipped in 1905 and installed by the King George V.

The statue was made by sculptor Hamo Thornycroft with marble. The statue remained in Frere Hall. In 1962, it was removed by order of then-president Ayub Khan.

== See also ==
- List of statues of Queen Victoria
