= Gordon's School =

British secondary educational institution

Location
- West End Woking, Surrey, GU24 9PT; England; 51°20′37″N 0°38′47″W

Information
- Former name: The Gordon Boys' Home, The Gordon Boys' School
- Type: Academy; Day and boarding school
- Motto: Semper fidelis (Always faithful)
- Religious affiliations: Non-denominational with an Anglican Chapel and Chaplain
- Patron saint: Reigning Monarch of the United Kingdom
- Established: 1885; 141 years ago
- Founder: By public subscription, at the express wish of Queen Victoria, as the National Memorial to General Gordon
- Local authority: Surrey
- Department for Education URN: 139151 Tables
- Ofsted: Reports
- Chair: Jane Valner
- Headmaster: Andrew Moss
- Gender: Mixed
- Age: 11 to 18
- Enrolment: 979 (2025)
- Houses: 6 Day and 5 Residential Boarding
- Colours: Green & Yellow
- Affiliation: Gordon Foundation; an independent charitable trust established in 1888 Registered charity no. 312092, Charity Commission for England and Wales
- Alumni: gordonians.co.uk
- Website: www.gordons.school

Gordon's School is a secondary school with Academy (English school) status in West End, near Woking, Surrey, England. Founded in 1885, it was originally named The Gordon Boys' Home. It converted from being a voluntary aided school to an Academy on 1 January 2013.

Gordon's School is one of 27 state boarding schools in England. Of Gordon's c.1000 pupils just over a quarter board overnight.

In October 2024, Ofsted ranked the school as outstanding across all categories. In June 2022, Gordon's was judged Boarding School of the Year by the TES (Times Educational Supplement). The Real Schools Guide 2025, recognised Gordon's School as one of the top schools in the country.

Gordon's School is a member of The Boarding Schools Association, The Heads' Conference (HMC), and listed in The Good Schools Guide.

In 2014, controversy arose over the school charging £10,494 a year for day-pupil places. It was argued that made the state school selective, along with others which charge similar fees. Under the Education Act 1996 it is illegal for state schools to charge for admission or education provided during school hours, but they may charge for activities outside normal school teaching hours.

Gordon's School students may apply to The Gordon Foundation 1885 Bursary Fund for help with these charges.

== History ==
The school was founded, in 1885, by public subscription as The Gordon Boys' Home, as the National Memorial to General Gordon of Khartoum, an officer of the Corps of Royal Engineers, who had been killed in 1885.

Initially known as The Gordon Boys' Home, a home for underprivileged boys, it quickly became a boys' boarding school.

The story of how Gordon's School was established is recounted in the book, The Gordon Heritage: Story of General Gordon and the Gordon Boys' School by Lieutenant Colonel Derek Boyd of the Royal Engineers.

It details how the idea for The Gordon Boys' Home came from Queen Victoria, who later became the home's first patron; the reigning monarch of the United Kingdom has been the patron of what is now Gordon's School ever since.

The first commandant of the home/school was Major General Henry Tyndall, CB, ex 2nd Punjab Infantry, and its original location was Fort Wallington, Fareham, Hampshire. The home/school transferred to its current location, in West End, Woking, Surrey, in 1887.

The objective of the home/school was to teach necessitous boys aged between 13-17 a variety of practical trades including carpentry, shoemaking, tailoring, gardening, engineering, cooking and blacksmithing, with the aim of helping them to find future civil employment or to secure a place serving in the armed forces.

Regular military style drills, marches and parades instilled discipline in the boys. Signalled by bugle calls, the same as those used in the army, the boys would be called to meals, marches, post collection points and parades.

The early full dress consisted of tartan trousers, a dark blue jersey embroidered with G.B.H. and a Glengarry cap with plaid band and Gordon badge.

A ranking system was also enforced within the home, again similar to that of the army, including positions such as L/Cpl, Cpl, Sgt and finally Colour Sgt.

The Gordon Boys' Home colour (flag) was donated by Dr Hope of Chobham, who was the home's doctor, and presented by Lady Elphinstone, in 1895.

In 1888, the Gordon Foundation was established as an independent charitable trust to provide financial support for pupils in need. In 1990, the first girls were admitted.

In 1959, a statue of General Gordon astride a camel was shipped back from Sudan to Gordon's School. It has overlooked the main playing fields ever since. During the Summer of 2014 the statue underwent a full renovation which was unveiled by Prince Edward, Earl of Wessex (now Duke of Edinburgh).

Another notable Statue of General Gordon stands on a stone plinth in the Victoria Embankment Gardens, in London. These statues are two of several memorials to the Victorian war hero.

In the First World War, 136 former pupils of Gordon's School lost their lives serving their country. Their names are inscribed on a memorial tablet in the school's chapel and they are commemorated by a plaque at St George's Memorial Church, Ypres.

Today, the school continues the tradition of ceremony and parade. All students learn to march during weekly drills and are loaned a ceremonial uniform, similar to that worn by the original Gordon Boys, for the c. eight public parades which are held each year.

== Student body ==
Gordon's is now a co-educational Academy school, and the pupils are a mixture of day, and full and weekly boarders. Residential boarding services at Gordon's School were judged by Ofsted in 2024 to be outstanding in all categories of boarding.

== Facilities ==
=== Site ===
Gordon's School is set in over 50 acres (202, 243 m^{2}) of countryside, in Surrey Heath; facilities include playing fields for a wide range of sports.

=== Buildings ===
The central building on the south side of the Parade Ground is the Assembly Hall and Reception building. Designed in the Gothic Revival style, by William Butterfield, it was completed in 1887.

Opened in 1894, the Memorial School Chapel of St Edward the Confessor, was built at the request of Queen Victoria, in memory of her grandson, the eldest son of Edward, Prince of Wales (later Edward VII), Prince Albert Victor, Duke of Clarence and Avondale, who had helped fundraise for the boys' home.

A Grade II listed building, it has a four bay cruciform pan and was also designed by William Butterfield in the same Gothic Revival style.

All the school buildings, including the boarding and day houses, are named after people or places associated with General Gordon.

In 2023, the Prince Edward, Earl of Wessex (now Duke of Edinburgh) officially opened the school's new Sports Hub which incorporates a sports hall, all-weather pitch, changing rooms and café for use by both students and the local community.

== Curriculum ==
Like all maintained schools and many other academies, Gordon's School follows the National Curriculum, and is inspected by Ofsted on how well this is delivered.

Schools endeavour to get all students to achieve the English Baccalaureate (EBACC) qualification — this must include core subjects, a modern or ancient foreign language, and either History or Geography.

== Extracurricular activities ==
=== Pipes and Drums Band ===
Since 1885, Gordon's School has had a marching Pipes and Drums band, comprising approximately 60 members, including c. 30 bagpipers alongside, snare drummers, tenor drummers and bass drummers.

Every January, as part of the school's Memorial Weekend, the school marching band leads students along Whitehall, London, to the statue of General Gordon, in the Victoria Embankment Gardens.

As well as taking part in the Scottish Schools Pipe Band Championships, members of the Pipes and Drums also perform each year at the Last Post Association Ceremonies held at the Menin Gate, Ypres, Belgium, and Brookwood, Woking, UK.

In 2014, the band and dancers also performed at Westminster Abbey to celebrate Commonwealth Day. Queen Elizabeth II and Prince Philip, Duke of Edinburgh attended the service accompanied by other members of the Royal Family.

In 2022, the school formed a partnership with the National Piping Centre, which provides scholarship lessons for the School's appointed Piping Scholars and other extra tuition opportunities.

In 2017, the then Pipes and Drums bandmaster, Cecil McCready, was sentenced to 12 months in prison for three counts of sexual assault with a child by a person in a position of trust. McCready, a retired Irish Guard, had worked at the school for 17 years before his arrest.

=== Model United Nations (MUN) ===
Gordon's School is one of just a few state schools to participate in Model United Nations (MUN), hosting an annual MUN Conference and attending events hosted by other schools in the UK and abroad throughout the year.

=== Sports ===
In October 2020, Gordon's School formed a partnership with Harlequins Rugby Football Club to provide students aged 16 to 18 with the opportunity to train in a professional rugby environment. The program is designed to develop emerging rugby talent and is endorsed by the Rugby Football Union.

=== Creative Arts ===
Gordon's School aspires to attain the designation of an All Steinway School. This initiative aims to provide students with access to high-quality instruments and opportunities to participate in Steinway-sponsored masterclasses and events.

Gordon's School stages two musical productions a year. Notable recent shows include Charlie and the Chocolate Factory (2025). Past productions include: Oliver! (2024), Sweet Charity (2024); Made in Dagenham (2023); Mary Poppins (2023) and Beauty and the Beast (2022).

== Notable alumni ==
- Ellie Boatman (attended Gordon's School 2013-2015), England and Ealing Trailfinders professional Rugby Union player. Ellie was in the Great Britain Women's Rugby Sevens Team that claimed gold at the 2023 European Games, in Poland, securing their place at the 2024 Summer Olympics, Paris.
- Hannah Russell (attended Gordon's School 2007-2012), British Paralympic silver medallist in 2012 Summer Paralympic Games and World Champion at 2013 IPC Swimming Championships in Montreal, Quebec, Canada. Double Gold medallist and world-record breaker in the Rio de Janeiro Paralympics 2016. Gold medallist in the Tokyo 2020 Paralympic Games.
- Eboni Usoro-Brown (nee Beckford-Chambers), (attended Gordon's School from 2001–2004) England and Bath Netball Player, won a gold medal for England at the 2018 Gold Coast Commonwealth Games.
- Daniel Gonzalez (spree killer) (attended Gordon's School 1991-1996), a former boarding pupil who murdered four victims and attempted to murder two others in September 2004; sentenced to life imprisonment in 2006, he cited horror films he had seen at a young age as inspiration for his crimes.
