= Saint Martin's League =

Saint Martin's League was a devotional society in the Church of England for letter carriers. It was founded in 1877 by Arthur Henry Stanton at the Church of St Alban the Martyr, Holborn. Its stated object was "Love to God and Man."

To God: by endeavouring to lead good lives.
To Man: by having at heart the common brotherhood of humanity, and trying to live up to the principles of fraternity.
This being interpreted, meant: To provide for London letter-carriers and sorters, houses of rest where they could sleep, eat, or read in quiet.

The League's patrons were John Manners, 7th Duke of Rutland and Richard William Church. It was active until 1902.
