= Statue of General Gordon =

Statue by Hamo Thornycroft in London

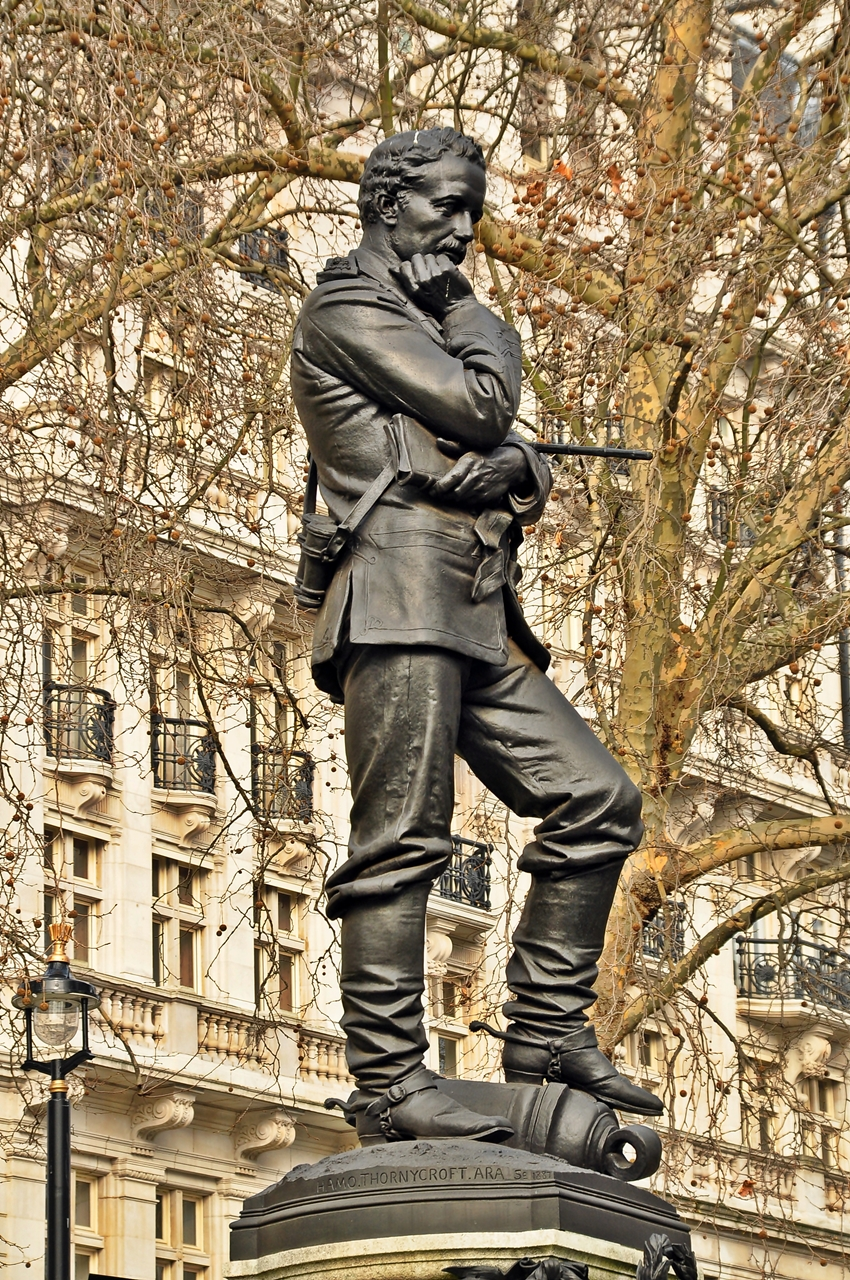
Statue of General Gordon on the Victoria Embankment in London (detail)

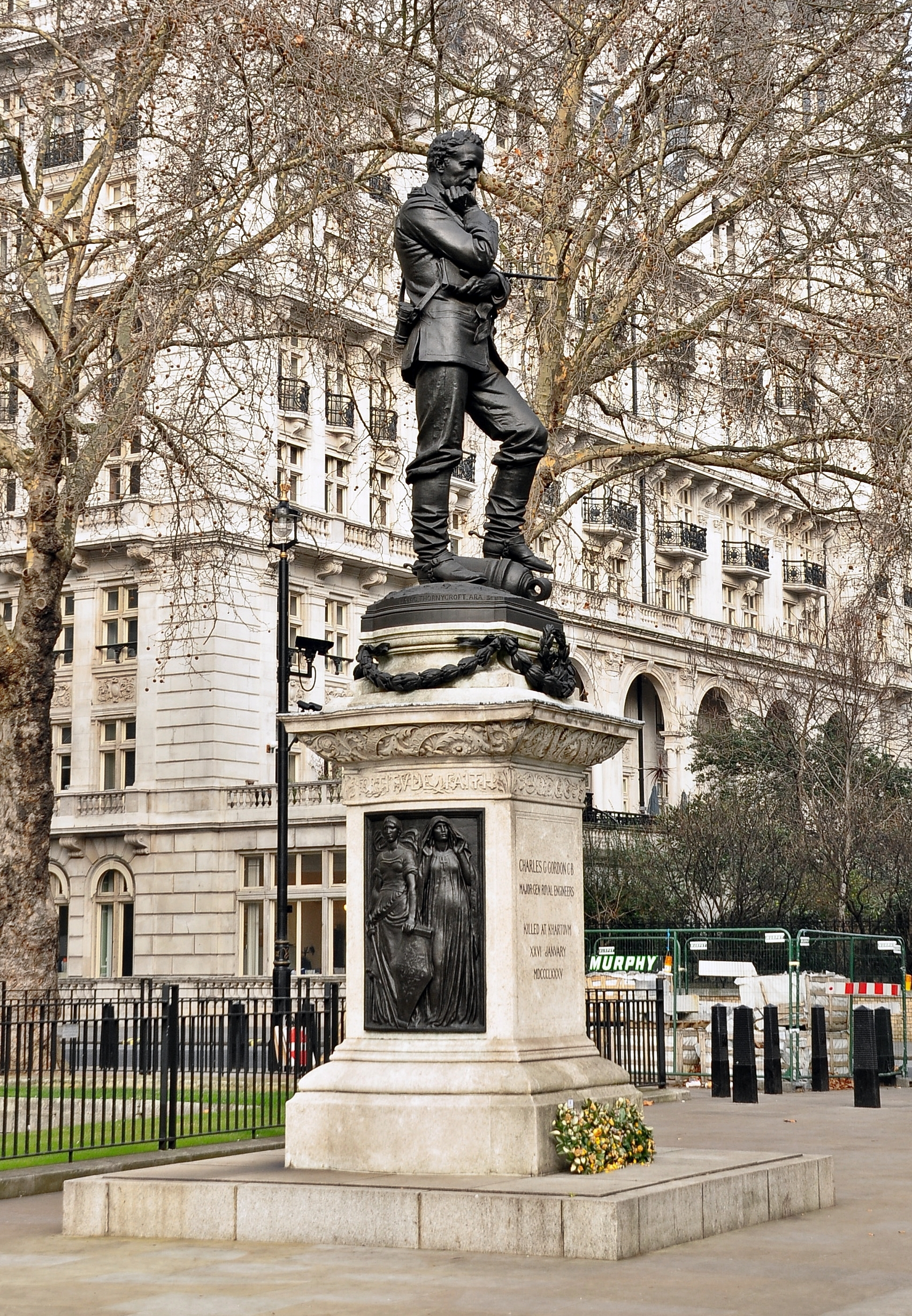
Statue of General Gordon on its shortened plinth at the Victoria Embankment in London

A bronze statue of General Charles George Gordon by Hamo Thornycroft stands on a stone plinth in the Victoria Embankment Gardens in London. It has been Grade II listed since 1970. A similar statue stands at Gordon Reserve, near Parliament House in Melbourne, Australia, on its original tall plinth.

A different memorial statue by Edward Onslow Ford, depicting Gordon on a camel, stands at Brompton Barracks, Chatham, with another formerly in Khartoum and now at Gordon's School near Woking. There are further memorial statues to Gordon in Aberdeen; in Gravesham, where the full length stone statue depicts Gordon in his army uniform with a sabre; and there is a Grade II listed monument to Gordon in Southampton.

== Background ==
Major-General Gordon was lionised as a British war hero after his death at the end of the Siege of Khartoum in January 1885. The statue was made in 1887–88. Gordon's brother, Sir Henry Gordon, advised Thornycroft to minimise the military character of the statue, and emphasis Gordon's qualities of strength of mind, love, kindness and affection.

The original statue in London was first unveiled in Trafalgar Square on 16 October 1888 without a formal ceremony. It was sited halfway between the two fountains in Trafalgar Square, standing on a 18 feet (5.5 m) high pedestal. The statue was removed from Trafalgar Square in 1943 and moved to the grounds of Mentmore Towers in Buckinghamshire.

In a speech in the House of Commons speech 5 May 1948, Winston Churchill (then Leader of the Opposition) advocated a return of the statue to its original location. In the event, it was reinstalled on a lower plinth in 1953, about half a mile to the southeast, on the Victoria Embankment, between the new Ministry of Defence building and the River Thames, just south of Horse Guards Avenue.

== Description of the London statue ==
The larger than life size statue depicts the British Army officer Charles George Gordon standing in his army uniform, carrying a cane and a bible, with his head resting on his raised right hand, and his left foot resting on a broken cannon.

The plinth of Portland stone bears inscriptions and two bronze plaques, one on each side. The main inscription in the stone on the front of the plinth reads: "CHARLES G. GORDON C.B. / MAJOR-GEN. ROYAL ENGINEERS // KILLED AT KHARTOUM / XXVI JANUARY / MDCCCLXXXV". Further inscriptions on the stone plinth list his actions, clockwise from the south front: "CRIMEA 1855 N CHINA 1864 / QUINSAN SOOCHOW / SOUDAN KHARTOUM / GRAVESEND EQUATOR". These inscriptions record his service in the Crimean War; at Kunshan ("Quinsan") and Suzhou ("Soochow") during the Taiping Rebellion while leading the Ever Victorious Army; at Gravesend while commanding the Royal Engineers building defences along the River Thames; and in Equatoria (southern Sudan), in Sudan ("Soudan") and at Khartoum.

The bronze plaques on either side of the plinth depict pairs of allegorical figures in relief, identified by further stone inscriptions, as "FORTITUDE" (with shield and sword) alongside "FAITH" (hooded), and "CHARITY" (with two children) alongside "JUSTICE" (blindfold, with scales and sword). The shield of Fortitude bears the legend "RIGHT / FEARS NO / MIGHT".

== Other statues ==
An identical statue by Thornycroft was installed in 1889 at Gordon Reserve in Melbourne, Australia, on the triangle between Macarthur Street and Spring Street to the south of Parliament House, facing towards the Old Treasury Building. It still stands on its original tall pedestal, which bears scenes from Gordon's life.

A different memorial statue by Edward Onslow Ford, depicting Gordon on a camel, stands at Brompton Barracks, Chatham, the home of the Royal School of Military Engineering. It became Grade II* listed in 1998. A second cast of Ford's statue of Gordon on a camel was installed in Khartoum from 1904 until 1958. Shortly after Sudan achieved its independence, the statue was removed and reinstalled at Gordon's School, near Woking, in 1959, where it has a Grade II listing.

Further memorial statues to Gordon stand in Aberdeen; in Gravesham, where the full length stone statue depicts Gordon in his army uniform with a sabre; and there is a Grade II listed monument in Southampton.

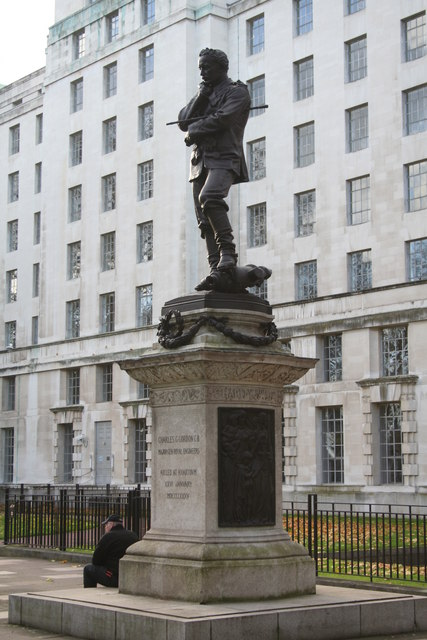
Statue of General Gordon on the Victoria Embankment in London

London statue between the fountains in Trafalgar Square, 1890

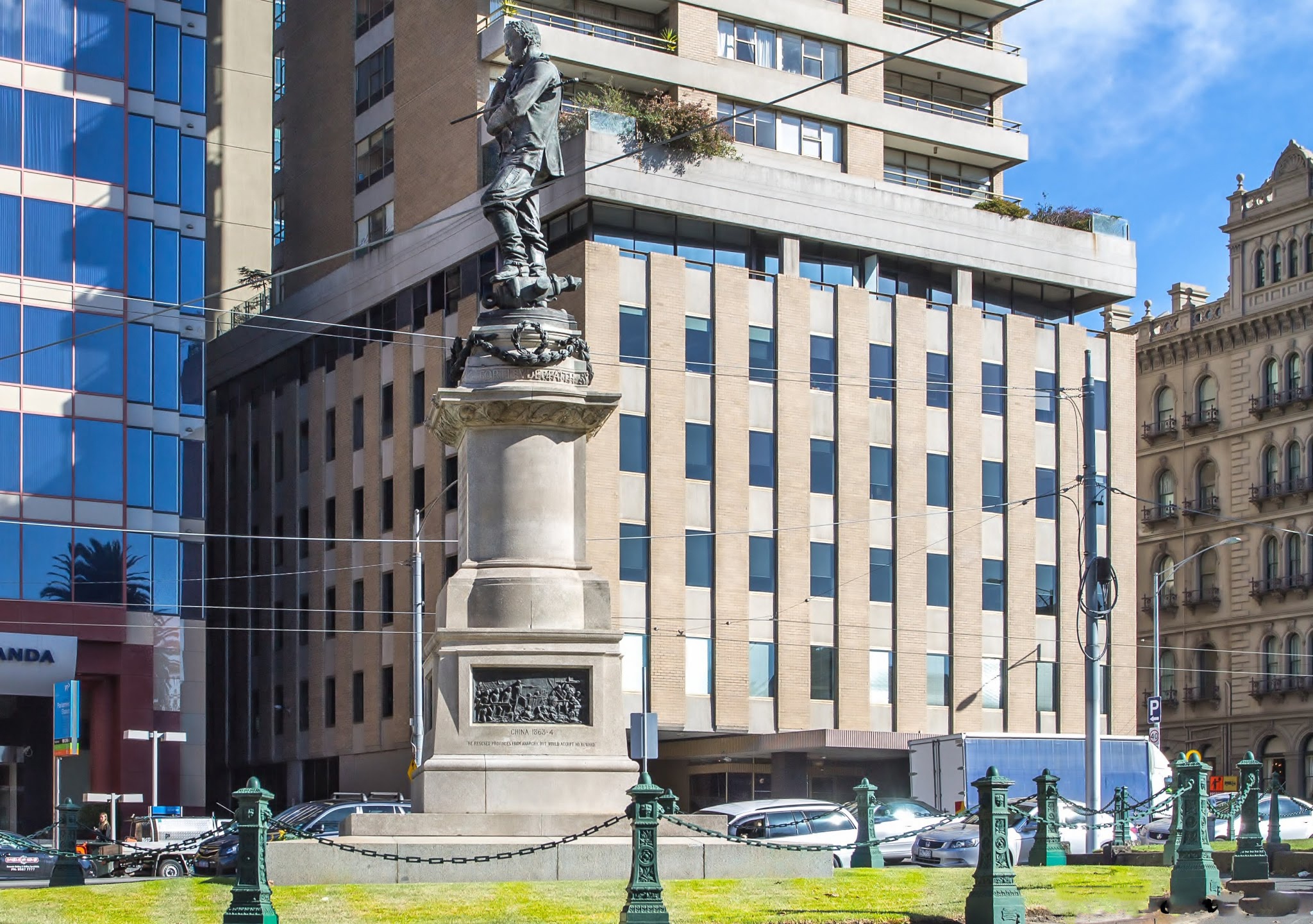
Statue of General Gordon in Melbourne, Australia

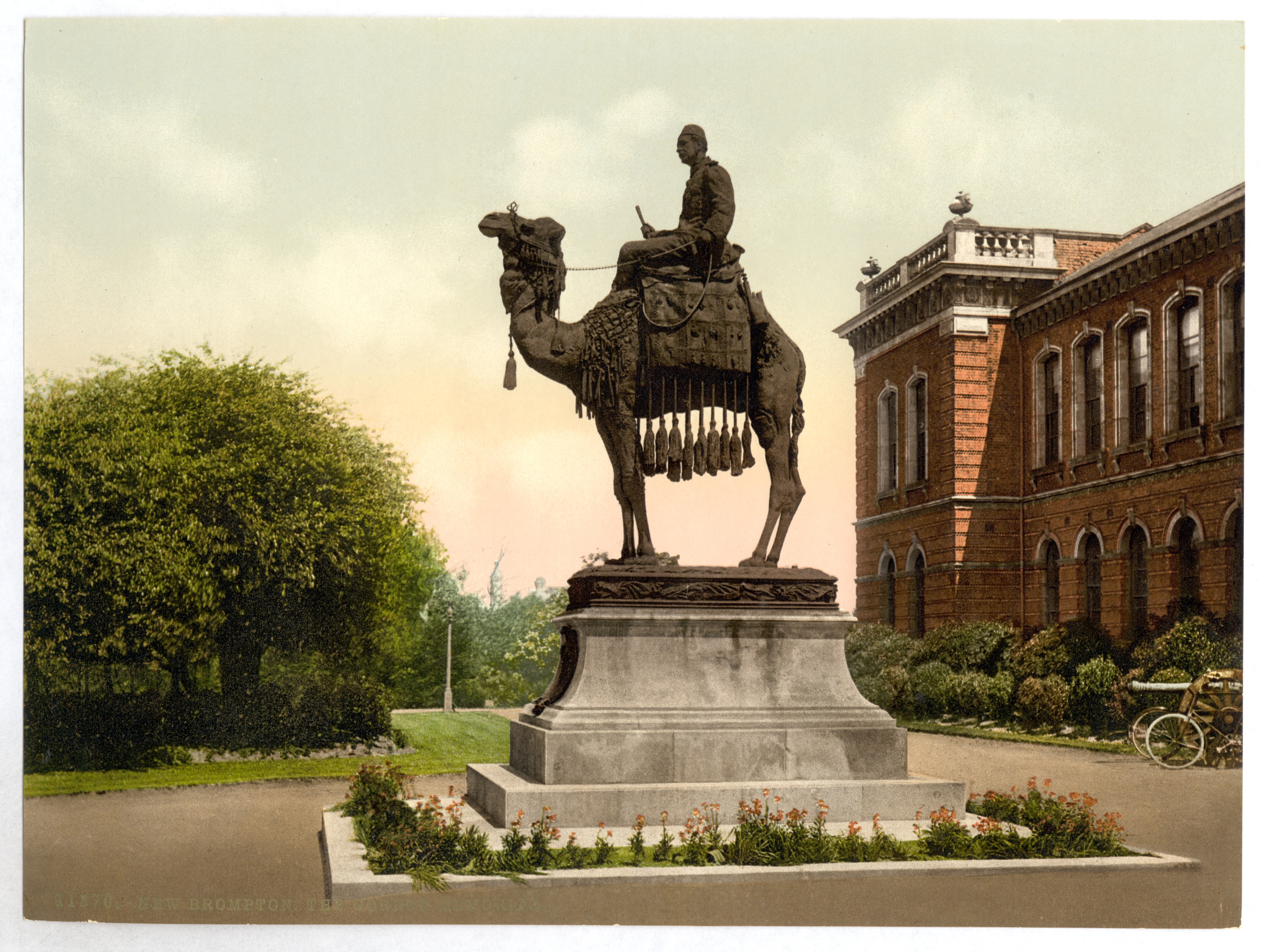
Statue at Brompton Barracks, c.1900

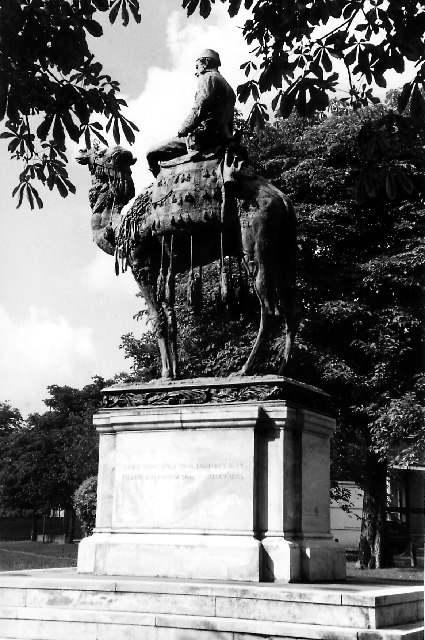
Statue at Gordon's School, near Chobham, Surrey

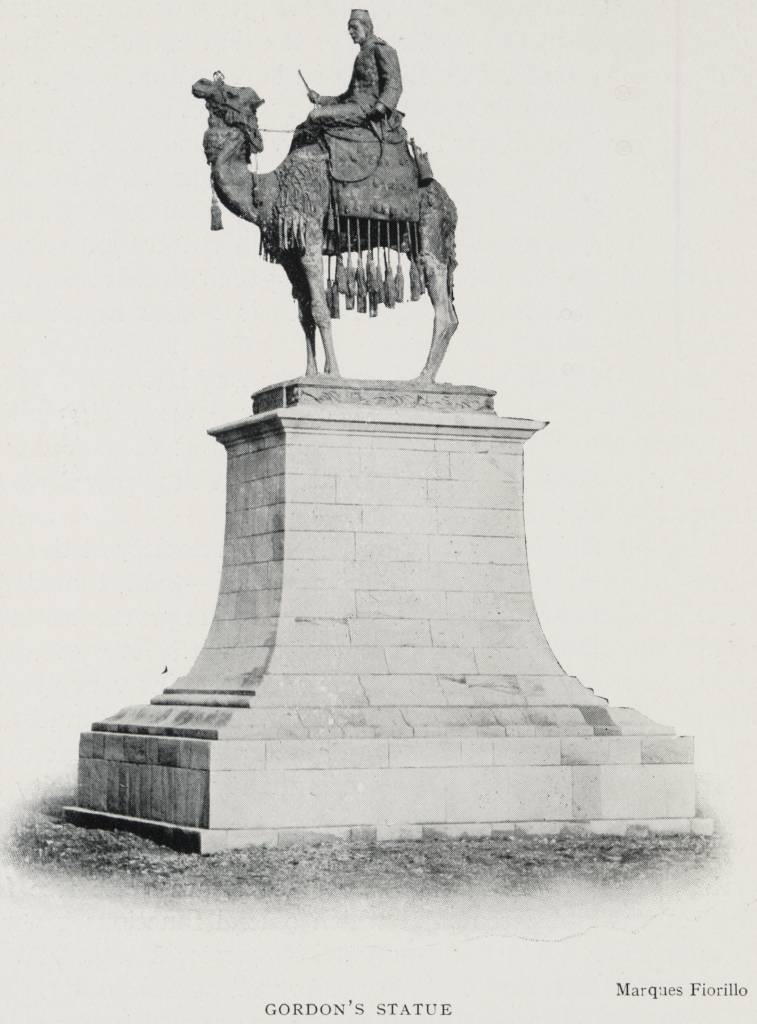
Statue in Khartoum, 1906

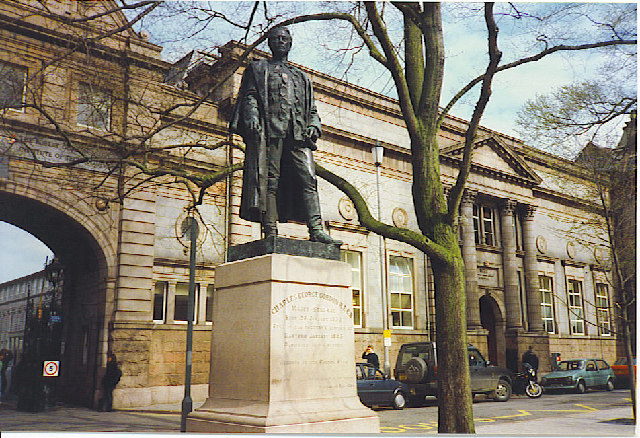
Statue outside Robert Gordon's school, Aberdeen

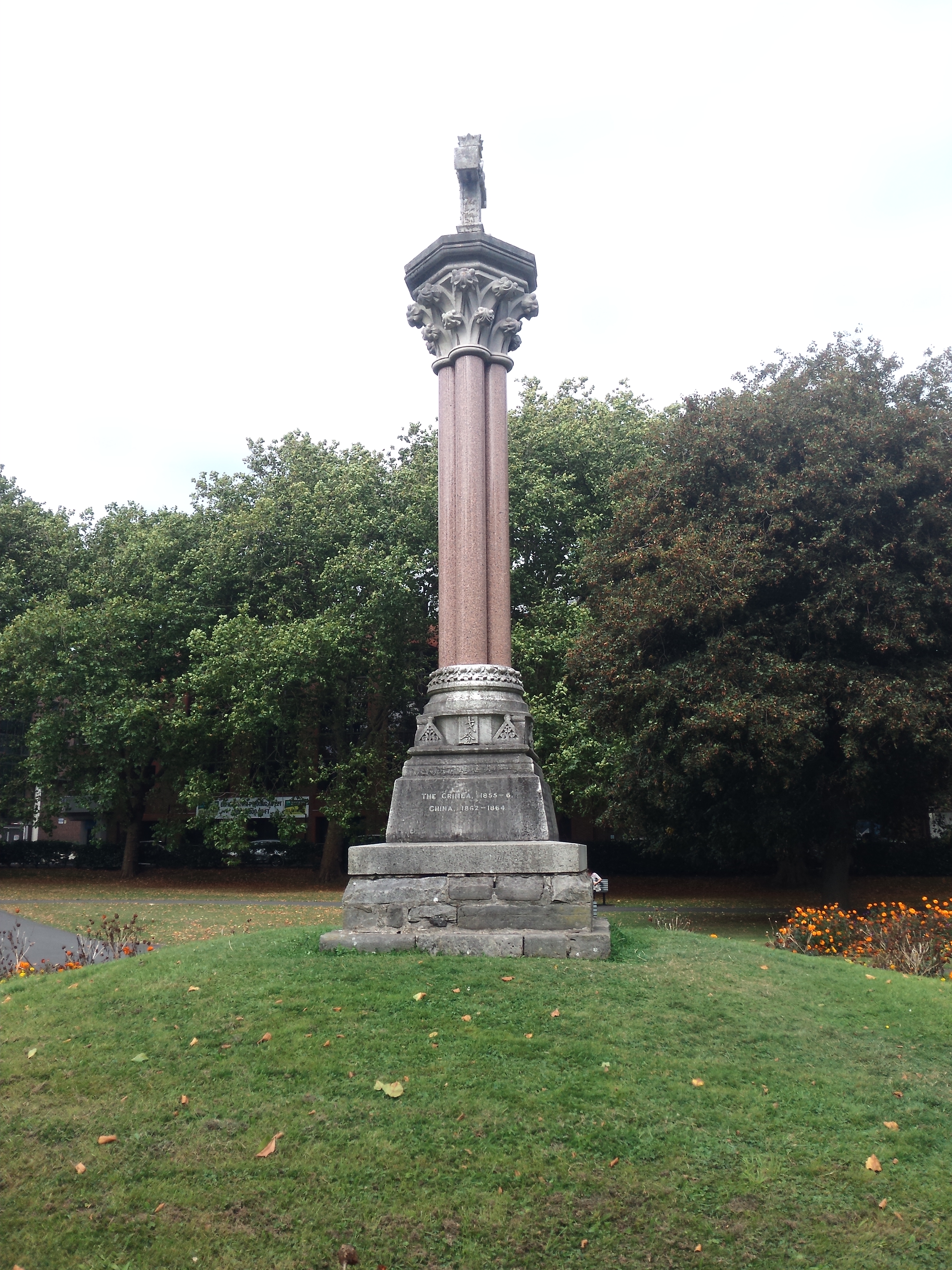
Memorial to Gordon, Southampton
