= St Alban's Church, Holborn =

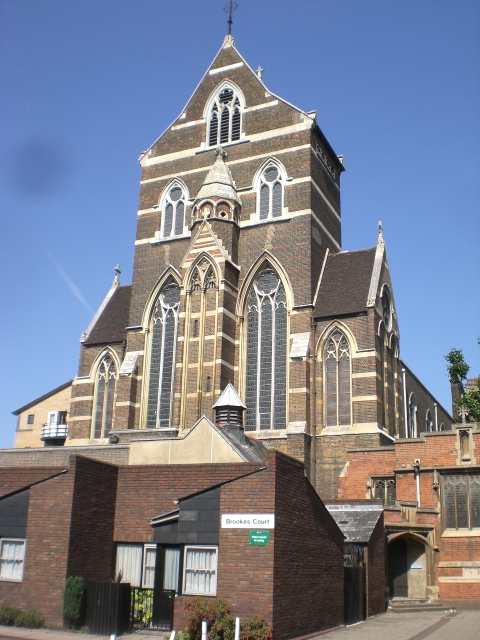
- St Alban's Church, Holborn
- 51°31′10.772″N 0°6′38.174″W
- Location: Holborn, London
- Country: England
- Denomination: Church of England
- Churchmanship: Traditional Catholic
- Website: www.stalbansholborn.co.uk

History
- Status: Active
- Dedication: St Alban

Architecture
- Functional status: Parish church
- Heritage designation: Grade II* listed
- Designated: 1951
- Architect: William Butterfield
- Style: Neo-Gothic
- Years built: 1861–1862

Administration
- Province: Canterbury
- Diocese: London
- Archdeaconry: Hampstead

Clergy
- Bishop(s): Jonathan Baker, PEV
- Vicar: Fr Christopher Smith

St Alban's Church, Holborn, is a Church of England parish church in Holborn, central London, for a time becoming one of two churches of its parish which retains the name and St Peter's Saffron Hill to serve the mixed-use zone, notable for jewel-setting and for law firms. It has been Grade II* listed since 1951. This land is commonly – other than mainly to state Holborn, meaning part of Holborn – called Hatton Garden. St Peter's church is defunct, rationalising the number of churches in line with population changes of the district.

== History ==
=== Beginnings ===
The high poverty shown in blue plus in pink, those generally of adequate means, on the outskirts (of this, the central zone) in about 1889. Click for broader map and to enable varied magnification.

William Henry, 2nd Baron Leigh, gave the site for the church. It was built with funds from John Hubbard, 1st Baron Addington, and designed by William Butterfield in 1859. Construction occurred between 1861 and 1862 in yellow and red stock bricks with stone dressings and tiled roofs. In 1862 Alexander Mackonochie became its first perpetual curate. He introduced a daily Eucharist, which featured Gregorian chant and significant ritual elements (e.g. the lighting of altar candles and the cleansing of eucharistic vessels at the altar). St Alban's was the first Anglican church to hold the three-hour devotion on Good Friday (in 1864) and one of the first to celebrate a Harvest Festival. Mackonochie also openly heard confessions. Mackonochie's pastoral ministry was typical of the 19th-century ritualist "slum priest". With his two curates, Arthur Stanton (who remained at the church until his death in 1913) and Edward Russell, and lay assistants he founded schools, soup kitchens, a working men's club, mothers' meetings, clothing funds and more. Though he remained until 1882 and remained as an assistant priest thereafter, he became known as "the martyr of St Alban's" from those making "regular" Low Church requests and moves to temper his ritualism.

In 1891 a chapel was added to designs by Charles Henry Money Mileham (1837–1917), with the chapel's stained glass by Charles Eamer Kempe added in 1898 – it now also contains two Stations of the Cross by Ninian Comper.

The 1890s saw the future bishop Hensley Henson (then vicar of St Margaret's Barking) frequently visit as a guest preacher.

=== 1900–present ===
In 1938 the church hosted England's first complete performance of Olivier Messiaen's La Nativité du Seigneur, organised by Felix Aprahamian and played by the composer himself. The church was burned out during the London Blitz in 1941, though the chapel survived. The main church was restored by Adrian Gilbert Scott between 1959 and 1961, including a new organ by John Compton. Beside the church's entrance is a 1985 sculpture by Hans Feibusch entitled 'Jesus being Raised from the Dead' – the same artist had produced the church's current set of Stations of the Cross (date unknown) and a mural of the Holy Trinity for the east wall (1966).

On 9 June 1990 the church hosted the foundation of Affirming Catholicism, representing a liberal strand of Anglo-Catholicism, though the church itself is now considered a traditionalist Anglo-Catholic parish – as such, it is under the Alternative Episcopal Oversight of the Bishop of Fulham (now the Rt Revd Jonathan Baker).

The present incumbent, the Revd Christopher Smith SSC, succeeded former Archdeacon of Egypt, the Ven. Howard Levett SSC (1944–2016), following his retirement in 2010. Appointed Vicar of St Alban's in 2011, Fr Smith also serves as Chaplain to the Aldermanic Sheriff of London (for 2024/25), Gregory Jones KC.

== Organists ==
- Thomas Morley 1862 – ????
- Alfred Cellier 1868–????
- Mr Branscome ????-1879
- James Farquharson Walenn 1879–1884
- George Sampson 1884–1888
- Thomas Adams 1888–1918
- A. Sidney Marks 1918–1919
- George Oldroyd 1919–1920
- G. D. Cunningham 1920–1924
- W.J. Phillips 1924
- Owen Le Patourel Franklin 1925–1928
- Bertram J Orsman 1928–1929
- Reginald Goodall 1929–1936
- Arnold Richardson 1936–1942
- Arthur E. Watts 1949–1952
- H.F. Arnold 1952–1954
- Frederick S. Waterman 1954–1957
- Ivan Kilian 1957–1958
- Edward Alfred Bloomfield 1959–1961
- Michael J Foley 1962–1980
- Michael Fleming 1980–1998
- Edward Batting 1998–current

== Gallery of architectural features ==
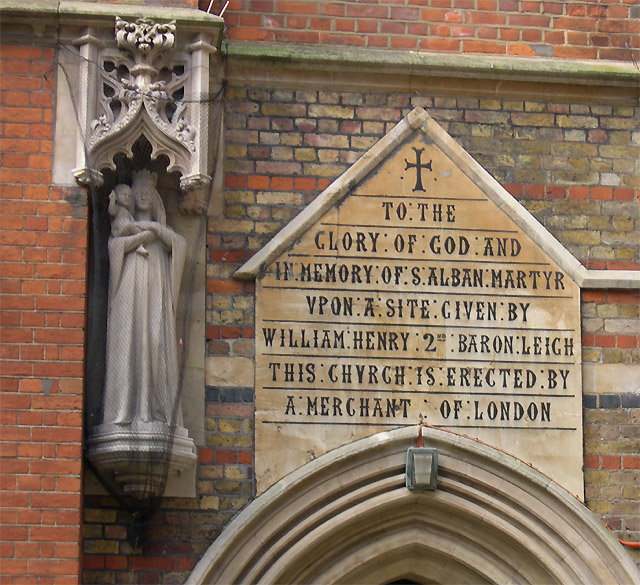
West door inscription

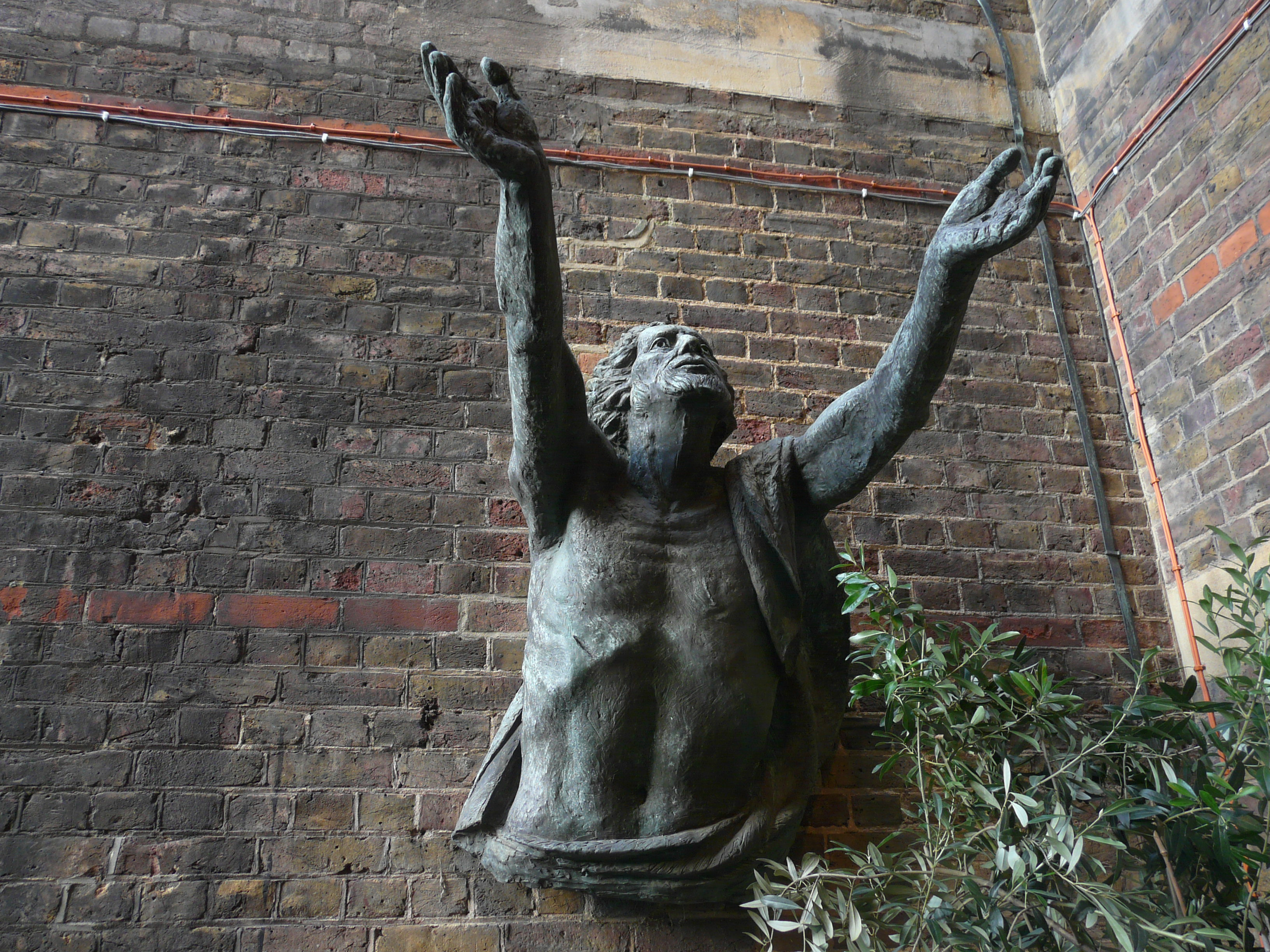
'Jesus Being Raised From the Dead' by Hans Feibusch
