= Hamo Thornycroft =

English sculptor (1850–1925)

Sir Hamo Thornycroft RA
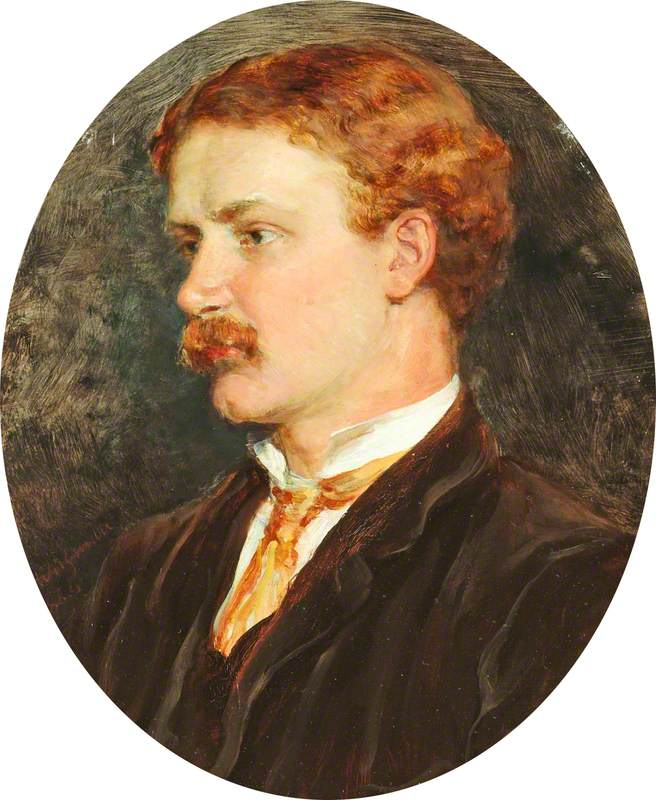
- William Hamo Thornycroft, 1884 by Theodore Blake Wirgman
- Born: 9 March 1850; London, England
- Died: 18 December 1925 (aged 75); Oxford, England
- Occupation: Artist
- Known for: Sculpture

Sir William Hamo Thornycroft RA (9 March 1850 – 18 December 1925) was an English sculptor, responsible for some of London's best-known statues, including the statue of Oliver Cromwell outside the Palace of Westminster. He was a keen student of classical sculpture and was one of the youngest artists to be elected to the Royal Academy, in 1882, the same year the bronze cast of Teucer was purchased for the British nation under the auspices of the Chantrey Bequest.

He was a leading figure in the establishment of the New Sculpture movement, which provided a transition between the neoclassical styles of the 19th century and later modernist developments.

== Biography ==
=== Early life and education ===
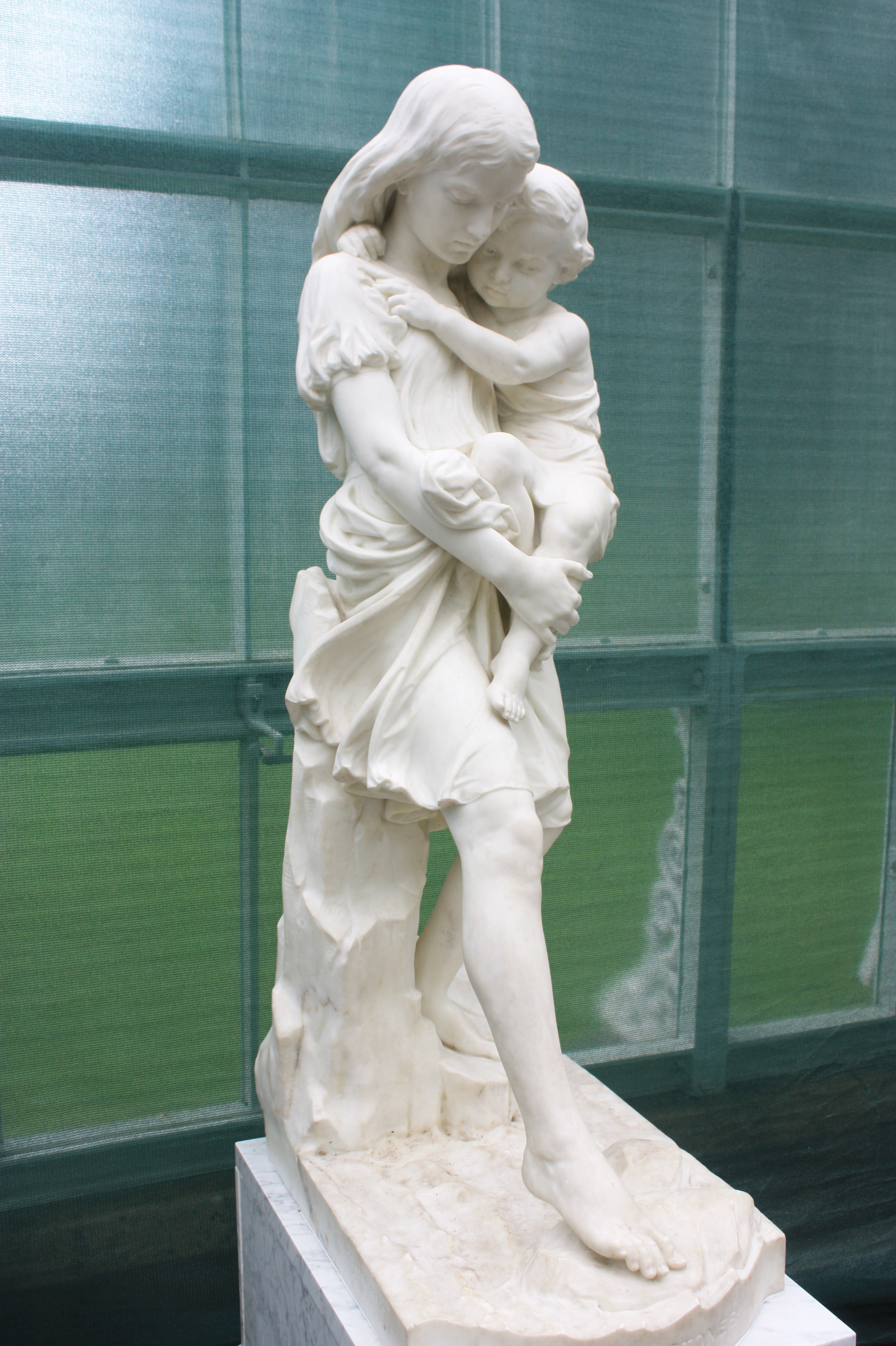
Stepping Stones, Kibble Palace, Glasgow

William Hamo Thornycroft was born in London into the Thornycroft family of sculptors. Both his parents, Thomas and Mary, and his maternal grandfather, John Francis, were distinguished sculptors. As a young child, Hamo was sent to live with an uncle on a farm in Cheshire until, aged nine, he began studying at the Modern Free Grammar School in Macclesfield, before in 1863 returning to London as a pupil at the University College School. He subsequently, from 1869, studied at the Royal Academy, where his primary influence was the painter-sculptor Frederic Leighton. While a student, Thornycroft assisted his father, Thomas, on the monumental sculptural group Boadicea and Her Daughters, later installed beside Westminster Bridge in London. At the Royal Academy Schools, Hamo Thornycroft won two medals and obtained his first paid commission for a work, a bust of a Dr. Sharpey.

In 1871, Thornycroft visited Italy and Paris and assisted his parents in creating the Poets' Fountain for Park Lane in London, by making several figures of poets in marble and bronze. The fountain was ultimately destroyed in the Second World War. During the first half of the 1870s he exhibited works on a regular basis at the Royal Academy, showing Fame, the Sharpey bust, a bust of Mrs Mordaunt and a model for an equestrian statue of Lord Mayo. In 1876 Thornycroft won the Gold Medal of the Royal Academy with the statue Warrior Bearing a Wounded Youth.

=== Early career ===
Thornycroft created a series of statues in the ideal genre in the late 1870s and early 1880s that sought to reanimate the format of the classical statue. These included Lot's Wife (1878) and Artemis and her Hound (1880 plaster, 1882 marble). In 1880 he was elected an Associate of the Royal Academy, and produced the Homeric bowman Teucer (1881 plaster, 1882 bronze), and the Mower (1884 plaster, 1894 bronze), arguably the first life-size freestanding statue of a contemporary labourer in 19th-century sculpture. Both Artemis and her Hound and Teucer combined classical compositions with an increased sense of naturalism to imply movement and energy. A companion piece to the Mower, the Sower, was exhibited in 1886 at the Royal Academy. When, in 1894, the critic Edmund Gosse coined the term "The New Sculpture", he formulated its early principles from Thornycroft's work.

After 1884, Thornycroft's reputation was secure and he won commissions for a number of major monuments, most notably the innovative General Gordon in Trafalgar Square and since moved to Victoria Embankment Gardens. Other significant works he created included an effigy of Harvey Goodwin, Bishop of Carlisle (1895; Carlisle Cathedral), and the statues of Oliver Cromwell (Westminster), Dean Colet (a bronze group, early Italianate in feeling, outside St Paul's School, formerly in Hammersmith and now in Barnes, London), Alfred the Great (Winchester), the Gladstone Memorial (in the Strand, London) and Mandell Creighton, Bishop of London (bronze, erected in St Paul's Cathedral). Other significant memorials were built in several cities then in the British Empire.

=== Architectural work ===
The Institute of Chartered Accountants in England and Wales (ICAEW) Council commissioned Thornycroft to produce a detailed sculpted frieze for their headquarters at Chartered Accountants' Hall for a cost of £3,000. Thornycroft's frieze, carved between 1889 and 1893, includes a series of figures representing Arts, Sciences, Crafts, Education, Commerce, Manufacture, Agriculture, Mining, Railways, Shipping, India, the Colonies, and Building. The figure of the architect is based on the Hall's architect, John Belcher, and the sculptor on Thornycroft himself. The figure of the solicitor is H. Markby of Markby, Stewart & Co., who acted for ICAEW in its early years.

=== Later works ===
Thornycroft continued to be a central member of the sculptural establishment and the Royal Academy into the 20th century. He was awarded the medal of honour at the 1900 Paris Exhibition, and was knighted in 1917. In 1901, he began a series of small bronze statuettes for the home market while continuing to work on large commissions. His single largest work, the monument to Lord Curzon, was unveiled in Calcutta in 1913.

Thornycroft exhibited The Kiss, a large ideal piece he had worked on for three years, at the Royal Academy in 1916, and received a standing ovation from his fellow artists when it was unveiled. He was awarded the first gold medal bestowed by the Royal Society of British Sculptors in 1924, although he had previously, in 1908, declined the offer of the presidency of that body. Thornycroft's last major work was the tomb effigy of Bishop Huyshe Yeatman-Biggs which was shown at the Royal Academy in 1925 and subsequently installed in Coventry Cathedral.

Thornycroft became increasingly resistant to new developments in sculpture, although his work of the early 1880s helped to catalyse sculpture in the United Kingdom towards those new directions. In sum, he provided an important transition between the neoclassical and academic styles of the 19th century and its fin-de-siècle and modernist departures.

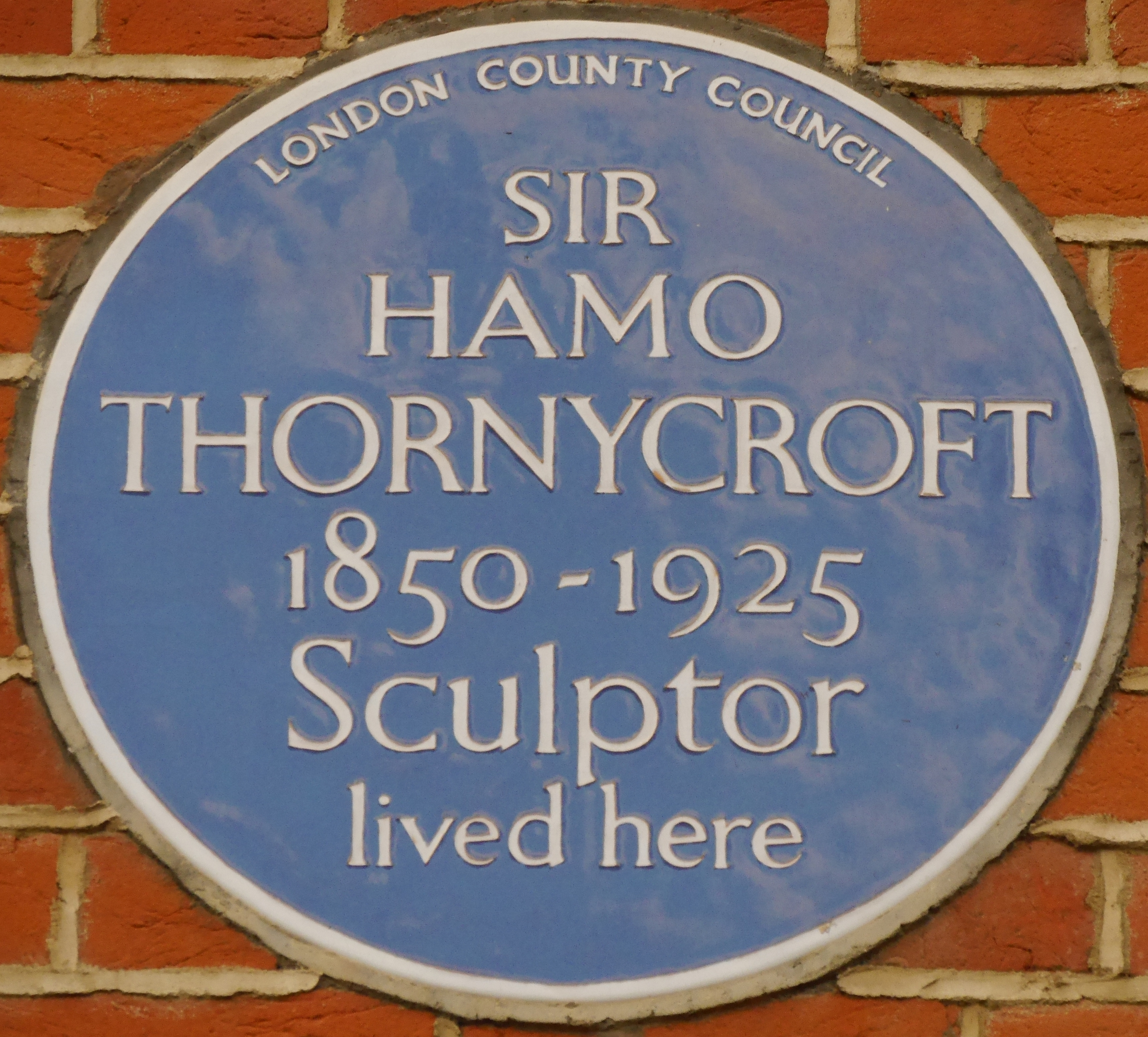
Blue plaque, 2a Melbury Road, London

A blue plaque commemorates Thornycroft at 2b Melbury Road, Kensington, London W14, his studio designed by his lifelong friend the architect John Belcher, c. 1892.

== Family ==
In addition to his parents, Thornycroft's grandfather John Francis was also a distinguished sculptor. His brother, Sir John Isaac Thornycroft, became a successful naval engineer; their sister, Theresa, was the mother of the poet Siegfried Sassoon; Theresa and sisters Alyce and Helen Thornycroft were artists.

In 1884, Hamo married Agatha Cox (1865–1958), who was fourteen years his junior. At a dinner in 1889, Agatha was introduced to Thomas Hardy, who later described her as "the most beautiful woman in England" and admitted that she was one of the models for the title character in his novel Tess of the D'Urbervilles. Agatha and her husband were interested in the concept of "artistic dress", and a dress worn by her (presumed to be her wedding dress) is held in the costume collection of the Victoria & Albert Museum, donated by their daughter, Elfrida Mary Manning, née Thornycroft (1901–1987), who was also his biographer.

== Selected public works ==
=== 1878 to 1889 ===
Image	Title / subject	Location and coordinates	Date	Type	Material	Dimensions	Designation	Wikidata	Notes
More images	Lot's Wife	Victoria & Albert Museum, London	1878	Statue	Marble				Previously located in Leighton House.
	Stepping Stones	Kibble Palace, Glasgow Botanic Gardens	1878	Sculpture	Marble				
	Teucer	Tate	1881	Statue	Bronze	44 cm high			Several versions exist
	Charles Turner (MP) & Charles William Turner	Turner Home, Liverpool	1885	Sculpture group on pedestal	Marble		Grade II		
	Samuel Taylor Coleridge	Westminster Abbey, London	1885	Bust	Marble				
More images	A Sower	Kew Gardens, London	1886	Statue on pedestal	Bronze and Portland stone		Grade II	Q27082922	
More images	General Gordon	Victoria Embankment Gardens, London	1887–88	Statue on pedestal with plaques	Bronze and Portland stone	3.1m (statue only)	Grade II	Q26319159	Relocated from Trafalgar Square

=== 1890 to 1899 ===
Image	Title / subject	Location and coordinates	Date	Type	Material	Dimensions	Designation	Wikidata	Notes
	John Bright	Broadfield Park, Rochdale	1891	Statue on pedestal	Bronze and stone		Grade II	Q26651280	
	Queen Victoria	Royal Exchange, London	1891-6	Statue	Marble				Relocated to Victoria Barracks, Windsor in 1996.
More images	Peter Denny	Dumbarton, Scotland	Statue 1898, erected 1902	Statue on pedestal	Bronze and granite		Category B	Q17848328	
More images	Queen Victoria	Francis Farewell Square, Durban, South Africa	1898	Statue on pedestal	Marble and stone			Q115106431	
More images	Statue of Oliver Cromwell	Outside of the Palace of Westminster, London	1899	Statue on pedestal with supporting figure	Bronze and Portland stone		Grade II	Q3497572	

=== 1900 to 1909 ===
Image	Title / subject	Location and coordinates	Date	Type	Material	Dimensions	Designation	Wikidata	Notes
More images	Alfred the Great	High Street, Winchester	1901	Statue on pedestal and base	Bronze and granite		Grade II	Q26461216	
More images	William Plunket	Kildare Street, Dublin	1901	Statue on pedestal	Bronze and stone				
More images	Dean John Colet and Two Pupils	St Paul's School, London	1902	Sculpture group on pedestal with canopy	Bronze and stone				Originally installed at the school's previous site in Hammersmith, relocated in 1968.
More images	William Ewart Gladstone	George Square, Glasgow	1902	Statue on pedestal with plaque	Bronze and granite		Category B	Q17792886	
More images	Memorial to William Ewart Gladstone	The Strand, London	1905	Statue on pedestal with supporting figures	Bronze and Portland stone	11m tall	Grade II	Q27081590	
More images	Mandell Creighton	St Paul's Cathedral, London	1905	Statue on pedestal	Bronze & green marble				
More images	William Armstrong, 1st Baron Armstrong	Barras Bridge, Newcastle-upon-Tyne	1905–6	Statue with screen wall, steps and relief panels	Bronze and stone		Grade II	Q26586754	
	Statue of Queen Victoria	Mohatta Palace Museum, Karachi, Pakistan	1906	Statue on pedestal with supporting figures	Marble & bronze			Q76544412	Originally erected at Frere Hall on a tall pedestal with bronze figures representing India, Justice & Peace and two lioness, all of which were badly damaged in 1947
More images	Cecil Rhodes	Kimberley, South Africa	1907	Equestrian statue on pedestal and steps	Bronze and stone			Q20972960	
More images	Boer War Memorial	St Ann's Square, Manchester	1908	Sculpture group on pedestal with plaques	Bronze, granite and marble		Grade II	Q26546131	
	Alfred Lord Tennyson	Trinity College Chapel, Cambridge	1909	Seated statue on pedestal	Stone				

=== 1910 to 1925 ===
Image	Title / subject	Location and coordinates	Date	Type	Material	Dimensions	Designation	Wikidata	Notes
More images	Sir Daniel Dixon, 1st Baronet	Belfast City Hall	1910	Statue on pedestal with plaques	Bronze and stone		Grade A	Q17778494	
More images	The Kiss	Tate Britain, London	1916	Sculpture group on base	Marble	1.7m high			
More images	C. E. H. Tempest-Hicks	St Mary the Virgin, Monken Hadley	c. 1922	Memorial tablet	Marble			Q106783020	
More images	Statue of Haron Baronian	Library garden, Knutsford	Unveiled 1922	Statue on pedestal	Bronze and stone				Statue relocated twice, since 2018 part of the Great War Centenary memorial in Knutsford.
More images	War memorial	George Street, Luton	1922	Statue on cenotaph	Bronze and Portland stone	Approx. 19m tall	Grade II	Q26408428	Architect, Sir Reginald Blomfield
More images	Bishop Huyshe Yeatman-Biggs	Coventry Cathedral	1925	Chest tomb and effigy	Bronze and stone				

=== Other works ===
- Lord Mayo, 1876, Kolkata, India, bronze equestrian statue, relocated to Barrackpore
- Thomas Clarkson, 1877, St Mary's Church, Playford, Suffolk, memorial relief in marble
- Thomas Gray, 1885, Chapel of Pembroke College, Cambridge, marble bust and bronze relief
- Sir John Goss, 1886, St Paul's Cathedral, marble panel within a larger monument by John Belcher
- Henry Bradshaw, 1887, Fitzwilliam Museum, Cambridge, marble bust
- General Gordon, 1889, Melbourne, Australia, bronze statue on pedestal
- George Leveson-Gower, exhibited 1895, unveiled 1896, Central Lobby, Houses of Parliament, marble statue

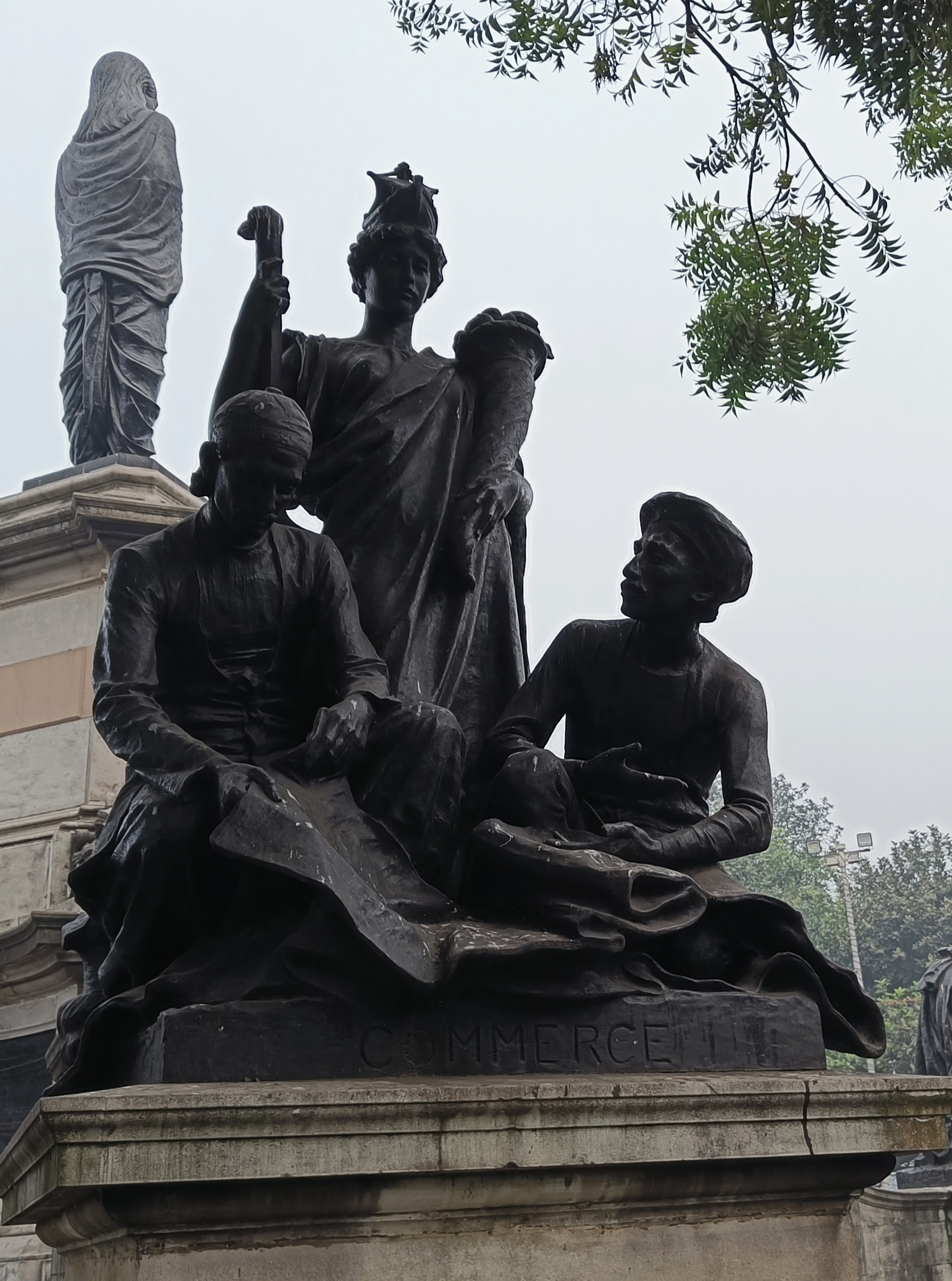
Commerce, former Curzon monument, Kolkata

- Marble statue of Sir Steuart Bayley, completed 1894, erected 1896 Kolkata, located in Dalhousie Square, Kolkata until the 1950s, current location unknown
- Bishop Harvey Goodwin, 1895, Carlisle Cathedral, bronze effigy with figures
- James Timmins Chance, 1897, West Smethwick Park, Smethwick, bronze bust
- Boer War Memorial, 1905, Durban, bronze figure of Peace Descending on pedestal with two figures of lions and four reliefs of military scenes
- Marble seated statue of Queen Victoria, erected Ajodhya, India, 1908, moved to the State Museum Lucknow during 1981-82 A copy of this statue, also in marble, was erected at Qaisar Bagh in Lucknow and is now in the same museum
- Bronze bust of Bishop Mandell Creighton, 1909, Lambeth Palace, London
- George V as the Prince of Wales, 1911, Kolkata, marble statue
- Lord Curzon, 1912, approach to the grounds of the Victoria Memorial, Kolkata, bronze statue on Portland stone pedestal with four supporting groups and four reliefs, partly dismantled in the 1950s, with the figure of Curzon relocated to Barrackpore and replaced with a statue of Sri Aurobindo. The four groups representing Famine Relief, Agriculture, Commerce and Peace remain in their original location as do the four relief panels.
- Bust of Thomas Hardy, 1915, National Portrait Gallery, London
- Edward VII, 1917, Frere Park, Karachi, marble statue on pedestal with bronze groups, representing Britannia and Peace, and statues of a British soldier and of Khudadad Khan, VC, at base. Now damaged and dismantled as an assembly with the remains in the Mohatta Palace in Karachi.
- The Victoria and Albert Museum holds a plaster model, dated 1884, of an equestrian statue of Edward I that Thornycroft completed in 1884 for a competition to select statues for the approaches to Blackfriars Bridge in London, a project that was subsequently abandoned.

== Gallery ==
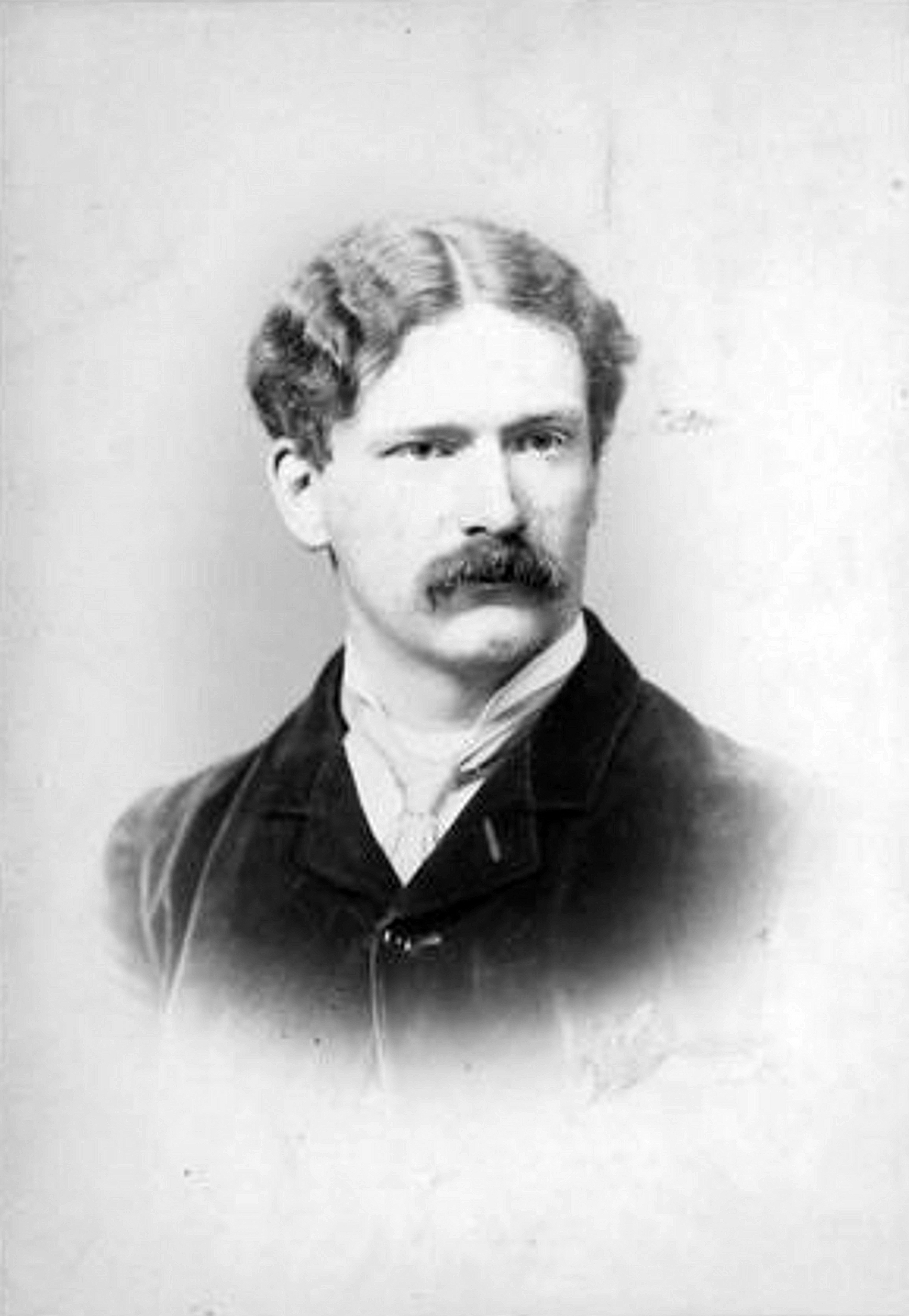
Hamo Thornycroft, by Maull and Fox, c. 1880

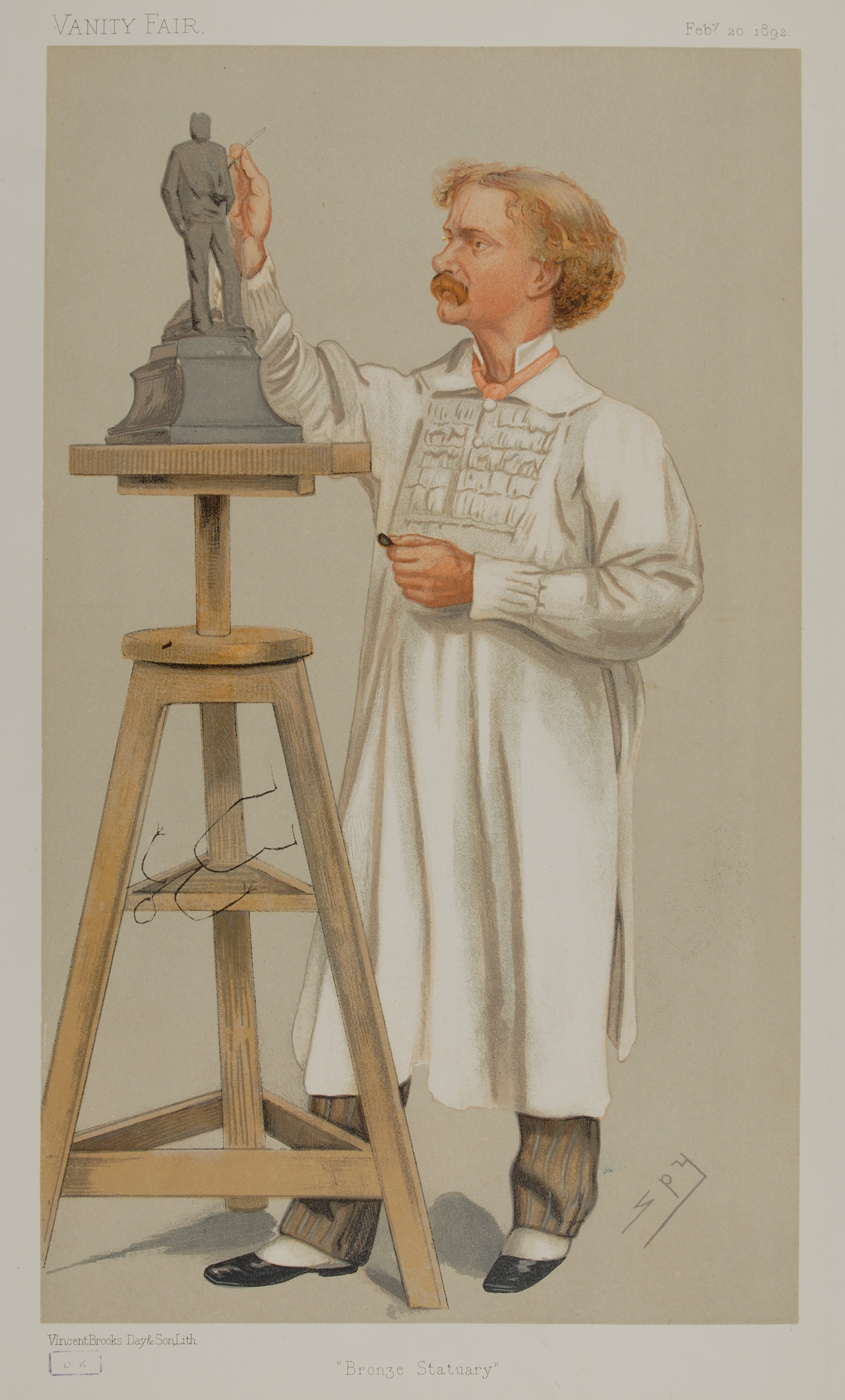
Caricature by Spy for Vanity Fair magazine, 1892

== Writings ==
- "Lecture to the Sculpture Students of the Royal Academy of Art, 1885" reprinted in the Journal of the Walpole Society, vol. 69 (2007): 211–26.
