= List of public art in the City of London =

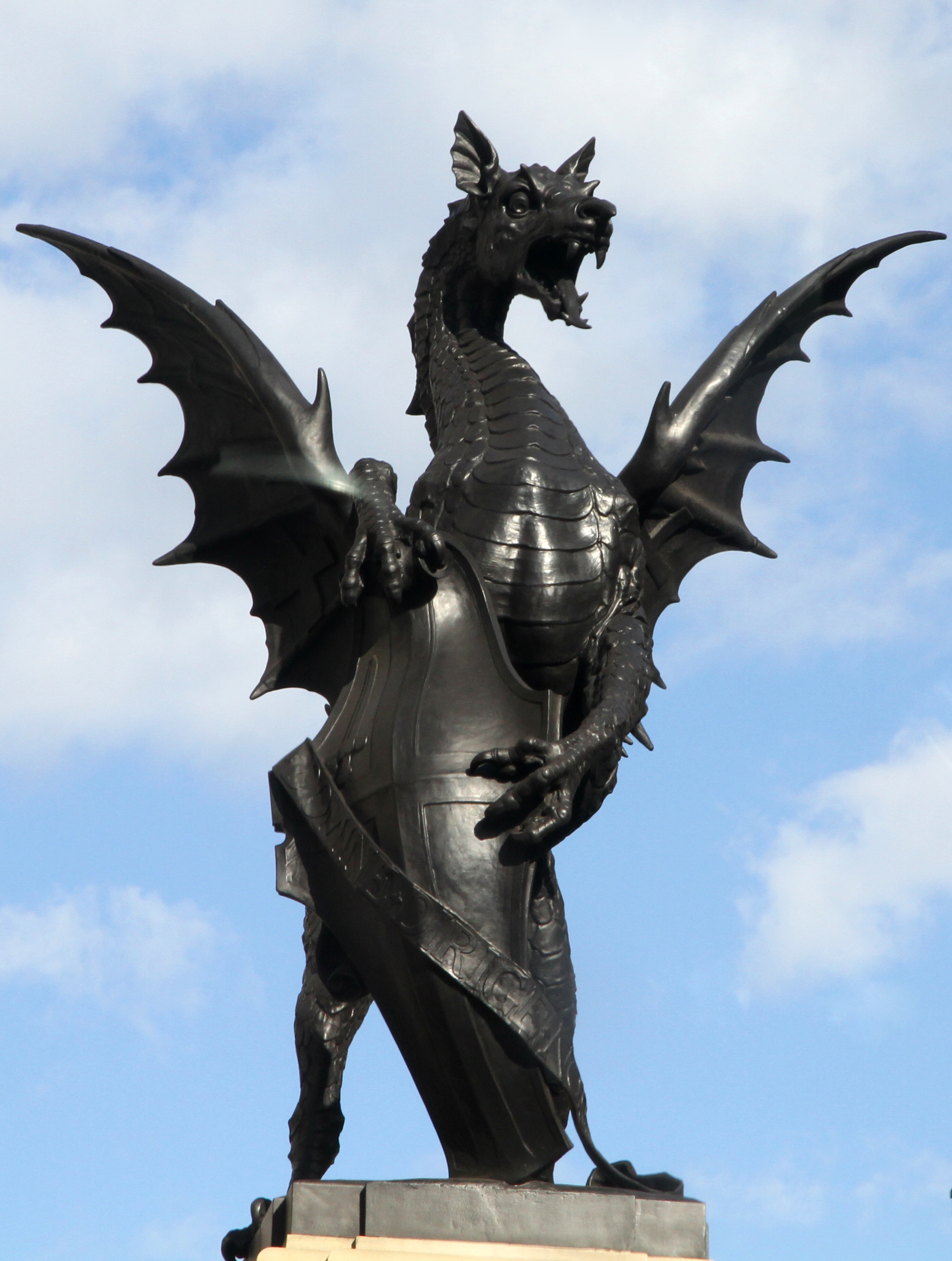
The Temple Bar Marker

This is a list of public art in the City of London, including statues, busts, commemorative plaques and other memorials.

The City of London is the historic nucleus of London as well as its modern financial centre. The City of London Corporation, its municipal governing body, states that "around almost every corner in the City you will find an unusual piece of public art or a commemoration of the City's great history". This article lists the various permanent works of public art by the ward in which they are located.

In the 19th century, sculpture was incorporated into major engineering schemes such as the Victoria Embankment and the Holborn Viaduct. Entrances to the City are marked by statues of dragons (often mistakenly called griffins) bearing the City's shield. The most elaborate of these is the Temple Bar Marker of 1880, which replaced a gate to the City, while two on the Victoria Embankment were originally made for the Coal Exchange building in 1849, and were repurposed as boundary markers in 1963.

Since 2010, the City has hosted an annual exhibition of public sculpture, called Sculpture in the City.

== Aldersgate ==
Image	Title / subject	Location and coordinates	Date	Artist / designer	Architect / other	Type	Designation	Notes
	Drinking fountain	Aldersgate Street 51.5169°N 0.0970°W	1870	?	—N/a	Drinking fountain	Grade II	
More images	Memorial to Heroic Self-Sacrifice	Postman's Park 51.5169°N 0.0979°W	1900	George Frederic Watts and T. H. Wren (central statuette of Watts, pictured)	—N/a	Memorial	Grade II	
More images	The Gold Smelters	Aldersgate Street 51.5214°N 0.0972°W	1901	John Daymond and Son	—N/a	Relief sculpture	—N/a	
More images	John Wesley Conversion Place Memorial	Nettleton Court, London Wall 51.5177°N 0.0963°W	1981	Martin Ludlow	—N/a	Sculpture	—N/a	
More images	Dolphin Fountain	Ben Jonson Place, Barbican Estate 51.5205°N 0.0946°W	1989–1990	John Ravera	—N/a	Fountain with sculpture	—N/a	
More images	Union (Horse with Two Discs)	London Wall, outside the Museum of London 51.5176°N 0.0966°W	1999–2000	Christopher Le Brun	—N/a	Sculpture	—N/a	Installed on this site in 2005.

== Aldgate ==
Image	Title / subject	Location and coordinates	Date	Artist / designer	Architect / other	Type	Designation	Notes
	Churchyard gateway and Fitch Memorial Fountain	St Katharine Cree Churchyard	1631 and 1965	?	D. W. Insall and Associates (1965)	Fountain in repurposed architectural setting		
More images	Aldgate Pump	Junction of Leadenhall Street and Fenchurch Street 51.5132°N 0.0779°W	Apparently 18th century	?	—N/a	Water pump	Grade II	
	Steamship's Prow	Holland House, 32 Bury Street	1914–1916	Joseph Mendes da Costa	Hendrik Petrus Berlage	Architectural sculpture	Grade II*	
	The Four Elements	The Scalpel, 52 Lime Street	c. 1954–1957	James Woodford	Kohn Pederson Fox (current setting); Terence Heysham (original setting)	Reliefs	—N/a	
More images	Roundhouse	Outside The Scalpel, 52 Lime Street 51.5132°N 0.08154°W	2018	Joel Perlman	—N/a	Sculpture	—N/a	
	Ventus	Billiter Street, outside 40 Leadenhall Street 51.5132°N 0.0803°W	2024	Lee Simmons		Sculpture	—N/a	

== Bassishaw ==
Image	Title / subject	Location and coordinates	Date	Artist / designer	Architect / other	Type	Designation	Notes
	Foundation stone with allegory of the City	Old Guildhall Library, Basinghall Street	1870	Possibly J. W. Seale	Horace Jones	Relief	Grade II*	
	Elizabeth I, Queen Anne and Queen Victoria	Old Guildhall Library, Basinghall Street	c. 1873	J. W. Seale	Horace Jones	Statues in niches	Grade II*	
	Robert Hargreaves Rogers Drinking Fountain	Junction of Aldermanbury and Love Lane	1891	?	—N/a	Drinking fountain	—N/a	Erected to commemorate Rogers's election as Deputy Alderman.
More images	Memorial to John Heminges and Henry Condell	Former churchyard of St Mary Aldermanbury 51.5164°N 0.0931°W	1895–1896	C. J. Allen	Charles Clement Walker	Memorial with bust	Grade II	Inaugurated 15 July 1896. Incorporates a bronze bust of William Shakespeare. Heminges and Condell, the compilers of Shakespeare's First Folio, were both buried in the parish.
	Maiden keystone	Brewers' Hall, Aldermanbury Square	1958–1960	Charles Wheeler	Hubert Worthington	Architectural sculpture	—N/a	
More images	Ritual	Outside Woolgate Exchange, Coleman Street 51.5164°N 0.0900°W	1968–1969	Antanas Braždys	—N/a	Sculpture	Grade II	
	Glass Fountain	Guildhall Piazza	1969	Allen David	—N/a	Fountain with sculpture	—N/a	
More images	Beyond Tomorrow	Guildhall Piazza 51.5161°N 0.0919°W	1972	Karin Jonzen	—N/a	Sculptural group	—N/a	
More images	The Minotaur	London Wall Place	1973	Michael Ayrton	—N/a	Sculpture	—N/a	The sculpture was previously located at the Yorkshire Sculpture Park and also elsewhere within the Barbican estate.
More images	Unity	Alban Gate 51.5175°N 0.0933°W	1992	Ivan Klapež	—N/a	Sculptural group	—N/a	
More images	Dick Whittington and His Cat	Guildhall Art Gallery	1999	Lawrence Tindall	Richard Gilbert Scott	Architectural sculpture	—N/a	
More images	Bust of Samuel Pepys	Guildhall Art Gallery	1999	Tim Crawley	Richard Gilbert Scott	Architectural sculpture	—N/a	
More images	Bust of Oliver Cromwell	Guildhall Art Gallery	1999	Tim Crawley	Richard Gilbert Scott	Architectural sculpture	—N/a	
More images	Bust of William Shakespeare	Guildhall Art Gallery	1999	Tim Crawley	Richard Gilbert Scott	Architectural sculpture	—N/a	
More images	Bust of Christopher Wren	Guildhall Art Gallery	1999	Tim Crawley	Richard Gilbert Scott	Architectural sculpture	—N/a	
	Standing stone and bench	Aldermanbury Square	2000	Richard Kindersley	—N/a	Standing stone	—N/a	

== Billingsgate ==
Image	Title / subject	Location and coordinates	Date	Artist / designer	Architect / other	Type	Designation	Notes
	Company arms, Triton reliefs, capitals and River God keystone	Watermen's Hall, St Mary at Hill	1779	?	William Blackburn (?)	Architectural sculpture	Grade II*	
	Britannia, Dolphins and City Arms	Old Billingsgate Market	1873–1878	Unknown	Horace Jones	Pediment sculptures	Grade II	
	Camel Caravan	Peek House, 20 Eastcheap, at the junction with Lovat Lane	1884	William Theed	Alexander Peebles	Relief	—N/a	The trademark of Peek Bros.
More images	The Minster Court Horses	Minster Court, Mincing Lane	1989–1990	Althea Wynne	—N/a	Statues	—N/a	
	Lupine Flower	30 Fenchurch Street	2023	Arne Quinze	—N/a	Sculpture	—N/a	

== Bishopsgate ==
Image	Title / subject	Location and coordinates	Date	Artist / designer	Architect / other	Type	Designation	Notes
	Charity Boy and Charity Girl	St Botolph's Church Hall	1821	?	?	Statues in niches	—N/a	
	Ram	New Street	1860s	?	?	Sculpture	—N/a	
	Two drinking fountains	Churchyard of St Botolph-without-Bishopsgate 51.5165°N 0.0815°W	1866	—N/a	?	Drinking fountains	Grade II	
	Bishopsgate Parish War Memorial	Churchyard of St Botolph-without-Bishopsgate 51.516577°N 0.08164°W	1916	Maile and Sons	?	Memorial cross	Grade II	
	Bakers	Former Nordheim Model Bakery, 12–13 Widegate Street	1926	Philip Lindsey Clark	George Val Myer	Reliefs	—N/a	
	Beaver weather vane	Roof of 60–64 Bishopsgate	1926	?	Charles Mewès and Arthur Joseph Davis	Weather vane		
More images	The Cnihtengild	Devonshire Square	1990	Denys Mitchell	—N/a	Equestrian statue	—N/a	
	Cockerel	Cock Hill 51.5176°N 0.0784°W	1991	?	—N/a	Ceramic tiles	—N/a	Artist possibly "W.N."
	Rebellion	East India House, 109 Middlesex Street	1992–1993	Judy Boyt		Sculpture	—N/a	
	Alphabet mural	119 Middlesex Street	2010	Ben Eine	—N/a	Street art	—N/a	Completed September 2010.
	Bishop's mitre	Outside 101–105 Bishopsgate, near its junction with Wormwood Street		?	?	Plaque	—N/a	

=== Broadgate ===
Image	Title / subject	Location and coordinates	Date	Artist / designer	Architect / other	Type	Designation	Notes
More images	Bellerophon Taming Pegasus	Finsbury Avenue 51.5189°N 0.0851°W	1964–1966	Jacques Lipchitz	—N/a	Sculpture	—N/a	
More images	Rush Hour	Exchange House, Exchange Square 51.5201°N 0.0805°W	1983–1987	George Segal	—N/a	Sculptural group	—N/a	
More images	Fulcrum	Broadgate Octagon 51.5183°N 0.0837°W	1986–1987	Richard Serra	—N/a	Sculpture	—N/a	
	Ganapathi and Devi	Broadgate Plaza 51.52084°N 0.0799°W	1988	Stephen Cox	—N/a	Sculpture	—N/a	
	Leaping Hare on Crescent and Bell	Broadgate Circle 51.5185°N 0.0833°W	1988	Barry Flanagan	—N/a	Sculpture	—N/a	
More images	Broadgate Venus	Exchange Square 51.51972°N 0.08050°W	1989	Fernando Botero	—N/a	Recumbent statue	—N/a	
	Tiled fountain	Corner of Exchange House, junction of Primrose Street and Appold Street 51.5208°N 0.0816°W	1990	Joan Gardy Artigas		Tiled fountain	—N/a	
More images	The Broad Family	Exchange Square 51.5202°N 0.0822°W	1991	Xavier Corberó	—N/a	Sculptures	—N/a	
	Water feature	Exchange Square	1991	Stephen Cox	Skidmore, Owings & Merrill	Cascading water feature with sculpture	—N/a	
More images	Eye-I	Bishopsgate entrance to Pindar Plaza 51.5201°N 0.0792°W	1993	Bruce McLean	—N/a	Sculpture	—N/a	
	Chromorama	Sun Street 51.5198°N 0.0837°W	2015	David Batchelor	—N/a	Sculpture	—N/a	

=== Liverpool Street station ===
Image	Title / subject	Location and coordinates	Date	Artist / designer	Architect / other	Type	Designation	Notes
	Memorial to Charles Fryatt	West face of the Great Eastern Hotel, upper concourse level 51.5175°N 0.0819°W	1916–1917	H. T. H. van Golberdinge	—N/a	Memorial tablet with portrait roundel	Grade II	
More images	London Society of East Anglians War Memorial Men of Norfolk, Suffolk, Essex and Cambridgeshire	North face of the Great Eastern Hotel, upper concourse level 51.5177°N 0.0819°W	1920	Guy Dawber	—N/a	Plaque	Grade II	
More images	Great Eastern Railway War Memorial	West face of the Great Eastern Hotel, upper concourse level 51.5177°N 0.0822°W	1922	Farmer and Brindley	—N/a	War memorial	Grade II	
	Memorial to Sir Henry Wilson, 1st Baronet	West face of the Great Eastern Hotel, upper concourse level	1922–1923	Charles Leonard Hartwell	—N/a	Memorial tablet with portrait relief	Grade II	
More images	Für das Kind Kindertransport	51.5175°N 0.0819°W	2003 and 2011	Flor Kent	—N/a	Sculptural group	—N/a	
More images	Kindertransport – The Arrival	Hope Square, outside the station 51.5176°N 0.0826°W	2006	Frank Meisler and Arie Ovadia	—N/a	Sculptural group	—N/a	
More images	Infinite Accumulation	Outside the Elizabeth line eastern ticket hall 51.5178°N 0.0841°W	2024	Yayoi Kusama	—N/a	Sculpture	—N/a	

== Bread Street ==
Image	Title / subject	Location and coordinates	Date	Artist / designer	Architect / other	Type	Designation	Notes
	Statue of James I	Temple Bar Gate		John Bushnell	Joshua Marshall and Thomas Knight, with the possible involvement of Christopher Wren	Statue in niche	Grade I	
	Statue of Anne of Denmark	Temple Bar Gate		John Bushnell	Joshua Marshall and Thomas Knight, with the possible involvement of Christopher Wren	Statue in niche	Grade I	
	Statue of Charles I	Temple Bar Gate		John Bushnell	Joshua Marshall and Thomas Knight, with the possible involvement of Christopher Wren	Statue in niche	Grade I	
	Statue of Charles II	Temple Bar Gate		John Bushnell	Joshua Marshall and Thomas Knight, with the possible involvement of Christopher Wren	Statue in niche	Grade I	
More images	Panyer Alley Boy	Panyer Alley Steps 51.5148°N 0.0977°W	1688	?	—N/a	Relief sculpture	Grade II	
More images	St Lawrence and Mary Magdalene Drinking Fountain	Carter Lane Gardens 51.5129°N 0.0974°W	1866	Joseph Durham	John Robinson	Drinking fountain with sculpture	Grade II	
More images	Memorial to Admiral Arthur Phillip	Cannon Street Gardens 51.5131°N 0.0958°W	1932 (original memorial; most features of the present memorial date to 1968, 1976 and 2000)	Charles Leonard Hartwell, W. Hamilton Buchan and Sharon A. M. Keenan	?	Memorial with bust	—N/a	
More images	Wall fountain	Festival Gardens 51.5132°N 0.0970°W	1950	?	Albert Richardson	Fountain	—N/a	
More images	The Young Lovers	Festival Gardens 51.5133°N 0.0972°W	1950–1951	Georg Ehrlich	—N/a	Sculptural group	—N/a	
	Icarus III	Distaff Lane Garden 51.5124°N 0.0972°W	1973	Michael Ayrton	—N/a	Sculpture	—N/a	Moved from Old Change Court circa 2020, image shows original location.
More images	Paternoster	Paternoster Square 51.5146°N 0.0989°W	1975	Elisabeth Frink	—N/a	Sculptural group	—N/a	
More images	National Firefighters Memorial	Carter Lane Gardens 51.5129°N 0.0985°W	1990–1991	John W. Mills	—N/a	Sculptural group	—N/a	
More images	Paternoster Vents	Paternoster Square 51.5143°N 0.1005°W	2002	Thomas Heatherwick	—N/a	Vents	—N/a	
More images	Angel I to V	St Paul's Churchyard 51.5139°N 0.1000°W	2003	Emily Young	William Whitfield (commissioner)	Sculptures	—N/a	
	Noon-Mark	10 Paternoster Square	2003	Frank King (gnomon and astronomy) and Lida Lopes Cardozo Kindersley (letter-cutting)	Eric Parry Architects (commissioners)	Analemmatic sundial	—N/a	
More images	Paternoster Square Column	Paternoster Square 51.5147°N 0.0994°W	2003		William Whitfield and Andrew Lockwood	Column	—N/a	
	Lion, Unicorn and two City Dragons	Temple Bar Gate	2004	Tim Crawley	Freeland Rees Roberts (restoration)	Sculptures	Grade I	
	Amicale	The Queen's Diamond Jubilee Garden	2007	Paul Mount	—N/a	Sculpture	—N/a	Installed on this site in March 2012.
More images	Globe with Slots	Carter Lane Gardens	2009 or before	Paul Mount	—N/a	Sculpture	—N/a	
More images	Bust of John Donne	The Queen's Diamond Jubilee Garden 51.5133°N 0.0973°W	2012	Nigel Boonham	—N/a	Bust	—N/a	

=== One New Change ===
Image	Title / subject	Location and coordinates	Date	Artist / designer	Architect / other	Type	Designation	Notes
	Elizabeth II	One New Change	c. 1953–1960	Boris Anrep		Mosaic	—N/a	
	William III and Mary II	One New Change	c. 1953–1960	Boris Anrep		Mosaic	—N/a	
	Compass Rose	One New Change	c. 1953–1960	Boris Anrep		Mosaic	—N/a	
	Ariel	One New Change	c. 1953–1960	Boris Anrep		Mosaic	—N/a	
	Guardian Lion	One New Change	c. 1957	Charles Wheeler	Victor Heal (original setting)	Relief	—N/a	
	Saint George Triumphant	One New Change	c. 1957	Charles Wheeler	Victor Heal (original setting)	Relief	—N/a	
	Saint George Combatant	One New Change	c. 1957	Charles Wheeler	Victor Heal (original setting)	Relief	—N/a	
	Guardian Lion	One New Change	c. 1957	Charles Wheeler	Victor Heal (original setting)	Relief	—N/a	
	Nail	One New Change	2011	Gavin Turk	—N/a	Sculpture	—N/a	

== Bridge and Bridge Without ==
Image	Title / subject	Location and coordinates	Date	Artist / designer	Architect / other	Type	Designation	Notes
More images	The Monument Great Fire of London	Monument Yard 51.5101°N 0.0860°W	1671–1677	Caius Gabriel Cibber, Edward Pearce and George Bowers	Christopher Wren and Robert Hooke	Monumental column with basement astronomical observatory	Grade I Scheduled monument	
	Statue of James Hulbert	Garden of Fishmongers' Hall	1724	Robert Easton	—N/a	Statue		
More images	Mice	Philpot Lane, near junction with Eastcheap	1862	Uncertain, but thought to be John Young and Son				
	Female Figure holding a Globe	Adelaide House, London Bridge Approach	1921–1925	William Reid Dick	John James Burnet and Thomas S. Tait	Architectural sculpture	Grade II	

== Broad Street ==
Image	Title / subject	Location and coordinates	Date	Artist / designer	Architect / other	Type	Designation	Notes
	Credit Facilitating Transport, Commerce and Industry and sexfoil panels	7 Lothbury	1866	James Redfern	George Somers Leigh Clarke	Reliefs	Grade II*	
	"Persian" Atlas Figures	Drapers' Hall, Throgmorton Street	1898–1899	Henry Alfred Pegram	Thomas Graham Jackson	Architectural sculpture	Grade II*	
More images	Statue of Saint Augustine of Hippo	Augustine House, 6a Austin Friars	1955–1957	John Skeaping	Arthur Bailey	Architectural sculpture	—N/a	
More images	Augustinian Friar	4 Austin Friars	1989	T. Metcalfe	Fookes, Ness and Gough (1987–1990 refurbishment of Nos. 2–6)	Statue in niche	—N/a	
	Standing Stone	Austin Friars, outside Augustine House	2000	Richard Kindersley	—N/a	Standing stone	—N/a	Inscribed with words from T. S. Eliot's Four Quartets.
	Last of Light (3 Needles)	Angel Court	2017	Sara Barker	Fletcher Priest Architects	Architectural sculpture	—N/a	
	Selvedge with dark	Throgmorton Passage	2017	Sara Barker	Fletcher Priest Architects	Architectural sculpture	—N/a	

== Candlewick ==
Image	Title / subject	Location and coordinates	Date	Artist / designer	Architect / other	Type	Designation	Notes
	Chimera with Personifications of Fire and the Sea	24–28 Lombard Street 51.5124°N 0.0866°W	1914	Francis William Doyle Jones	Gordon & Gunton	Architectural sculpture	Grade II	
	Phoenix	Phoenix House, 5 King William Street	c. 1921–1922	Charles Henry Mabey	John Macvicar Anderson and Henry Lennox Anderson	Architectural sculpture	Grade II	
	Shield of the London Life Association	81 King William Street	1925–1927	Charles Leonard Hartwell	William Curtis Green	Architectural sculpture	—N/a	
	Unity and Security	81 King William Street	1925–1927	Herbert William Palliser	William Curtis Green	Architectural sculpture	—N/a	
	Wisdom and Foresight	81 King William Street	1925–1927	Herbert William Palliser	William Curtis Green	Architectural sculpture	—N/a	
	Break the Wall of Distrust	108 Cannon Street	1989–1990	Zurab Tsereteli		Architectural sculpture	—N/a	

== Castle Baynard ==
Image	Title / subject	Location and coordinates	Date	Artist / designer	Architect / other	Type	Designation	Notes
More images	Memorial to Robert Waithman	Salisbury Square 51.513509°N 0.106346°W	1833	—N/a	James Elmes	Obelisk	Grade II	
More images	Temperance drinking fountain	New Bridge Street 51.511362°N 0.104106°W	1861	Wills Brothers	—N/a	Drinking fountain with statue	Grade II	
	Capitals	Blackfriars Bridge	1860–1869	John Birnie Philip	Joseph Cubitt and H. Carr	Architectural sculpture	Grade II	
	Pegasus	Inner Temple Gateway, Tudor Street	1887	John Daymond and Son	?	Relief	Grade II	
More images	Statue of Queen Victoria	New Bridge Street 51.511°N 0.1044°W	1893–1896	Charles Bell Birch	—N/a	Statue	Grade II	
	Relief panel	Pemberton House, East Harding Street	1955	Wilfred Dudeney	Richard Seifert & Partners	Relief	—N/a	
	Youth	Pemberton House, East Harding Street	1955	Wilfred Dudeney	Richard Seifert & Partners	Sculpture	—N/a	
More images	The Seven Ages of Man	Baynard House, Queen Victoria Street 51.51188°N 0.10093°W	1980	Richard Kindersley	—N/a	Sculpture	—N/a	
More images	Taxi!	John Carpenter Street 51.5111°N 0.1061°W	1983	John Seward Johnson II	—N/a	Statue	—N/a	
More images	Saint George and the Dragon	Dorset Rise 51.51282°N 0.10569°W	1988	Michael Sandle	—N/a	Sculptural group	—N/a	
More images	Statue of Hodge	Gough Square 51.514722222222°N 0.1075°W	1997	Jon Bickley	—N/a	Statue	—N/a	
	Cantus	Shoe Lane	2002	Charles Hadcock	—N/a	Sculpture	—N/a	
More images	Resolution	Corner of St Bride Street and Shoe Lane 51.51554°N 0.10615°W	2007	Antony Gormley	—N/a	Sculpture	—N/a	
	Browsers	New Street Square	2008	Jonathan Clarke	—N/a	Sculptures	—N/a	
	Day and Night, Night and Day	New Street Square	2009	Ron Haselden		Neon sculpture	—N/a	
	Gateway	New Fetter Lane	2011	Jonathan Clarke	—N/a	Sculpture	—N/a	

=== Eastern end of Fleet Street to Ludgate Circus ===
Image	Title / subject	Location and coordinates	Date	Artist / designer	Architect / other	Type	Designation	Notes
	Putti	St Bartholomew House, 92 Fleet Street	1900	Gilbert Seale	H. Huntly Gordon	Architectural sculpture	Grade II	
	Statue of Mary, Queen of Scots	Queen of Scots House, 143–144 Fleet Street 51.514311°N 0.107181°W	1905	?	R. M. Roe	Statue in niche	Grade II	
	The Past and The Future	Daily Telegraph Building, 135–141 Fleet Street	1929–1930	Samuel Rabinovitch	Elcock and Sutcliffe	Architectural sculpture	Grade II	
	Panel with two Mercury figures and a globe; Panel with swallows	Daily Telegraph Building, 135–141 Fleet Street	1929–1930	A. J. Oakley?	Elcock and Sutcliffe	Architectural sculpture	Grade II	
More images	Memorial to Edgar Wallace	Ludgate House, 107 Fleet Street (at Ludgate Circus)	1934	Francis William Doyle-Jones		Plaque with portrait medallion	—N/a	
	Busts of King Lud	Leon restaurant, 12 Ludgate Circus (former King Lud pub)	1870		Lewis Henry Isaacs	Architectural sculpture	—N/a	
	Bust of T. P. O'Connor	Chronicle House, 72–78 Fleet Street 51.5141°N 0.10657°W	1935–1936	Francis William Doyle-Jones		Bust	—N/a	
	The Herald	85 Fleet Street	1938–1939	William Reid Dick	Edwin Lutyens	Architectural sculpture	Grade II	

=== St Paul's Cathedral ===
Image	Title / subject	Location and coordinates	Date	Artist / designer	Type	Designation	Notes
	Angels with the Royal Arms	Lunette within pediment of north front	1698	Grinling Gibbons	Relief	Grade I	
	Phoenix	Lunette within pediment of south front	1699	Caius Gabriel Cibber	Relief	Grade I	
	Saint Paul Preaching to the Bereans	Over great west door	1705–1706	Francis Bird	Relief	Grade I	
	The Conversion of Saint Paul	Pediment of west front	1706	Francis Bird	Relief	Grade I	
	Saul Receiving Letters from the High Priest	North side of the upper storey above the portico	Probably between 1706 and 1712	Francis Bird	Relief	Grade I	
	Ananias Putting His Hands on Saul and Restoring His Sight	South side of the upper storey above the portico	Probably between 1706 and 1712	Francis Bird	Relief	Grade I	
	Saint Paul and the Gaoler of Philippi	Inside the portico, on the north side wall	c. 1712/1713	Francis Bird	Relief	Grade I	
	Saint Paul Bitten by a Viper on Malta	Inside the portico, on the south side wall	c. 1712/1713	Francis Bird	Relief	Grade I	
	Saint Paul Before Felix	Within the portico, to the left of the great west door	1712–1713	Francis Bird	Relief	Grade I	
	Saint Paul Before Agrippa	Within the portico, to the right of the great west door	1712–1713	Francis Bird	Relief	Grade I	
	The Stoning of Saint Stephen	Over north door, west front	Possibly 1713	Francis Bird	Relief	Grade I	
	The Baptism of Saul	Over south door, west front	Possibly 1713	Francis Bird	Relief	Grade I	
	Saint Paul	Pediment of west front	1718–1721	Francis Bird	Statue	Grade I	
	Saint Peter	Pediment of west front	1718–1721	Francis Bird	Statue	Grade I	
	Saint James the Great	Pediment of west front	1718–1721	Francis Bird	Statue	Grade I	
	Saint Matthew	Parapet at the foot of the north tower, west front	1718–1721	Francis Bird	Statue	Grade I	
	Saint Mark	Parapet at the foot of the north tower, west front	1718–1721	Francis Bird	Statue	Grade I	
	Saint Luke	Parapet at the foot of the south tower, west front	1718–1721	Francis Bird	Statue	Grade I	
	Saint John the Evangelist	Parapet at the foot of the south tower, west front	1718–1721	Francis Bird	Statue	Grade I	
	Saint Barnabas	Eastern corner of north transept	1720–1724	Francis Bird, with some additions by Farmer & Brindley	Statue	Grade I	
	Saint Philip	Pediment of north front	1720–1724	Francis Bird, with some additions by Farmer & Brindley	Statue	Grade I	
	Saint James the Less	Pediment of north front	1720–1724	Francis Bird, with some additions by Farmer & Brindley	Statue	Grade I	
	Saint Jude	Pediment of north front	1720–1724	Francis Bird, with some additions by Farmer & Brindley	Statue	Grade I	
	Saint John the Baptist	Western corner of north transept	1720–1724	Francis Bird, with some additions by Farmer & Brindley	Statue	Grade I	
	Saint Simon	Western corner of south transept	Between 1722–1724 and 1923–1925	Francis Bird, with substantial additions by Henry Poole	Statue	Grade I	
	Saint Matthias	Eastern corner of south transept	Between 1722–1724 and 1923–1925	Francis Bird, with substantial additions by Henry Poole	Statue	Grade I	
	Saint Thomas	Pediment of south front	1898–1900	Farmer & Brindley after Francis Bird	Statue	Grade I	
	Saint Andrew	Pediment of south front	1898–1900	Farmer & Brindley after Francis Bird	Statue	Grade I	
	Saint Bartholomew	Pediment of south front	1898–1900	Farmer & Brindley after Francis Bird	Statue	Grade I	

=== St Paul's Churchyard ===
See also Emily Young's Angel series above, in the ward of Bread Street

Image	Title / subject	Location and coordinates	Date	Artist / designer	Architect / other	Type	Designation	Notes
More images	Statue of Queen Anne	St Paul's Churchyard 51.5137°N 0.0999°W	1884–1886 (after an original of 1709–1712)	Richard Claude Belt and L. A. Malempré, after Francis Bird	Christopher Wren	Statue flanked by other sculpture	Grade II	
More images	St Paul's Cross	St Paul's Churchyard 51.5142°N 0.0977°W	1908–1910	Bertram Mackennal	Reginald Blomfield	Statue on column	Grade II	
More images	Statue of Thomas Becket	St Paul's Churchyard 51.5135°N 0.0976°W	1971	Edward Bainbridge Copnall	—N/a	Statue	Grade II	
	Memorial to Londoners killed in World War II bombardments	St Paul's Churchyard	1999	Richard Kindersley	—N/a	Memorial	—N/a	
More images	Statue of John Wesley	St Paul's Churchyard 51.5143°N 0.09854°W	1988 (after an original of 1825–1849)	after Samuel Manning the Elder and Samuel Manning the Younger	—N/a	Statue	—N/a	
	Pavement showing the alignment of Old and New St Paul's Cathedral	Outside the South Transept of St Paul's Cathedral	2008	Richard Kindersley	—N/a	Inlaid stone installation	—N/a	Shows the plan of the medieval cathedral overlaid with the footprint of the present building.

== Cheap ==
Image	Title / subject	Location and coordinates	Date	Artist / designer	Architect / other	Type	Designation	Notes
	Putti crowning Queen Victoria, and symbolic flora	42–44 Gresham Street	1850–1852	?	Sancton Wood	Reliefs	Grade II	Banderoles inscribed THE QUEEN'S/ ASSURANCE/ ESTABLISHED/ AD 185 (sic).
	Keystones portraying Postmasters General and sprandrels with men writing and receiving letters Cecil Raikes and Alfred Morley	Nomura House, St Martin's Le Grand and King Edward Street	1889–1895	?	Henry Tanner	Architectural sculpture	—N/a	
	Atlas with Globe	King Street 51.5141°N 0.0923°W	1893–1894	Thomas Tyrrell for Farmer and Brindley	Alfred Waterhouse	Architectural sculpture	Grade II	
More images	Signs of the Zodiac	107 Cheapside	1955–1958	John Skeaping	Antony Lloyd of Curtis Green, Son & Lloyd	12 stone panels	—N/a	Originally installed with a figure of Apollo plus sun and star motifs, now lost, in the scheme.
	Three Printers	Goldsmiths' Hall garden (former churchyard of St John Zachary) 51.5160°N 0.0954°W	c. 1957	Wilfred Dudeney	—N/a	Sculptural group	—N/a	The only public monument to newspapers in Britain. Originally sited in New Street Square, the group was rescued by Christopher Wilson and moved to its present location in 2009.
	Relief of Thomas Becket	90 Cheapside 51.5136°N 0.0919°W		?		Plaque	—N/a	

== Coleman Street ==
Image	Title / subject	Location and coordinates	Date	Artist / designer	Architect / other	Type	Designation	Notes
	Architectural sculpture	Europe Arab Bank (originally the Metropolitan Life Assurance headquarters), 13 and 15 Moorgate	1890–1895	William Silver Frith	Aston Webb and Ingress Bell	Architectural sculpture	Grade II*	
	The Electric Telegraph, or Electricity and Engineering	Electra House, Moorgate	c. 1900–1903	George Frampton	John Belcher and John James Joass	Architectural sculpture	Grade II	
	Allegorical panels	Electra House, Moorgate	c. 1900–1903	F. W. Pomeroy	John Belcher and John James Joass	Architectural sculpture	Grade II	
	Egypt, Japan, India and China	Electra House, Moorgate	c. 1900–1903	William Goscombe John	John Belcher and John James Joass	Architectural sculpture	Grade II	
	Amorini with companies' arms and seals	Electra House, Moorgate	c. 1900–1903	Alfred Drury	John Belcher and John James Joass	Architectural sculpture	Grade II	
	Young atlantes with armilla and zodiacal globe	Electra House, Moorgate	c. 1900–1903	F. W. Pomeroy	John Belcher and John James Joass	Architectural sculpture	Grade II	
	Victory and Plenty	Salisbury House, London, Finsbury Circus	1901	?	Davis and Emmanuel	Architectural sculpture	Grade II	
More images	Drinking fountain	Finsbury Circus 51.518014°N 0.086091°W	1902	John Whitehead and Son	—N/a	Drinking fountain	Grade II	The shelter is based on the well head designed by Philip Webb for William Morris's Red House in Bexleyheath.
	Britannia (two versions)	Britannic House, Moorgate	1924	Francis Derwent Wood	Edwin Lutyens	Architectural sculpture	Grade II*	
	Indian Water-carrier	Britannic House, Moorgate	1924	Francis Derwent Wood	Edwin Lutyens	Architectural sculpture	Grade II*	
More images	Persian Scarf-dancer	Britannic House, Moorgate	c. 1924	Francis Derwent Wood	Edwin Lutyens	Architectural sculpture	Grade II*	
	Woman and Baby or Spring	Britannic House, Moorgate	c. 1924	Francis Derwent Wood	Edwin Lutyens	Architectural sculpture	Grade II*	
	Decorative keystones	Britannic House, Moorgate	c. 1924	Messrs Broadbent & Sons	Edwin Lutyens	Architectural sculpture	Grade II*	
	Lighthouse	42 Moorgate 51.5166°N 0.0889°W	1928	?	Aston Webb	Architectural sculpture	—N/a	Built as the headquarter of Ocean Accident and Guarantee Corporation. Possibly previously had a working light.
	Neptune	42 Moorgate 51.5166°N 0.0889°W	1928	?	Aston Webb	Architectural sculpture	—N/a	Built as the headquarter of Ocean Accident and Guarantee Corporation.
More images	The Gardener	Brewers' Hall Garden, London Wall, near the junction with Moorgate 51.5172°N 0.0925°W	1971–1972	Karin Jonzen	—N/a	Statue	—N/a	
	Doors and screens	2 Moorgate	1973–1975	John Poole	Fitzroy Robinson & Partners	Bronze doors and screens	Grade II	Commissioned by Brown, Shipley & Co. The design on the doors is intended to represent "the interaction of spheres of influence".
	Doors	1 Moorgate	1980s	?	Mountford and Gruning	Bronze doors	Grade II	Thought to have been installed by the Banco di Napoli.
More images	Memorial to George Dance the Younger	Circus Place 51.5172°N 0.0867°W	1999	Mel Morris Jones	?	Obeliscal ventilation shaft	—N/a	
	Manifold (Major Third) 5:4	Moorgate entrance of Liverpool Street station	2018	Conrad Shawcross		Sculpture	—N/a	Installed 2023. A representation of a piano chord falling into silence, created using a machine based on a Victorian harmonograph.
More images	Memorial to John Keats	Moorgate 51.517694°N 0.089197°W	2024	Martin Jennings	—N/a	Sculpture	—N/a	Copy of a life mask of the poet at 21.

=== Chartered Accountants' Hall ===
Image	Title / subject	Location and coordinates	Date	Artist / designer	Architect / other	Type	Designation	Notes
	Allegorical frieze	Moorgate Place and Great Swan Alley	c. 1888–1893	Hamo Thornycroft	John Belcher and Arthur Beresford Pite	Reliefs	Grade II*	Sections represent the Arts, the Sciences, Crafts, Education, Commerce, Manufactures, Agriculture, Mining, Accountancy, Railways, Shipping, India and the Colonies and Building.
	Boys with Coat of Arms	Moorgate Place	1890–1892	Harry Bates	John Belcher and Arthur Beresford Pite	Architectural sculpture	Grade II*	
	Corbel with winged, fish-tailed atlantes	Corner of Great Swan Alley and Moorgate Place	1890–1892	Harry Bates	John Belcher and Arthur Beresford Pite	Architectural sculpture	Grade II*	
	Eleven terms	Great Swan Alley	1890–1892	Harry Bates	John Belcher and Arthur Beresford Pite	Architectural sculpture	Grade II*	
	Brackets and corbel of niche	Great Swan Alley, over the entrance	1890–1892	Attributed to Harry Bates	John Belcher and Arthur Beresford Pite	Architectural sculpture	Grade II*	The niche was intended to house a bronze statue of Queen Victoria, which was never realised.
	Justice	Corner of Great Swan Alley and Moorgate Place	1892–1893	Hamo Thornycroft	John Belcher and Arthur Beresford Pite	Statue	Grade II*	
	Architecture frieze	Great Swan Alley	1930–1931	James Alexander Stephenson	John James Joass	Relief	Grade II*	
	Six terms	Great Swan Alley	1930–1931	Possibly by James Alexander Stephenson	John James Joass	Reliefs	Grade II*	
	Three historical panels	Great Swan Alley	1969	David McFall	William Whitfield	Reliefs	Grade II*	

== Cordwainer ==
Image	Title / subject	Location and coordinates	Date	Artist / designer	Architect / other	Type	Designation	Notes
	Royal progresses of Edward VI, Elizabeth I, Charles II and Queen Victoria	1 Poultry	1875	Joseph Kremer	F. Chancellor (original building, 12–13 Poultry); James Stirling, Michael Wilford and Associates (current building)	Reliefs	Grade II*	
	Hutton Panels	Bank station (relocated from Bucklersbury House)	1960	John Hutton	—N/a	Engraved and etched glass panels	—N/a	
More images	Statue of Captain John Smith	Bow Churchyard 51.5137°N 0.0939°W	1960 (after an original of 1907)	Charles Renick after William Couper	—N/a	Statue	Grade II	
More images	The Cordwainer	Watling Street 51.5125°N 0.0928°W	2002	Alma Boyes	—N/a	Statue	—N/a	
More images	Forgotten Streams	Bloomberg London	2017	Cristina Iglesias	Foster and Partners	Sculpture	—N/a	

== Cornhill ==
Image	Title / subject	Location and coordinates	Date	Artist / designer	Architect / other	Type	Designation	Notes
	Relief with two sailors	37–38 Threadneedle Street	c. 1803	John Bacon and a later restorer	John Macvicar Anderson?	Architectural sculpture	Grade II	
More images	Statue of Arthur Wellesley, 1st Duke of Wellington	In front of the Royal Exchange 51.5108°N 0.0878°W	1837–1844	Francis Leggatt Chantrey and Henry Weekes	—N/a	Equestrian sculpture	Grade II	
	Pedimental sculpture	Royal Exchange	1842–1844	Richard Westmacott Jr.	William Tite	Pedimental sculpture	Grade I	
	Statue of Richard Whittington	Royal Exchange	1844	John Edward Carew	William Tite	Statue in niche	Grade I	
	Statue of Thomas Gresham	Royal Exchange	1844–1845	William Behnes	William Tite	Statue in niche	Grade I	
	Statue of Hugh Myddelton	Royal Exchange	1844–1845	Samuel Joseph	William Tite	Statue in niche	Grade I	
	Saint Michael Disputing with Satan About the Body of Moses; Blessing Christ; Adoring Angels	St Michael, Cornhill	1856–1858	John Birnie Philip	George Gilbert Scott	Architectural sculpture	Grade I	
	Spandrel figures with camels	40 Threadneedle Street (formerly the Oriental Bank Corporation), in the alley leading to Adam's Court	1858–1859	?	?	Architectural sculpture	Grade II	
More images	Statue of George Peabody	Royal Exchange Buildings 51.513943°N 0.086479°W	1869	William Wetmore Story	—N/a	Statue	Grade II	
	Spandrel figures and mascarons	Former Royal Bank of Scotland, 3 and 5 Bishopsgate	1877	F. G. Anstey	Thomas Chatfeild-Clarke	Architectural sculpture	Grade II	
More images	Charity	Royal Exchange Buildings 51.513916°N 0.086604°W	1878–1879	Jules Dalou	James Edmeston	Drinking fountain	Grade II	
	Atlas Herms ("Persians")	71–73 Cornhill	1896	Henry Pegram	Goymour Cuthbert	Architectural sculpture	Grade II	
More images	Metropolitan Drinking Fountain and Cattle Trough Association's Jubilee Drinking Fountain	Royal Exchange Buildings 51.5135°N 0.0865°W	1909–1911	Stephen R. Melton (current sculpture); J. Whitehead & Sons (original sculpture)	J. Whitehead & Sons	Drinking fountain with sculpture	Grade II	
More images	Thomas Gray Birthplace Memorial	41 Cornhill	1917–1918	Frederick William Pomeroy	Sydney Perks	Plaque with portrait medallion	Grade II	
More images	London Troops War Memorial	Outside the Royal Exchange 51.5135°N 0.0881°W	1919–1920	Alfred Drury and William Silver Frith	Aston Webb	War memorial	Grade II*	
More images	St Michael Cornhill War Memorial	St Michael, Cornhill 51.5131°N 0.0856°W	1920	Richard Reginald Goulden	—N/a	War memorial with sculpture	Grade II*	
	Boy and Duck	Adam's Court	1922 (?)	After Pierino da Vinci	—N/a	Fountain with sculpture	—N/a	Replica of a fountain in the Palazzo Pitti, Florence.
More images	Bust of Abraham Lincoln	Royal Exchange	1928	Andrew O'Connor	—N/a	Bust	—N/a	
More images	Bust of Paul Reuter	Royal Exchange Buildings 51.5136°N 0.0864°W	1976	Michael Black	Theo Crosby	Herm bust	—N/a	
	Demeter	62–64 Cornhill	1989	Don Brown and Kevin Gordon (supervised by Terry Powell)	Rolfe Judd	Architectural sculpture	—N/a	
More images	Statue of James Henry Greathead	Cornhill 51.5133°N 0.0880°W	1993–1994	James Butler	—N/a	Statue	—N/a	
More images	City Wing	Corner of Old Broad Street and Threadneedle Walk 51.5142°N 0.0861°W	2013	Christopher Le Brun	Eric Parry Architects	Sculpture	—N/a	

=== Gibson Hall ===
Image	Title / subject	Location and coordinates	Date	Artist / designer	Architect / other	Type	Designation	Notes
	Manchester	Gibson Hall, 13 Bishopsgate	1864–1865	Henry Bursill or Felix Martin Miller	John Gibson	Sculptural group	Grade I	
	England	Gibson Hall, 13 Bishopsgate	1864–1865	Henry Bursill or Felix Martin Miller	John Gibson	Sculptural group	Grade I	
	Wales	Gibson Hall, 13 Bishopsgate	1864–1865	Henry Bursill or Felix Martin Miller	John Gibson	Sculptural group	Grade I	
	Birmingham	Gibson Hall, 13 Bishopsgate	1864–1865	Henry Bursill or Felix Martin Miller	John Gibson	Statue	Grade I	
	Newcastle and the Pottery Districts	Gibson Hall, 13 Bishopsgate	1864–1865	Henry Bursill or Felix Martin Miller	John Gibson	Statue	Grade I	
	Dover	Gibson Hall, 13 Bishopsgate	1864–1865	Henry Bursill or Felix Martin Miller	John Gibson	Statue	Grade I	
	Birmingham	Gibson Hall, 13 Bishopsgate	1864–1865	Henry Bursill or Felix Martin Miller	John Gibson	Statue	Grade I	
	London	Gibson Hall, 13 Bishopsgate	1864–1865	Henry Bursill or Felix Martin Miller	John Gibson	Sculptural group	Grade I	
	The Arts	Gibson Hall, 13 Bishopsgate	1864–1865	John Hancock	John Gibson	Relief	Grade I	
	Commerce	Gibson Hall, 13 Bishopsgate	1864–1865	John Hancock	John Gibson	Relief	Grade I	
	Science	Gibson Hall, 13 Bishopsgate	1864–1865	John Hancock	John Gibson	Relief	Grade I	
	Manufactures	Gibson Hall, 13 Bishopsgate	1864–1865	John Hancock	John Gibson	Relief	Grade I	
	Agriculture	Gibson Hall, 13 Bishopsgate	1864–1865	John Hancock	John Gibson	Relief	Grade I	
	Navigation	Gibson Hall, 13 Bishopsgate	1864–1865	John Hancock	John Gibson	Relief	Grade I	
	Shipbuilding	Gibson Hall, 13 Bishopsgate	1878	Charles Henry Mabey	John Gibson	Statue	Grade I	
	Mining	Gibson Hall, 13 Bishopsgate	1878	Charles Henry Mabey	John Gibson	Statue	Grade I	
	Shipbuilding	Gibson Hall, 13 Bishopsgate	1878	Charles Henry Mabey	John Gibson	Relief	Grade I	
	Mining	Gibson Hall, 13 Bishopsgate	1878	Charles Henry Mabey	John Gibson	Relief	Grade I	

== Cripplegate ==
Image	Title / subject	Location and coordinates	Date	Artist / designer	Architect / other	Type	Designation	Notes
	Science and Art; Education accompanied by Art and Science	Former Cripplegate Institute (now UBS), Golden Lane	1894–1896 and 1910–1911	?	Sidney R. J. Smith and F. Hammond	Architectural sculpture	Grade II	
	Saint Giles	St Giles-without-Cripplegate	1951–1960 (?)	?	Probably Godfrey Allen	Statue in niche	Grade I	
More images	Fleet Building Murals	Cromwell Highwalk, Barbican Estate (relocated from Fleet Building, Farringdon Street)	c. 1960	Dorothy Annan	—N/a	Ceramic mural panels	Grade II	
	Ascent	Ben Jonson Place, Barbican Centre	1990	Charlotte Mayer	—N/a	Sculpture	—N/a	
More images	The Barbican Muse	Gilbert Highwalk, Barbican Centre 51.5196°N 0.0929°W	1993–1994	Matthew Spender	—N/a	suspended sculptures	—N/a	

== Dowgate ==
Image	Title / subject	Location and coordinates	Date	Artist / designer	Architect / other	Type	Designation	Notes
	Pediment with the company arms and decorative frieze	Skinners' Hall, Dowgate Hill	1778–1779	?	William Jupp	Relief sculpture	Grade I	
More images	Memorial to the dead of St John the Baptist upon Walbrook	Cloak Lane 51.5115904°N 0.091207416°W	1884	—N/a	?	Monument	Grade II	
More images	LIFFE Trader	Dowgate Hill 51.5107°N 0.0912°W	1997	Stephen Melton	—N/a	Statue	—N/a	Formerly located on Walbrook in Cordwainer ward. Relocated to the Guildhall, and then to its current site on Dowgate Hill in 2021.
More images	Magister Equitum	Whittington Garden	2005 (after an original of 1924)	After Duilio Cambellotti	—N/a	Sculpture	—N/a	
More images	The Plumber's Apprentice	Cannon Street station	2011	Martin Jennings	—N/a	Statue	—N/a	Commissioned by the Worshipful Company of Plumbers to mark its 400th anniversary; the guild's last livery hall stood on the site now occupied by the station.

== Farringdon Within ==
Image	Title / subject	Location and coordinates	Date	Artist / designer	Architect / other	Type	Designation	Notes
More images	Relief of Guy of Warwick	7 Newgate Street, at Warwick Lane	1688	?	Fitzroy Robinson (7 Newgate Street, 2000)	Relief	—N/a	
More images	Statue of Rowland Hill	King Edward Street 51.5163°N 0.0986°W	1882	Edward Onslow Ford	—N/a	Statue	Grade II	
More images	Frieze	Cutlers' Hall, Warwick Lane	1887	Benjamin Creswick or George Tinworth	T. Tayler Smith	Relief sculpture	Grade II	
	Tympanum and grotesque reliefs on metopes	The Black Friar pub, corner of Queen Victoria Street and New Bridge Street	1904–1905	Nathaniel Hitch	Herbert Fuller-Clark	Architectural sculpture	Grade II*	
	Fretted sign plaques with friars	The Black Friar pub, corner of Queen Victoria Street and New Bridge Street	1904–1905(?)	?	Herbert Fuller-Clark	Architectural sculpture	Grade II*	
	Allegorical reliefs of infants	Meridian House, 34–35 Farringdon Street (formerly the offices of Babcock & Wilcox)	1921–1922	George Alexander	Victor Wilkins	Architectural relief sculptures	—N/a	
	Frieze with chess piece motifs	St Paul's House, Warwick Lane	1963	Alan Collins	Victor Heal	Relief sculpture	—N/a	
	The Black Friar	The Black Friar pub, corner of Queen Victoria Street and New Bridge Street	1983(?)	?	Herbert Fuller-Clark	Statue	Grade II*	
	Stained glass canopies	Façade of 100 New Bridge Street	1991–1992	Brian Clarke	Renton Howard Wood Levin	Stained glass	—N/a	Two-part composition along the principal elevation.
	Ceramic murals	Waithman Street façade of 100 New Bridge Street	1992	Rupert Spira	Renton Howard Wood Levin	Ceramic murals	—N/a	
	Newgate Street Clock	Newgate Street 51.51552°N 0.09898°W	2007	Smith of Derby	—N/a	"Wandering hour" clock	—N/a	
	Christ's Hospital Memorial	Garden of Christ Church Greyfriars	2017	Andrew Brown	—N/a	Sculpture	—N/a	

=== Old Bailey ===
Image	Title / subject	Location and coordinates	Date	Artist / designer	Architect / other	Type	Designation	Notes
	Rail Travel and Sea Travel	Britannia House, 16–17 Old Bailey		?	Arthur Usher	Architectural sculptures	Grade II	
More images	Justice	Central Criminal Court, Old Bailey, on lantern atop the dome	1905–1906	Frederick William Pomeroy	Edward William Mountford	Statue	Grade II*	
	Fortitude, Truth and the Recording Angel	Central Criminal Court, Old Bailey, over the main door	1905–1906	Frederick William Pomeroy	Edward William Mountford	Architectural sculpture	Grade II*	
	Allegorical Figure	Central Criminal Court, Old Bailey, north pediment	1906	Frederick William Pomeroy	Edward William Mountford	Architectural sculpture	Grade II*	
	Allegorical Figure	Central Criminal Court, Old Bailey, south pediment	1906	Frederick William Pomeroy	Edward William Mountford	Architectural sculpture	Grade II*	
	Frieze	Central Criminal Court, Old Bailey, recessed centre bay of the main façade	1906	Alfred Turner	Edward William Mountford	Architectural sculpture	Grade II*	
	Man with Pipe	In front of 20 Old Bailey (Fleet Place development)	1992	Bruce MacLean	—N/a	Sculpture	—N/a	
	Echo	Rear of 6 Old Bailey (Fleet Place development)	1993	Stephen Cox	—N/a	Sculpture	—N/a	
	Zuni-Zennor	10 Fleet Place	1993	Eilis O'Connor	?	Architectural sculpture	—N/a	

=== St Bartholomew-the-Great ===
Image	Title / subject	Location and coordinates	Date	Artist / designer	Architect / other	Type	Designation	Notes
	Statue of Rahere	West Porch of St Bartholomew-the-Great, overlooking the church path	1893	William Silver Frith	Aston Webb	Statue in niche	Grade I	
	Statue of Saint Bartholomew	North Porch of St Bartholomew-the-Great, overlooking Cloth Fair	1893	William Silver Frith	Aston Webb	Statue in niche	Grade I	
	Statue of Saint Bartholomew	Gatehouse of St Bartholomew-the-Great, overlooking West Smithfield	1917	William Silver Frith	Aston Webb	Statue in niche	Grade II*	
	War memorial	Gatehouse of St Bartholomew-the-Great, facing West Smithfield	1917	William Silver Frith	Aston Webb	Crucifix	Grade II*	

== Farringdon Without ==
=== Chancery Lane ===
Image	Title / subject	Location and coordinates	Date	Artist / designer	Architect / other	Type	Designation	Notes
	Decorative sculpture on central block	Maughan Library	1852–1853	John Thomas	James Pennethorne	Architectural sculpture	Grade II*	
	Statues of Queen Victoria, Elizabeth I, the Empress Matilda and Queen Anne	Maughan Library	1866–1867	Joseph Durham	James Pennethorne	Statues	Grade II*	
	America, Australasia, Europe, Africa, India and Canada	Maughan Library	1886	Attributed to Walter Crane	—N/a	Stucco panels	—N/a	
	Statues of Henry III and Edward III	Maughan Library	1891–1896	Farmer & Brindley	John Taylor	Statues in niches	Grade II*	
	Reach Up	Maughan Library	2004	Dorothy Brook	—N/a	Sculpture	—N/a	
	Statue of Confucius	Maughan Library	2010	?	—N/a	Statue	—N/a	
	Travertine Frieze	40 Chancery Lane	2015	Susanna Heron	Bennetts Associates	Relief	—N/a	

=== Fetter Lane ===
Image	Title / subject	Location and coordinates	Date	Artist / designer	Architect / other	Type	Designation	Notes
More images	Architectural sculpture	80 Fetter Lane	1902	John Daymond & Son	Treadwell & Martin	Relief sculptures	Grade II	
More images	Statue of John Wilkes	Fetter Lane 51.5159°N 0.1092°W	1988	James Butler	—N/a	Statue	—N/a	

=== Holborn ===
Image	Title / subject	Location and coordinates	Date	Artist / designer	Architect / other	Type	Designation	Notes
	Doom	St Andrew, Holborn	late 17th century	?		Relief sculpture	Grade I	
	Charity Boy	St Andrew, Holborn	after 1721	?		Statue	Grade I	
	Charity Girl	St Andrew, Holborn	after 1721	?		Statue	Grade I	
	Dragon boundary mark on south side of road	High Holborn 51.518079°N 0.11127°W	mid-19th century (obelisk support)	?	?	Statue on obelisk	Grade II	
More images	Drinking fountain	Churchyard of St Sepulchre-without-Newgate	1859	Wills Brothers		Drinking fountain	Grade II	
	Fine Art	Holborn Viaduct	1868–1869	Farmer & Brindley	William Haywood	Statue	Grade II	
	Science	Holborn Viaduct	1868–1869	Farmer & Brindley	William Haywood	Statue	Grade II	
	Agriculture	Holborn Viaduct	1868–1869	Farmer & Brindley	William Haywood	Statue	Grade II	
	Commerce	Holborn Viaduct	1868–1869	Farmer & Brindley	William Haywood	Statue	Grade II	
	Winged lions	Holborn Viaduct	1868–1870	Farmer & Brindley	William Haywood	Statues	Grade II	
	Coat of arms of the City of London	Holborn Viaduct	1869	Farmer & Brindley	William Haywood	Relief	Grade II	
	Statue of Thomas Gresham	Holborn Viaduct step-building	1869	Henry Bursill	William Haywood	Statue in niche		
	Statue of Henry Fitz-Ailwin de Londonestone	Holborn Viaduct step-building	1869	Henry Bursill	William Haywood	Statue in niche		
	Seated dragons with spears	Holborn Viaduct step-buildings	1869	Farmer & Brindley	William Haywood	Architectural sculpture		
	Keystone heads	Holborn Viaduct step-buildings	1869	probably Farmer & Brindley	William Haywood	Architectural sculpture		
	Atlantes	Holborn Viaduct step-buildings	1869, 2000 and ?2014	Henry Bursill, Carving Workshop and ?	William Haywood and ?	Atlantes		
More images	Statue of Albert, Prince Consort	Holborn Circus	1869–1874	Charles Bacon	Philip Charles Hardwick and William Haywood	Equestrian statue with other sculpture	Grade II	
	Saint Andrew	St Andrew Court House, St Andrew Street	1870		Samuel Sanders Teulon	Statue in niche	Grade II	
	Faith Enthroned Between Hope and Charity	City Temple, Holborn Viaduct	1873–1874	?	Lockwood & Mason	Pediment sculpture	Grade II	
More images	Royal Fusiliers War Memorial	High Holborn	1920–1922	Albert Toft	Cheadle and Harding	Statue	Grade II	
	Reliefs of Africans and Europeans	Former Diamond Trading Company and Anglo-American Corporation of South Africa building, Holborn Viaduct	1956–1957	Esmond Burton	T. P. Bennett	Relief sculptures	—N/a	
	Statue of William Walworth	Holborn Viaduct step-building	2000	Carving Workshop, after Henry Bursill		Statue in niche	—N/a	
	Statue of Sir Hugh Myddelton, 1st Baronet	Holborn Viaduct step-building	?2014	after Henry Bursill		Statue in niche	—N/a	

=== Smithfield ===
Image	Title / subject	Location and coordinates	Date	Artist / designer	Architect / other	Type	Designation	Notes
More images	Golden Boy of Pye Corner	1 Cock Lane 51.5171°N 0.1019°W	Late 17th century	?		Statue in niche	Grade II	
More images	Statue of Henry VIII	St Bartholomew's Hospital	1702–1703	Francis Bird		Statue in niche	Grade I	
	Lameness and Disease	St Bartholomew's Hospital	1702–1703	Possibly Edward Strong, Jr.		Statue in niche	Grade I	
More images	Fountain	St Bartholomew's Hospital 51.51746°N 0.100114°W	1859	Attributed to John Thomas	Philip Charles Hardwick	Fountain with sculpture	Grade II	
	London	East Building, Smithfield Market	1868	C. S. Kelsey	Horace Jones	Architectural sculpture	Grade II*	
	Edinburgh	East Building, Smithfield Market	1868	C. S. Kelsey	Horace Jones	Architectural sculpture	Grade II*	
	Dublin	East Building, Smithfield Market	1868	C. S. Kelsey	Horace Jones	Architectural sculpture	Grade II*	
	Liverpool	East Building, Smithfield Market	1868	C. S. Kelsey	Horace Jones	Architectural sculpture	Grade II*	
	Memorial to John Rogers, John Bradford, John Philpot and other Marian martyrs	St Bartholomew's Hospital	1870	?	Habershon and Pite	Memorial tablet	Grade II	
More images	Peace drinking fountain	West Smithfield Gardens 51.5185°N 0.1012°W	1871–1873	John Birnie Philip and Farmer & Brindley	Francis Butler	Drinking fountain with sculpture	Grade II	
More images	Smithfield Market War Memorial	Grand Avenue, Smithfield Market 51.5180°N 0.1018°W	1921	G. Hawkings & Son		War memorial		Unveiled 22 July 1921.
More images	Charles Lamb Centenary Memorial	Giltspur Street	1935	William Reynolds-Stephens		Bust in niche with architectural framework	Grade I	
More images	Memorial to William Wallace	St Bartholomew's Hospital	1956	?		Memorial tablet	Grade II	
More images	Memorial to the Peasants' Revolt	St Bartholomew's Hospital	2015	Emily Hoffnung		Incised slate tablets	—N/a	Unveiled 15 July 2015 by Ken Loach. Wat Tyler was killed near this spot.

=== Temple and western end of Fleet Street ===
Image	Title / subject	Location and coordinates	Date	Artist / designer	Architect / other	Type	Designation	Notes
	Statues of King Lud, Androgeus and Theomantius/Tenvantius	St Dunstan-in-the-West, Fleet Street	probably 1586	?		Statues	Grade I	
More images	Statue of Elizabeth I	St Dunstan-in-the-West, Fleet Street	1670–1699	?	probably John Shaw Jr.	Statue in niche	Grade I	
	Clock figures	St Dunstan-in-the-West, Fleet Street	1671 (modified in 1738)	Thomas Harrys		Wooden figures	Grade I	
More images	Temple Fountain	Fountain Court, Middle Temple	1681	?	—N/a	Fountain	Grade II	Thought to be the oldest permanent fountain in London. The characters Ruth Pinch and John Westlock met here in Dickens's Martin Chuzzlewit (1842–1844).
	Lamb and Flag keystone	Middle Temple Gateway, Fleet Street	1683–1684	?	Roger North	Relief on keystone	Grade I	
	Black man supporting a sundial	Inner Temple Garden, near Paper Buildings	Early 18th century?	Attributed to John Nost	—N/a	Statue with sundial	—N/a	Said to have been bought by the Earl of Clare in 1705 and given to Clement's Inn in recompense after the Earl's Indian servant had killed two of the Inn's students. Moved to this site in about 1905.
	Monument to John Hiccocks Master in Chancery	Inner Temple Lane 51.513503°N 0.110064°W	Early 18th century	?	—N/a	Recumbent effigy	Grade II	
	Sir James Duke Drinking Fountain	In front of St Dunstan-in-the-West	1859–1860	—N/a	John Shaw Jr.	Drinking fountain	Grade II	
	Learning and Justice	Temple Gardens	1878–1879	William Calder Marshall	Edward Middleton Barry	Statues in niches	Grade II	
	Architectural sculpture	Temple Gardens	1878–1879	Mabey & Co.	Edward Middleton Barry	Architectural sculpture	Grade II	
More images	City Dragon	Temple Bar Marker	1879–1880	Charles Bell Birch	Horace Jones	Statue	Grade II	
More images	Statue of Queen Victoria	Temple Bar Marker	1879–1880	Joseph Edgar Boehm	Horace Jones	Statue	Grade II	
More images	Statue of Edward VII as Prince of Wales	Temple Bar Marker	1879–1880	Joseph Edgar Boehm	Horace Jones	Statue	Grade II	
	Statues of Christ, Solomon, Alfred the Great and Moses	Royal Courts of Justice	1882	?	George Edmund Street	Architectural sculptures	Grade I	
	Prudence, Justice and Liberality	49–50 Fleet Street (Norwich Union)	1913	A. Stanley Young	Jack McMullen Brooks	Relief sculpture		
	Memorial to Charles Lamb	Inner Temple Garden	1928 (present sculpture a copy of 1971)	Margaret Wrightson	—N/a	Statue	—N/a	
More images	Memorial to Alfred Harmsworth, 1st Baron Northcliffe	St Dunstan-in-the-West, Fleet Street	1929–1930	Kathleen Scott	Edwin Lutyens	Memorial with bust	Grade I	
	Keystones	Serjeant's Inn	1951–1958	?	Devereux & Davis	Relief sculptures on keystones	—N/a	
More images	Monument for the Millennium	Temple Court 51.5129°N 0.1102°W	1999	Nicola Hicks	Ptolemy Dean	Column with sculptural group	—N/a	
More images	Justice	Hare Court, Inner Temple 51.5127°N 0.1097°W	2007	Tanya Russell	—N/a	Sculpture	—N/a	

== Langbourn ==
Image	Title / subject	Location and coordinates	Date	Artist / designer	Architect / other	Type	Designation	Notes
	Mercers' Maiden	Corbet Court	1669	?		Relief	—N/a	
	Electricity and Speed	Façade of the former Bank tube station, King William Street	1899	Oliver Wheatley	Sidney R. J. Smith	Reliefs	—N/a	
	Japanese Figures	Asia House, 31–33 Lime Street	1912–1913	John Broad	Fair and Myer	Reliefs	—N/a	
	Architectural sculpture	28–30 Cornhill (Scottish Widows Fund), including the back of the building at Change Alley	1934–1935	William McMillan	William Curtis Green	Architectural sculpture	Grade II	
More images	Doors with scenes from the history of Cornhill	32 Cornhill	1939	Walter Gilbert after designs by B. P. Arnold	?	Carved wooden doors	—N/a	
	Street signs George and Dragon; Crown and Thistle; Bell and Rope; Acorn; George and Vulture	George Yard entrance of Barclays Bank, 54 Lombard Street	1959–1964	Charles Wheeler	A. T. Scott and V. Helbing (original setting)	Reliefs	—N/a	Representing earlier occupants of the site, the signs are survivals from the Barclays building that previously stood here, incorporated into its successor built from 1986 to 1994.
More images	Gilt of Cain	Fen Court, Fenchurch Street	2008	Gareth Howat, Lemn Sissay and Michael Visocchi	—N/a	Memorial	—N/a	Commemorates the bicentenary of the Slave Trade Act 1807, which abolished the transatlantic slave trade.

== Lime Street ==
Image	Title / subject	Location and coordinates	Date	Artist / designer	Architect / other	Type	Designation	Notes
More images	Navigation	Leadenhall Street	Early 20th century	Percy George Bentham		Architectural sculpture	—N/a	Originally installed at the P&O headquarters at the junction of Leadenhall Street and St Mary Axe.
	Allegorical group	Lloyd's building, Leadenhall Street	1925–1928	Charles Doman	Edwin Cooper	Pedimental sculpture	Grade I	A globe in the centre is flanked by a reclining male figure (Shipping, accompanied by an owl for Wisdom) and a mirroring female figure (Commerce, accompanied by a lion for Courage and a beehive for Industry).
	Roebuck and Ram	Leathersellers' Hall, 7 St Helen's Place	2000	Mark Coreth		Sculptures	—N/a	The heraldic beasts of the Worshipful Company of Leathersellers.
	The Flesher	St Helen's Place	2017	Etienne Millner	—N/a	Statue	—N/a	Unveiled 16 May 2017 by the Earl of Wessex.
	Absent	St Mary Axe	2018	Nicholas Dimbleby	—N/a	Sculpture	—N/a	Marks the centenary of the Armistice of 11 November 1918.

== Portsoken ==
Image	Title / subject	Location and coordinates	Date	Artist / designer	Architect / other	Type	Designation	Notes
	Charity Boy	The Aldgate School, Duke's Place	c. 1710–1711	?	Arthur William Cooksey (1908 setting)	Statue in niche	Grade II*	
	Charity Girl	The Aldgate School, Duke's Place	c. 1710–1711	?	Arthur William Cooksey (1908 setting)	Statue in niche	Grade II*	
More images	Frederic David Mocatta Memorial Fountain	Aldgate High Street, outside St Botolph's Aldgate	1906	?	?	Drinking fountain	—N/a	
	Ridirich	Little Somerset Street	1980	Keith McCarter	—N/a	Sculpture	—N/a	
More images	Sanctuary	St Botolph's Aldgate churchyard	1985	Naomi Blake	—N/a	Sculpture	—N/a	

== Queenhithe ==
Image	Title / subject	Location and coordinates	Date	Artist / designer	Architect / other	Type	Designation	Notes
More images	Tylers and Bricklayers Millennium Sundial	Paul's Walk	1999	Piers Nicholson	Royal Engineers	Polar sundial	—N/a	
More images	HSBC Gates	Queen Victoria Street, on the approach to the Millennium Bridge	1999–2000	Anthony Caro, assisted by Gavin Morris	—N/a	Sculpture	—N/a	
More images	Queenhithe Dock Mosaic	Queenhithe	2011–2014	London School of Mosaic	—N/a	Mosaic	—N/a	Unveiled 18 November 2014. A 30m-long mosaic telling the history of the dock.

== Tower ==
Image	Title / subject	Location and coordinates	Date	Artist / designer	Architect / other	Type	Designation	Notes
	Skulls	Gateway (on Seething Lane) of St Olave, Hart Street 51.5107°N 0.0793°W	1658	?	?	Tympanum sculpture	Grade II*	
	Arms of Trinity House and medallions of George III and Queen Charlotte	Trinity House, Trinity Square	1793–1796	John Bacon the Elder	Samuel Wyatt	Relief	Grade I	
	Putti with nautical instruments	Trinity House (west pavilion), Trinity Square	1793–1796	John Bacon the Elder	Samuel Wyatt	Relief	Grade I	
	Putti with nautical instruments	Trinity House (east pavilion), Trinity Square	1793–1796	John Bacon the Elder	Samuel Wyatt	Relief	Grade I	
	Virgin and Child, Saint Ethelburga and Lancelot Andrewes	All Hallows-by-the-Tower, Byward Street elevation	1892–1895	Nathaniel Hitch	John Loughborough Pearson	Statues in niches	Grade I	
	Architectural sculpture	Lloyd's Register of Shipping, 71 Fenchurch Street	1899–1901	George Frampton and John Edward Taylersen	T. E. Collcutt	Reliefs, statuettes and corbels	Grade II*	Includes, in the spandrels, the arms of Dublin, Belfast, Cardiff, Southampton, Bristol, Liverpool, Manchester, Glasgow, Newcastle, the City of London and Middlesbrough.
	Mermen	60 Fenchurch Street	1906	Henry Charles Fehr?	James Glen Sivewright Gibson	Atlantes	—N/a	
	Father Thames	10 Trinity Square	1921–1922	Albert Hodge and Charles Doman	Edwin Cooper	Statue in niche	Grade II*	
	Exportation	10 Trinity Square	1921–1922	Albert Hodge and Charles Doman	Edwin Cooper	Architectural sculpture	Grade II*	
	Produce	10 Trinity Square	1921–1922	Albert Hodge and Charles Doman	Edwin Cooper	Architectural sculpture	Grade II*	
	Commerce	10 Trinity Square	1921–1922	Albert Hodge and Charles Doman	Edwin Cooper	Architectural sculpture	Grade II*	
	Navigation	10 Trinity Square	1921–1922	Albert Hodge and Charles Doman	Edwin Cooper	Architectural sculpture	Grade II*	
	Putti	Portsoken House, 84–85 The Minories	1927–1928	Philip Lindsey Clark	George Val Myer	Architectural sculpture	—N/a	
	Toc H Lamp	All Hallows-by-the-Tower, Tower Hill Terrace elevation	1945–1957	Cecil Thomas	John Seely, 2nd Baron Mottistone	Relief	Grade I	
	Judex	Goodman's Yard	1982	Keith McCarter	—N/a	Sculpture	—N/a	
More images	Bust of Samuel Pepys	Seething Lane Garden	1983	Karin Jonzen	—N/a	Bust	—N/a	
More images	Two Crutched Friars	Friary Court, Crutched Friars 51.5122°N 0.0770°W	1984–1985	Michael Black	Chapman Taylor Partners	Statues in niche	—N/a	
More images	Malta George Cross Memorial Siege of Malta	Tower Place, Byward Street, near All Hallows-by-the-Tower 51.5095°N 0.0796°W	2005	?	?	Memorial	—N/a	

== Vintry ==
Image	Title / subject	Location and coordinates	Date	Artist / designer	Architect / other	Type	Designation	Notes
	Abundance	Five Kings House, Queen Street Place, over central doorway	1911	Frank Lynn Jenkins	T. E. Collcutt and Stanley Hamp	Architectural sculpture	Grade II	
	Mercury and Agriculture(?)	Five Kings House, corner of Upper Thames Street and Queen Street Place	c. 1911–1912	G. D. Macdougald	T. E. Collcutt and Stanley Hamp	Architectural sculpture	Grade II	
	Nude Figures Restraining Pegasus	Five Kings House, Queen Street Place, pediment of the northern pavilion	c. 1911–1912	Attributed to Richard Garbe	T. E. Collcutt and Stanley Hamp	Architectural sculpture	Grade II	
	Keystone and corbel groups	Five Kings House, Queen Street Place, north doorway	c. 1911–1912	?	T. E. Collcutt and Stanley Hamp	Architectural sculpture	Grade II	
	The Fruits of Land and Water	Five Kings House, Queen Street Place, pediment of the southern pavilion	c. 1911–1912	Richard Garbe	T. E. Collcutt and Stanley Hamp	Architectural sculpture	Grade II	
	Wisdom in Commerce; Galleon	Five Kings House, Queen Street Place, southern pavilion	c. 1911–1912	Richard Garbe (spandrel relief); William Bainbridge Reynolds (galleon)	T. E. Collcutt and Stanley Hamp	Architectural sculpture	Grade II	
	Putti with Attributes	Five Kings House, Queen Street Place, south side of the southern pavilion	c. 1911–1912	Attributed to Richard Garbe	T. E. Collcutt and Stanley Hamp	Architectural sculpture	Grade II	
	Female Figure (Bacchante?) with Goats	Vintners' Place, Queen Street Place entrance	1927–1928	Herbert William Palliser	Kersey, Gale & Spooner	Relief	—N/a	
More images	Zodiacal clock	Bracken House, Cannon Street	1955–1959	Frank Dobson and Philip Bentham	Albert Richardson	Astronomical clock	Grade II*	The face of Winston Churchill appears at the centre of the clock, in place of Apollo.
More images	Swan Marker and Barge Master or The Vintners	Little Trinity Lane	2007	Vivien Mallock	—N/a	Sculptural group	—N/a	Commissioned by the Worshipful Company of Vintners, and marks their role in swan upping.

== Walbrook ==
Image	Title / subject	Location and coordinates	Date	Artist / designer	Architect / other	Type	Designation	Notes
More images	London Stone	111 Cannon Street	Uncertain; possibly Roman	—N/a	Fletcher Priest Architects (2018 setting)	Stone	Grade II*	
	The City of London Trampling Envy and Receiving the Benefits of Plenty Brought to London by the River Thames	Mansion House	1744–1745	Robert Taylor	George Dance the Elder	Pedimental sculpture	Grade I	
	Saint Anthony Abbot	Grocers' Hall, Grocers' Hall Court	1889–1893	?	?	Statue	—N/a	From the 19th-century Grocers' Hall designed by H. Cowell Boyes; incorporated into the new building of 1970.
	Courage and Integrity	NatWest, 1 Prince's Street (Prince's Street elevation)	1931	Charles Doman	Edwin Cooper	Statues in niches	Grade II	
	Security and Prosperity	NatWest, 1 Prince's Street (Mansion House Street elevation)	1931	Charles Doman	Edwin Cooper	Statues in niches	Grade II	
	Britannia with Mercury, Truth and Higher and Lower Mathematics	NatWest, 1 Prince's Street (overlooking Mansion House Corner)	1931–1932	Ernest Gillick	Edwin Cooper	Sculptural group	Grade II	
	Boy with Goose	27 Poultry	1936–1937	William Reid Dick	Edwin Lutyens	Architectural sculpture	Grade I	Two sculptural groups on the corners of the building, each a mirror-image of the other. Thought to derive from the Hellenistic sculptor Boethus's composition of a boy strangling a goose.
	The Arts	St Swithin's House, Walbrook	1951	Siegfried Charoux	R. W. Symonds	Architectural sculpture	—N/a	A group of five monumental male nudes.
	Manual Labour	St Swithin's House, Walbrook	1951	Siegfried Charoux	R. W. Symonds	Architectural sculpture	—N/a	Figures of a fisherman, a blacksmith, a miner and a shepherd.
	Thistles, Lion, Eagle with Thistles, Crowned Helmet	36–39 Poultry	1969–1970	Mitzi Cunliffe	Joseph, F. Milton Cashmore and Partners	Reliefs	—N/a	
	City Dragons	Bank tube station	1994	Gerald Laing	—N/a	Reliefs	—N/a	
	Line drawings of buildings at Bank junction	Bank tube station	1995	Doug Patterson	—N/a	Enamel panels	—N/a	
More images	Memorial to Catrin ferch Owain Glyndŵr and to the suffering of all women and children in war	St Swithin's Church Garden	2001	Richard Renshaw	Nic Stradlyn-John	Sculpture	—N/a	Unveiled 16 September 2001 by Siân Phillips. The garden was re-landscaped in 2010.

=== Bank of England ===
Image	Title / subject	Location and coordinates	Date	Artist / designer	Architect / other	Type	Designation	Notes
	Doors	Threadneedle Street façade	1928–1931	Charles Wheeler	John Soane	Reliefs	Grade I	
	Telamones and caryatides	Threadneedle Street façade, beneath the portico	1928–1931	Charles Wheeler	Herbert Baker	High-relief figures	Grade I	
	Keystone	Threadneedle Street façade	1928–1931	Charles Wheeler	Herbert Baker	Relief	Grade I	
	The Lady of the Bank	Threadneedle Street façade	1929–1930	Charles Wheeler	Herbert Baker	Pedimental sculpture	Grade I	
	Statue of John Soane	Lothbury façade 51.5144°N 0.0892°W	1930–1937	William Reid Dick	Herbert Baker	High-relief statue in niche	Grade I	
	The Lothbury Ladies	Lothbury façade	1932–1937	Charles Wheeler	Herbert Baker	Architectural sculpture	Grade I	
	Goods Yard Doors	Lothbury façade	1934–1938	Charles Wheeler	Herbert Baker	Reliefs	Grade I	
	Lothbury Court Doors, or Bullion Doors	Lothbury façade	1934–1938	Charles Wheeler	Herbert Baker	Reliefs	Grade I	
	Door	Princes Street façade	1935	Charles Wheeler	Herbert Baker	Reliefs	Grade I	
	Ariel or The Spirit of the Winds	Tivoli Corner 51.5146°N 0.0880°W	1935–1937	Charles Wheeler	Herbert Baker	Architectural sculpture	Grade I	
	Keystones	Tivoli Corner	1935–1937	Charles Wheeler	Herbert Baker	Architectural sculpture	Grade I	

== See also ==
- Equestrian statue of Charles II trampling Cromwell, formerly at the Stocks Market (on the site now occupied by the Mansion House)
- Statue of John Cass, formerly on Aldgate High Street and then Jewry Street

== Bibliography ==
- Baker, Margaret (1995). London Statues and Monuments. Princes Risborough: Shire Publications.
- Darke, Johanna, ed. (2000). A User's Guide to Public Sculpture. Swindon: English Heritage.
- Matthews, Peter (2018). London's Statues and Monuments. Oxford: Shire Publications.
- Pearson, Lynn (2006). Public Art Since 1950. Princes Risborough: Shire Publications.
- Ward-Jackson, Philip (2003). Public Sculpture of the City of London. Public Sculpture of Britain. Vol. 7. Liverpool: Liverpool University Press.
