= The Young Lovers (sculpture) =

Sculpture by Georg Ehrlich

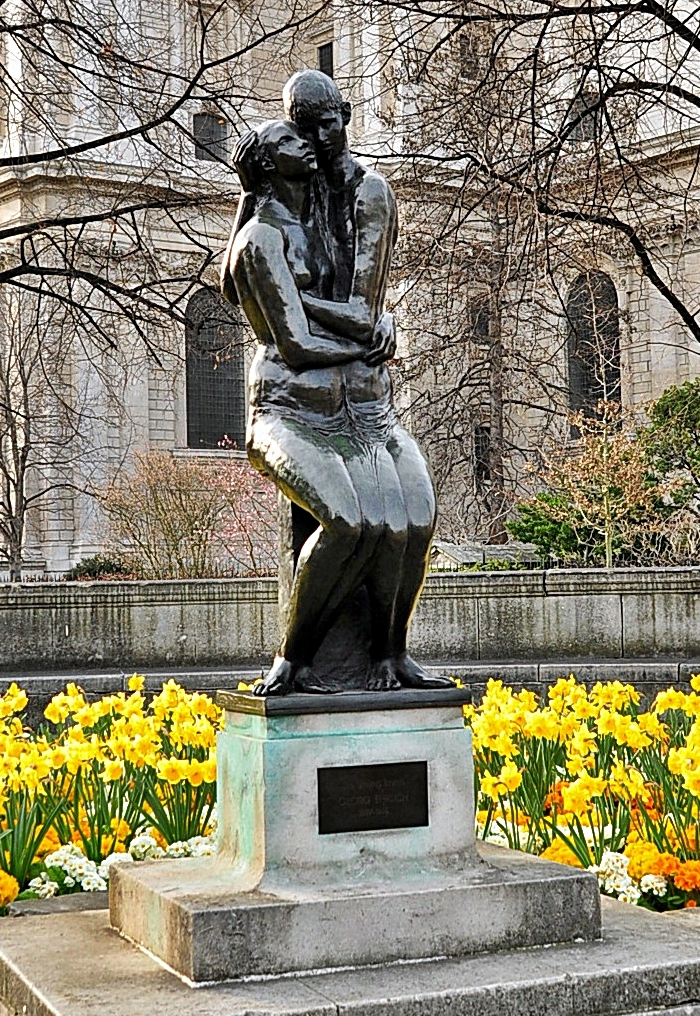
- The sculpture in 2010
- Artist: Georg Ehrlich
- Type: Sculpture
- Location: London, United Kingdom; 51.513262°N 0.09715°W

The Young Lovers is an outdoor sculpture by Georg Ehrlich, installed at Festival Gardens in London, United Kingdom. It was installed in the garden in 1973.

== See also ==
- List of public art in the City of London
