= Statue of John Wesley, St Paul's Churchyard =

Statue in St Paul's Churchyard, London

Statue of John Wesley
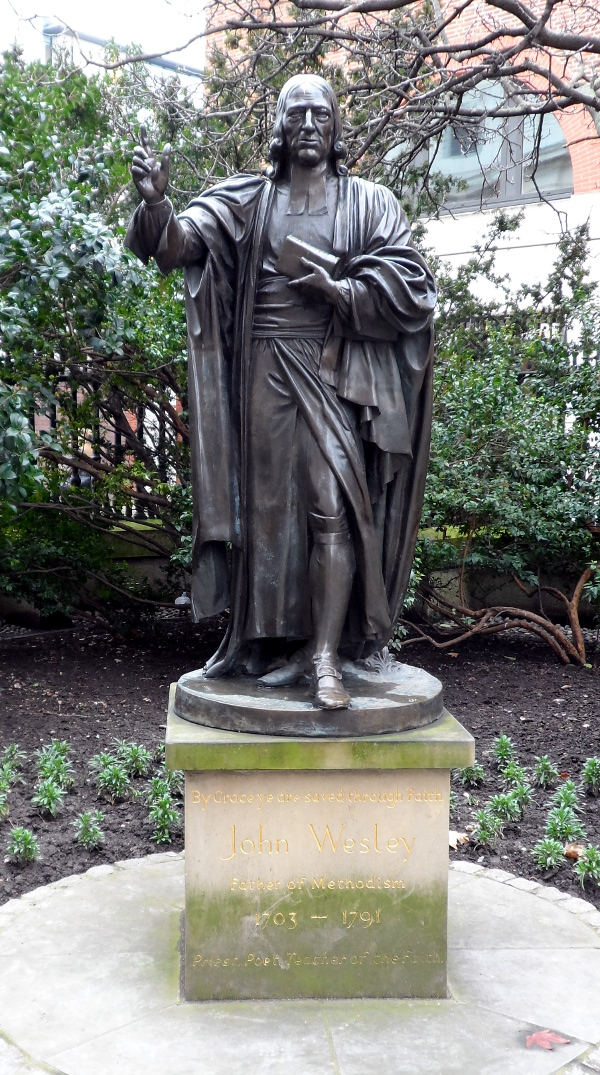
- The statue in 2013
- Artist: Samuel Manning (sculptor)
- Year: 1988
- Medium: Bronze
- Subject: John Wesley
- Dimensions: 1.6 m (5.1 ft)
- Location: St Paul's Churchyard, London; 51.51430°N 0.09854°W

The statue of John Wesley, St Paul's Churchyard is an outdoor bronze sculpture depicting the theologian, cleric and co-founder of the religious movement known as Methodism, John Wesley. The statue is located northwest corner of St Paul's Churchyard, London, England, and was erected in 1988. It was cast from a sculpture created by Samuel Manning and his son between 1825 and 1849.

From 24 to 26 May 1738, Wesley worshipped in the nearby chancel of St Paul's Cathedral. The statue is 5 foot 1 inches high, Wesley's height in life, and shows him wearing a cassock and holding a Bible in his left hand. An inscription on the front of the plinth reads:

By Grace ye are saved through Faith John Wesley, Father of Methodism, 1703–1791, priest, poet, teacher of the Faith.

On the rear of the plinth is a plaque reading "Property of Aldersgate Trustees of the Methodist Church – 17 September 1988".

Samuel Manning's original sculpture was in plaster and was exhibited at the Royal Academy in 1825. After Manning the Elder's death, his son recreated the sculpture in marble, and it is now situated in the Methodist Central Hall, Westminster.

== See also ==
- List of public art in the City of London § St Paul's Churchyard
- Statue of John Wesley, Shoreditch
