= Holborn Circus =

Junction of five highways in the City of London

Coordinates: 51.5176°N 0.1075°W

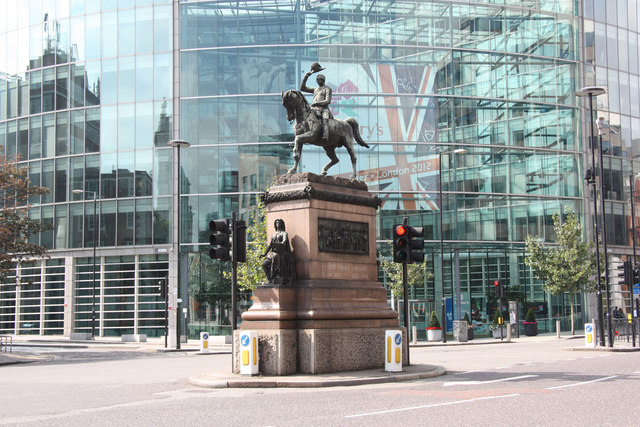
- Holborn Circus pictured in 2012

Location
- London, United Kingdom
- Roads at junction: High Holborn (eastern part also named Holborn Viaduct); Hatton Garden, Charterhouse Street, New Fetter Lane,

Construction
- Type: Intersection
- Opened: 1867; 158 years ago

Holborn Circus is a five-way junction at the western extreme of the City of London, specifically between Holborn (St Andrew) and its Hatton Garden (St Alban) part. Its main, east–west, route is the inchoate A40 road. It was designed by the engineer William Haywood and opened in 1867. The term circus describes how the frontages of the buildings facing curved round in a concave chamfer. These, in part replaced with glass and metal-clad buildings, remain well set back.

The place was described in Charles Dickens' Dictionary of London (1879) as "perhaps... the finest piece of street architecture in the City".

== Roads ==
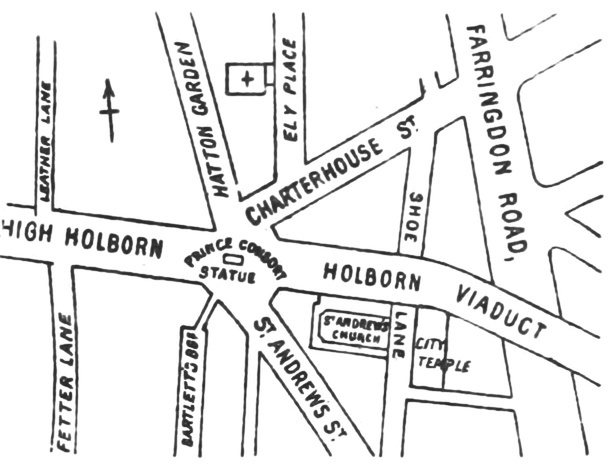
Roads meeting at Holborn Circus (1888 sketch plan)

High Holborn (part of the A40 road) links Holborn Circus to the West End. To the east, Holborn Viaduct leads into the City of London financial district. To the north Charterhouse Street and London's jewellery trade district of Hatton Garden is in the London Borough of Camden. The district of Clerkenwell is to the north-east. New Fetter Lane (the start of the A4 road) exits to the south, a few metres along which a brief lane, without motor vehicle access at its south end, leads towards Blackfriars, which changes name twice along its course.

=== Layout changes ===
Holborn Circus was a frequent accident blackspot, topping a list of the worst such sites in 2012. This was partly due to it being a multi-arm junction, that was a signalised roundabout, and had poor visibility due to the central statue.

The Clear Zone Partnership between the London Borough of Camden and the City of London identified the need to simplify and improve this junction in road safety terms. The City of London identified the opportunity to redirect St Andrew's Street into New Fetter Lane. To create a new paved space beside the church and to reduce the number of arms of the junction. Despite this traffic modelling still could not make the traffic flow adequately work for this new junction design. The London Borough of Camden then saw that by relocating the statue to beside the junction it could be seen and appreciated up close by people, and this would allow a smaller, and potentially safer junction, which became the successful design.

In May 2012 funding was secured for a £4.4 million improvement project to the junction to reduce its high accident rate. Works included the relocation of the statue from the centre of the junction where it obstructed drivers' sight lines to a nearby position on High Holborn. The number of roads feeding into the junction was also reduced from six to five, with St Andrew Street now accessed from New Fetter Lane.

== Surrounding buildings ==
On one side lies the church of St Andrew, Holborn, an ancient guild church that survived the Great Fire of London. However, the parochial authority decided to commission Christopher Wren to rebuild it. Although the nave was destroyed in the Blitz, the reconstruction was faithful to Wren's original. Many other buildings surrounding Holborn Circus were severely damaged during the Blitz. After the Second World War, many were demolished.

From 1961 to 1994 the modernist headquarters of the Daily Mirror, designed by Sir Owen Williams and Anderson, Forster and Wilcox, were a prominent landmark overlooking the junction. The site is now occupied by the headquarters of the supermarket Sainsbury's.

== Prince Albert statue ==
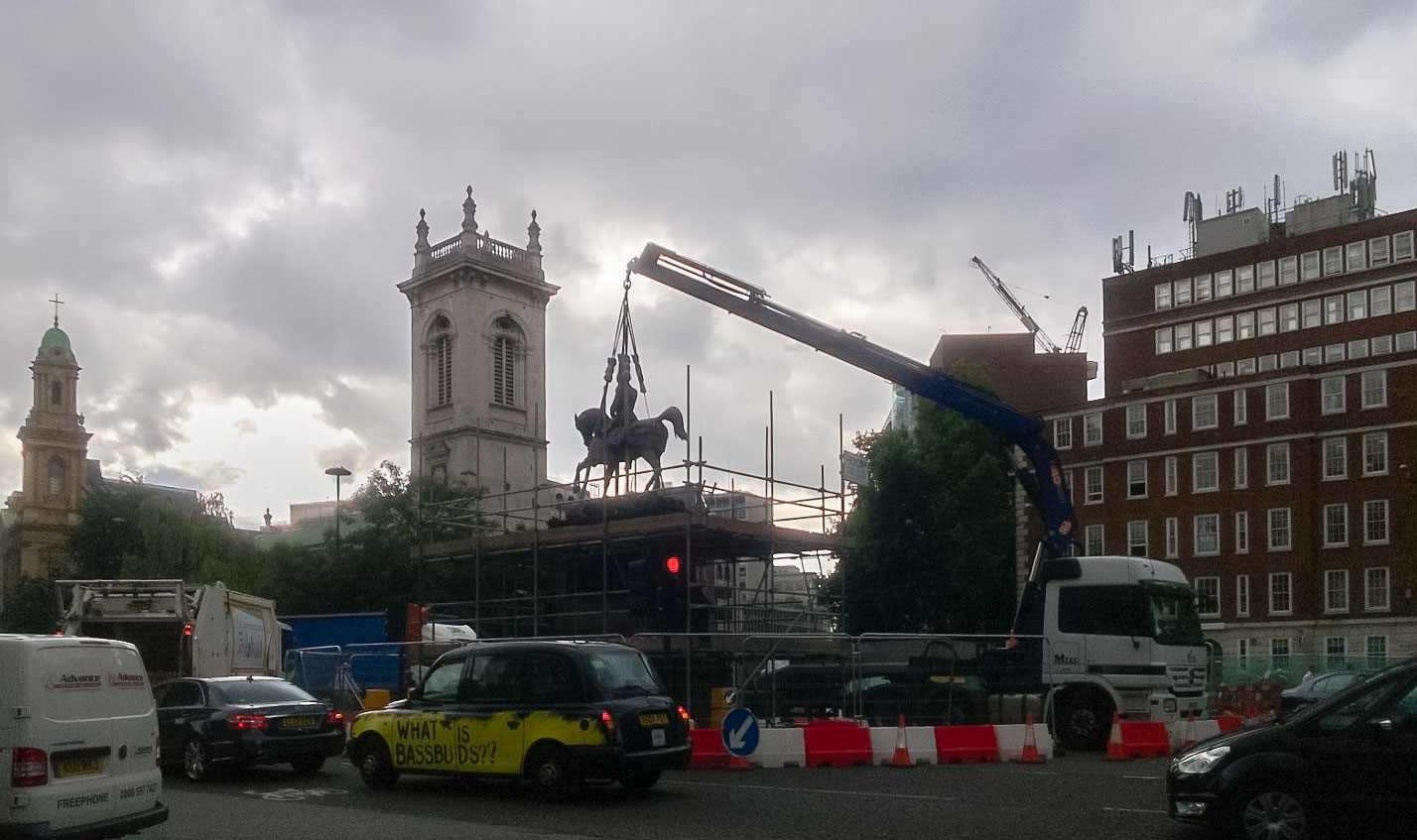
Statue of Prince Albert being removed for renovation July 2013

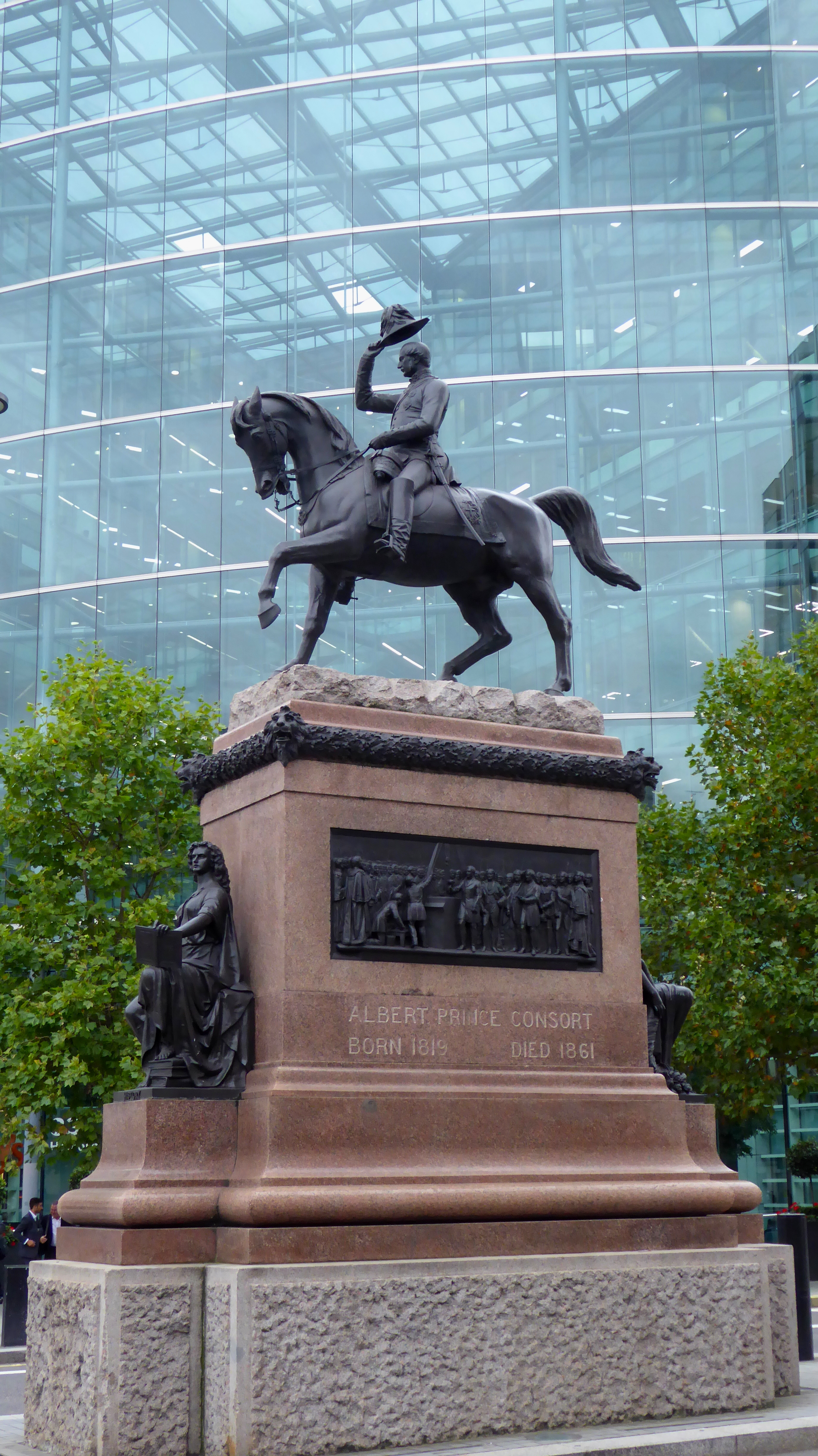
Prince Albert statue

To the west of Holborn Circus there is an equestrian statue of Prince Albert by Charles Bacon (1874) which is the City of London's official monument to him. This bronze statue was originally sited in the middle of the circus and was moved in 2014 as part of improvement works to the junction.

The statue features the prince consort in a field marshal's uniform raising his hat. The sculpture sits on an oblong plinth displaying plaques of Britannia, Albert and bronze figures representing commerce and peace.

It was presented by Charles Oppenheim, of the diamond trading company De Beers, whose headquarters is on nearby Charterhouse Street.

== See also ==
- Ely Place
