= Statue of Thomas Becket, London =

Sculpture by Edward Bainbridge Copnall

Statue of Thomas Becket
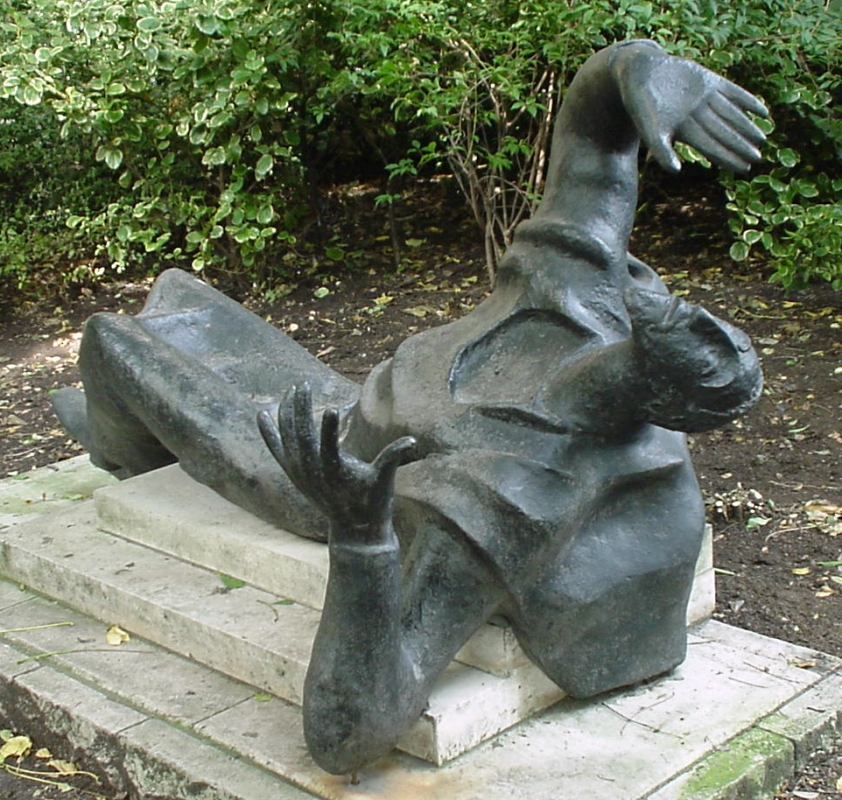
- The statue in 2004
- Artist: Edward Bainbridge Copnall
- Subject: Thomas Becket
- Location: London, United Kingdom; 51.5135°N 0.0976°W

Listed Building – Grade II
- Official name: St Thomas à Becket sculpture
- Designated: 19 January 2016
- Reference no.: 1431353

The statue of Thomas Becket (1970) by Edward Bainbridge Copnall is installed in St Paul's Churchyard in London, United Kingdom.

It was designated a Grade II Listed building in January 2016.

== See also ==
- 1970 in art
- List of public art in the City of London
