= Icarus (sculpture) =

1973 sculpture by Michael Ayrton

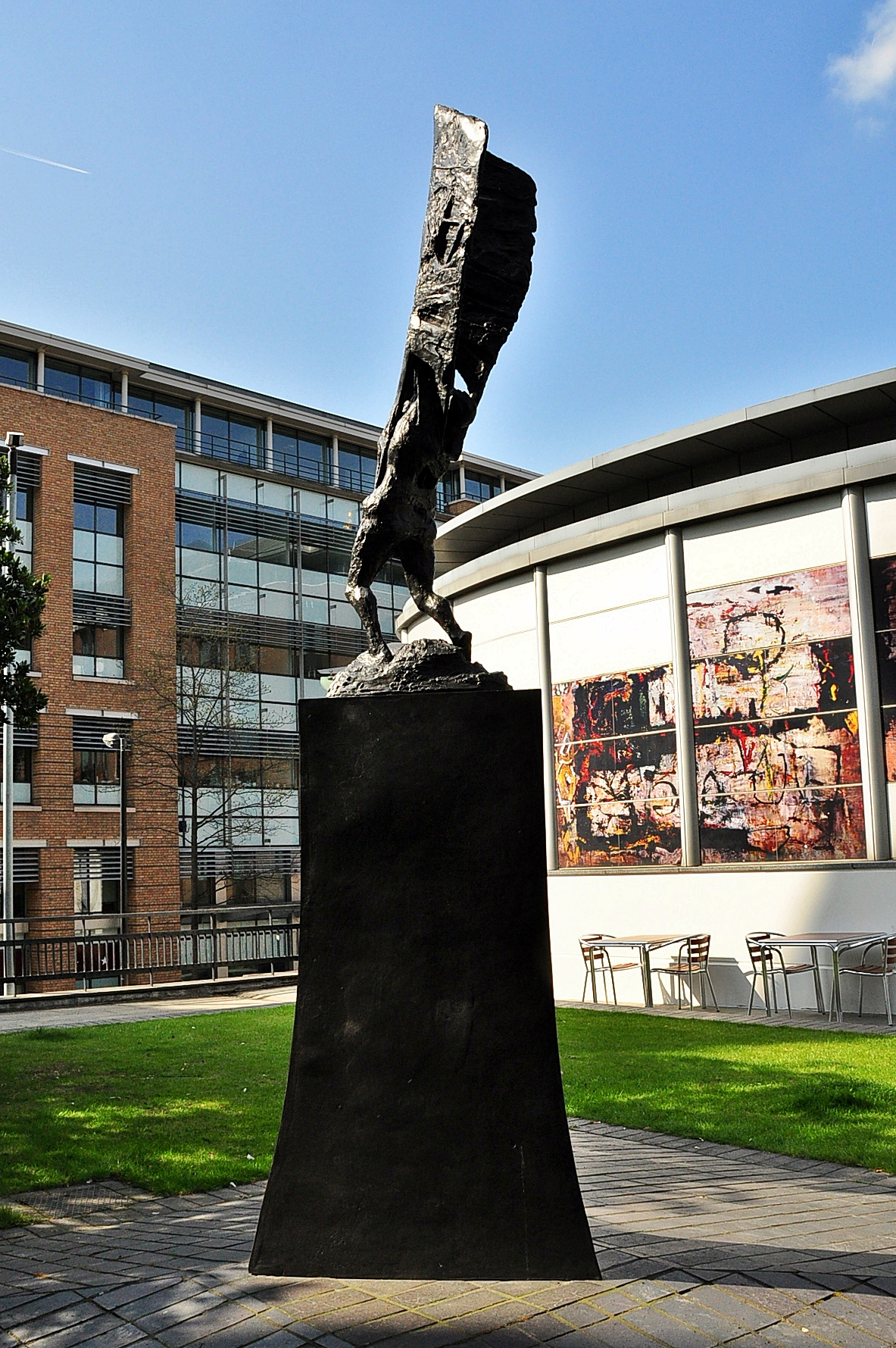
- The sculpture in 2012
- Artist: Michael Ayrton
- Year: 1973
- Type: Sculpture
- Subject: Icarus
- Location: London, United Kingdom; 51.512594°N 0.097294°W

Icarus, also known as Icarus III, is an outdoor 1973 sculpture depicting the Greek mythological figure of the same name by Michael Ayrton, installed in Old Change Court in the City of London, in the United Kingdom.

== Other sculptures ==
The first edition of this sculpture is owned by the Royal Air Force Museum. They bought it from the Bruton Gallery in 1973.

== See also ==
- 1973 in art
- Greek mythology in western art and literature
- List of public art in the City of London
