= The Gold Smelters =

Sculpture in London

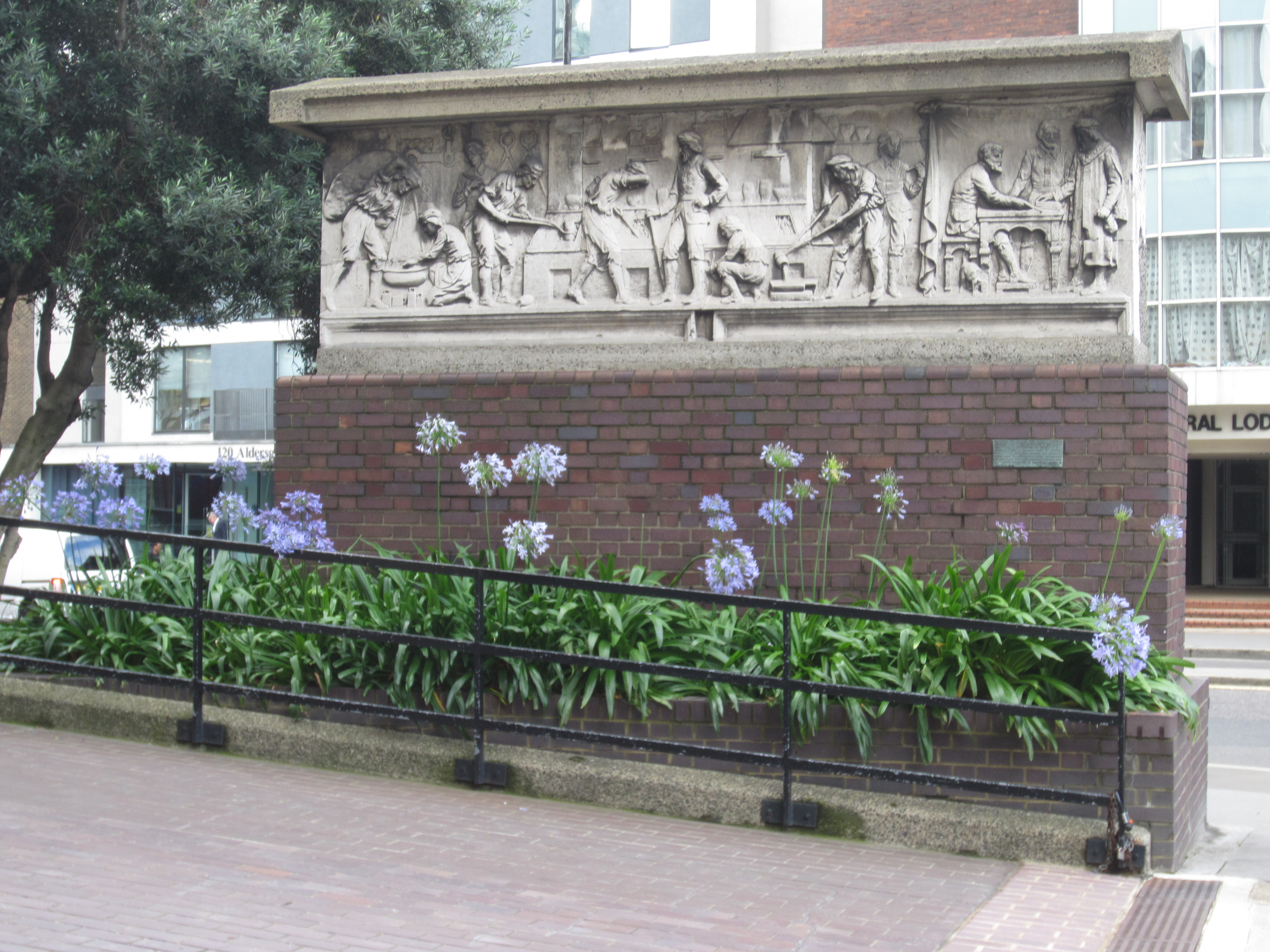
- The relief in 2014
- Artist: J. Daymond
- Location: London, United Kingdom; 51.521394°N 0.097184°W

The Gold Smelters, also known as the Barbican Frieze, Bryer's Frieze, Gold Refiners, or abridged as Gold Smelters, is an outdoor frieze relief by J. Daymond, installed along Aldersgate Street in London, United Kingdom. It was saved from a building demolished in the 1960s and re-erected in its present location by the Corporation of London in 1975.

== Description ==
The medium relief depicts twelve figures engaged in gold refining trade, plus a cat. The relief is part of a large concrete block mounted on a brick plinth. A nearby plaque reads, THIS FRIEZE WAS REMOVED FROM NUMBER 53 AND 54 / BARBICAN WHEN IT WAS DEMOLISHED IN 1962 AND RE / ERECTED BY THE CORPORATION OF LONDON IN 1975 / NUMBER 53 AND 54 WERE THE PREMISES / OF W. BRYER & SONS GOLD REFINERS AND ASSAYERS / WHOSE TRADE IS DEPICTED IN THE FRIEZE. THE BUILDING / WAS ONE OF THE FEW WHICH SURVIVED WHEN THE AREA / WAS LARGELY DESTROYED BY INCENDIARY BOMBS IN / DECEMBER 1940.
