= William Silver Frith =

British artist

William Silver Frith (1850–1924) was a British sculptor.

Frith graduated from the Lambeth School of Art and the Royal Academy Schools, and became assistant to Jules Dalou. By 1880 Frith had succeeded Dalou as master at the Lambeth School of Art, at a time when it was being reorganised into the South London Technical Art School (now called City and Guilds of London Art School). There he became a guiding force to several of the figures in the New Sculpture school, including F. W. Pomeroy, C. J. Allen, and George Frampton.

In his own work he was primarily an architectural sculptor, often with architect Sir Aston Webb.

His work includes:

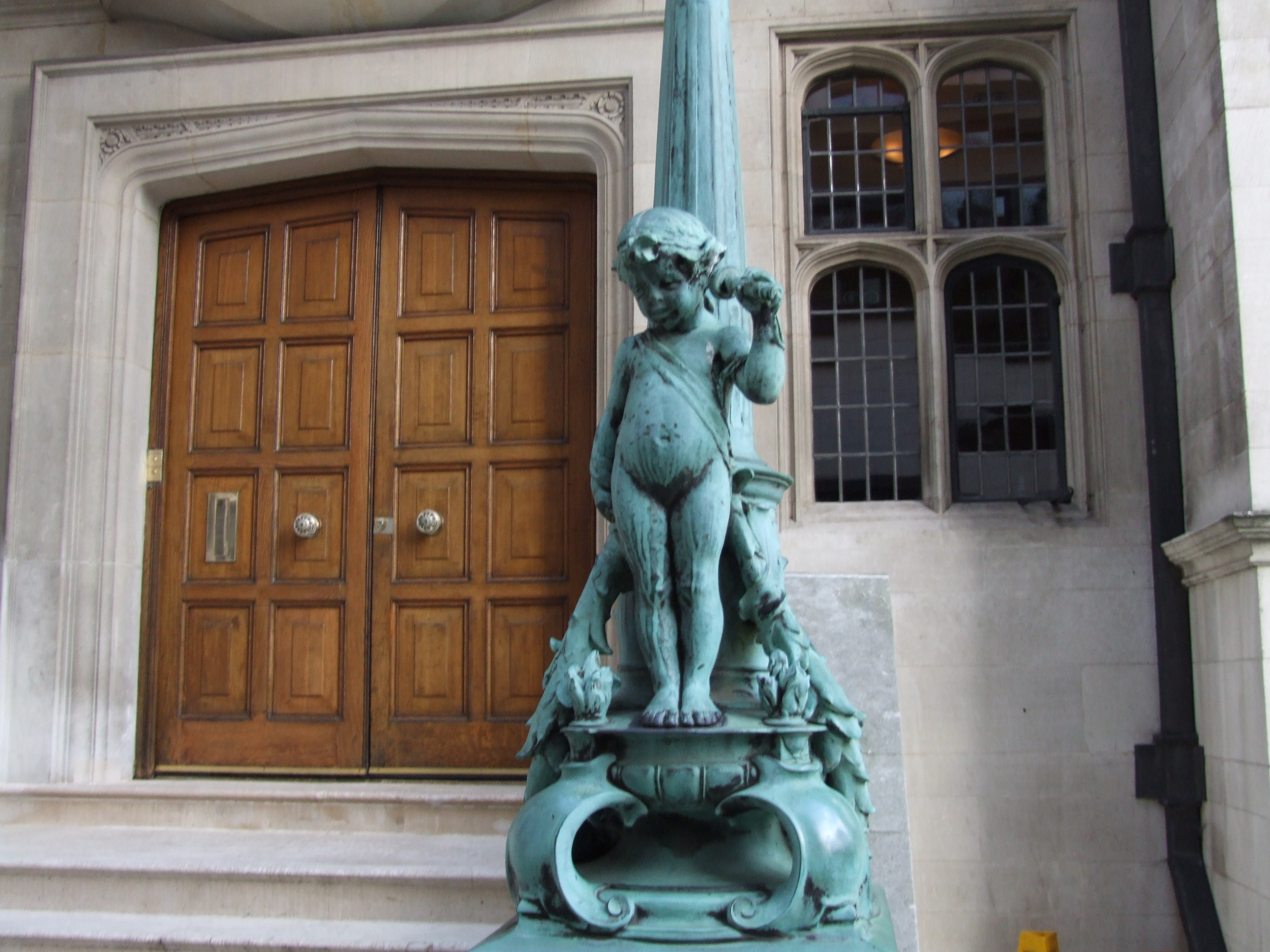
One of the pair of ornamental lamppost-sculptures at the portico front entrance of Two Temple Place, designed by Frith.

- figures of Justice, Truth, Patience and Plenty, Victoria Law Courts, Birmingham (1885)
- the Metropolitan Life Assurance Company building in Moorgate, London
- fountain figures at Christ's Hospital, Horsham, West Sussex, England
- Imperial College, South Kensington
- supervising sculptor and the Canada group for The Doulton Fountain, Glasgow (1887–1888)
- statues of British sculptors Grinling Gibbons and John Bacon for the Victoria and Albert Museum (1899–1909)
- front entrance portico design and sculptures (as well as assorted other elements of the building decoration) for Two Temple Place, London, England
- the Hugh de Boves and Hugh of Faringdon memorials, in the ruined chapter house of Reading Abbey (1911)
