= Michael Black (sculptor) =

British sculptor (1928–2019)

Michael Black (1928 – 14 February 2019) was a British sculptor who lived and worked in Oxford. He is best known for carving the Emperors' Heads outside the Sheldonian Theatre in Oxford.

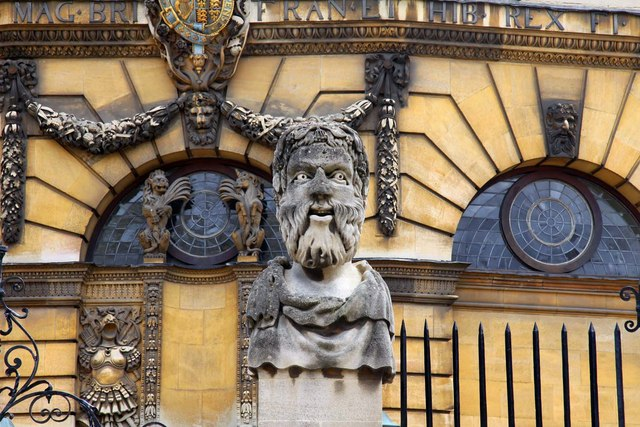
One of Black's carved heads outside the Sheldonian Theatre

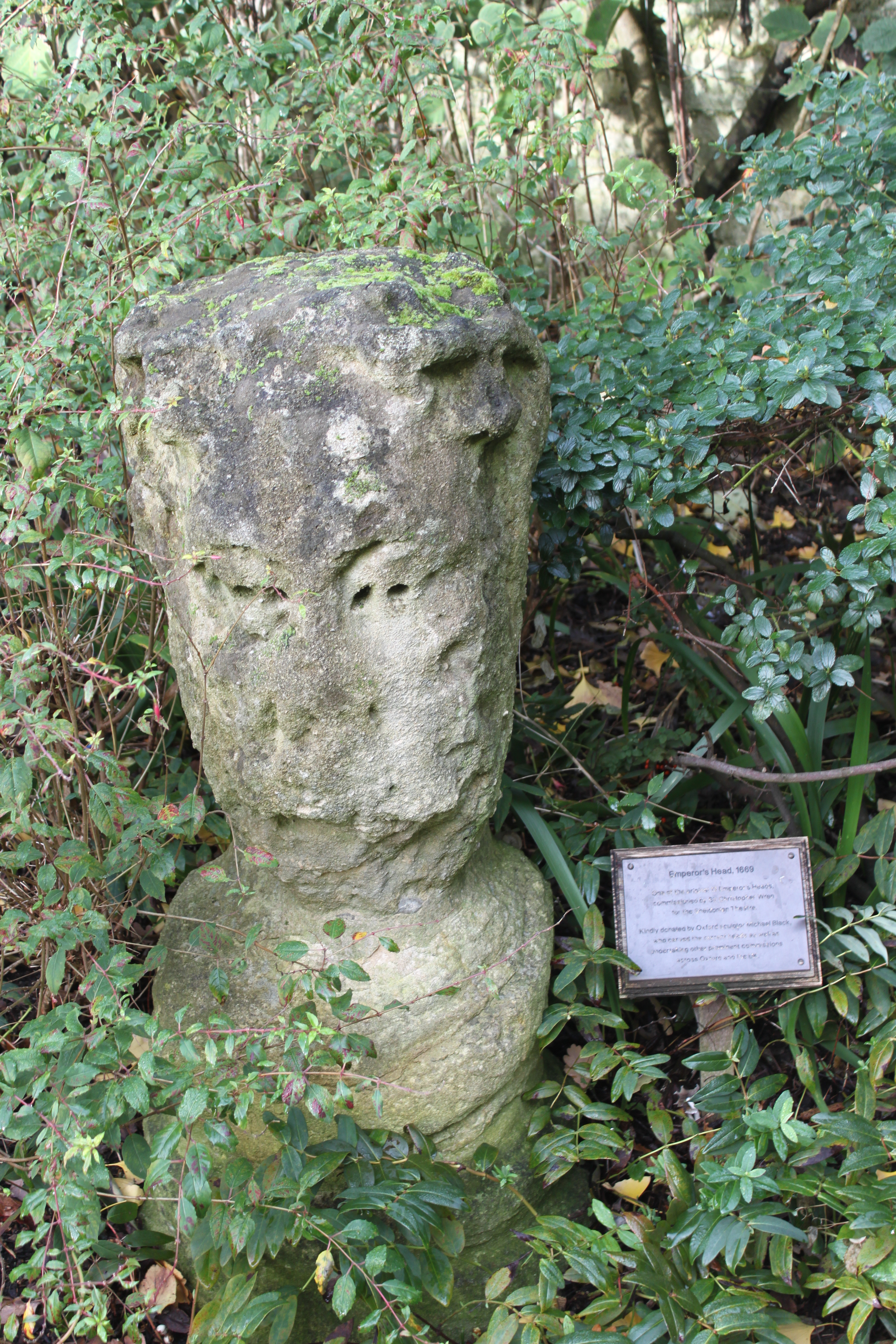
Old head donated by Black's family to Wadham College

== Biography ==
Michael Black was born in Portsmouth in 1928. His father was a vicar. After National Service with the Royal Army Veterinary Corps, Black moved to Oxford and studied at St Catherine's College, a constituent college of the University of Oxford.

Whilst a student, Black began working as a sculptor's assistant to E.S. Frith at the Windrush Studio, Burford. Black was also involved in restoration work at Wadham College, where he worked with Frith to recarve elements of the college's façade, before securing his own commissions.

In 1958, Black carved the headstone of artist and author Robert Gibbings.

Between 1960 and 1970, Black developed his studio fine art practice and exhibited with Richard Demarco in Edinburgh (1968). He exhibited at various London galleries including a joint show with painter Douglas Portway at The Marjorie Parr Gallery (1970) and in ‘Manufactured Art’, Camden Art Centre (1970).

In 1970, Black was commissioned to create 17 replacements for the Emperor's Heads outside the Sheldonian Theatre in Oxford. The original heads had been carved in Clipsham stone by William Byrd between 1664 and 1669, before being replaced in 1868. The newer statues eroded faster than the older statues and thus needed to be replaced sooner. Black carved the replacement statues in his studio at Folly Bridge and then at Medley Manor Farm, Binsey, Oxford. The statues were replaced by Black's new heads in 1972. The family later donated one of the original 17th-century heads to Wadham College; it is located in the college gardens.

In 1971, Black made a death mask of Sir Maurice Bowra, Warden of Wadham College, Oxford, from which a plaster cast is now held in the National Portrait Gallery, London.

In 1974, Black designed and installed a new spiral staircase for the Science Museum, London.

In 1975, he collaborated with Theo Bergstrom on The Thames, A Picture Book, documenting their journey by rowing a boat from source to sea.

In 1976, Black was commissioned to carve the Memorial to Paul Julius Reuter to mark 125 years of the global news organisation, situated in the Royal Exchange Buildings, London.

In 1978, Black made a death mask of the poet Sylvia Townsend Warner, and carved the new replacement angels for the south porch of University Church of St Mary the Virgin in Oxford.

In 1983, Black was commissioned to carve the marble bust of Sir Alec Douglas-Home for the House of Lords, London which is in the Parliamentary Art Collection.

In 1984, Black carved the Crutched Friars, for the Commercial Union Insurance Office in London.

In 1985, he sculpted a bronze and marble bust of Sir Sacheverell Sitwell. The bronze is in the National Portrait Gallery.

In 1986, he carved a bronze bust of conductor Sir Reginald Goodall.

And in 1990, Black carved a bronze bust of Sir Harold Macmillan, 1st Earl of Stockton and former UK Prime Minister.

Starting in the mid-1980s, Black organized an alternative May Morning celebration in Oxford. The event was held on Aristotle Bridge in North Oxford and featured performances by the Eynsham Morris Men and the Headington Quarry Morris Men. Notably, the Headington Quarry Morris Men had previously danced with the new Emperor's Heads on the day they were installed in Oxford in 1972.

== Personal life and death ==
Michael Black was married to the Oxford painter Jacqueline Black (1933–2000). He had five children, four of which were with Jacqueline. Black died in his home in Oxford on 14 February 2019, aged 90.

In 2021, the Black family donated works and ephemera to Oxfordshire Museum Service and the Oxfordshire County Records Office/History Centre, Cowley, Oxford.

== Sources ==
- Garnett, Jane; Davies, C. S. L. (1994). Wadham College. Oxford: Wadham College.
- Pevsner, Nikolaus; Sherwood, Jennifer (1975). Oxfordshire (3rd ed.). Penguin. ISBN 0140710450.
