= 10 Trinity Square =

Building in the City of London

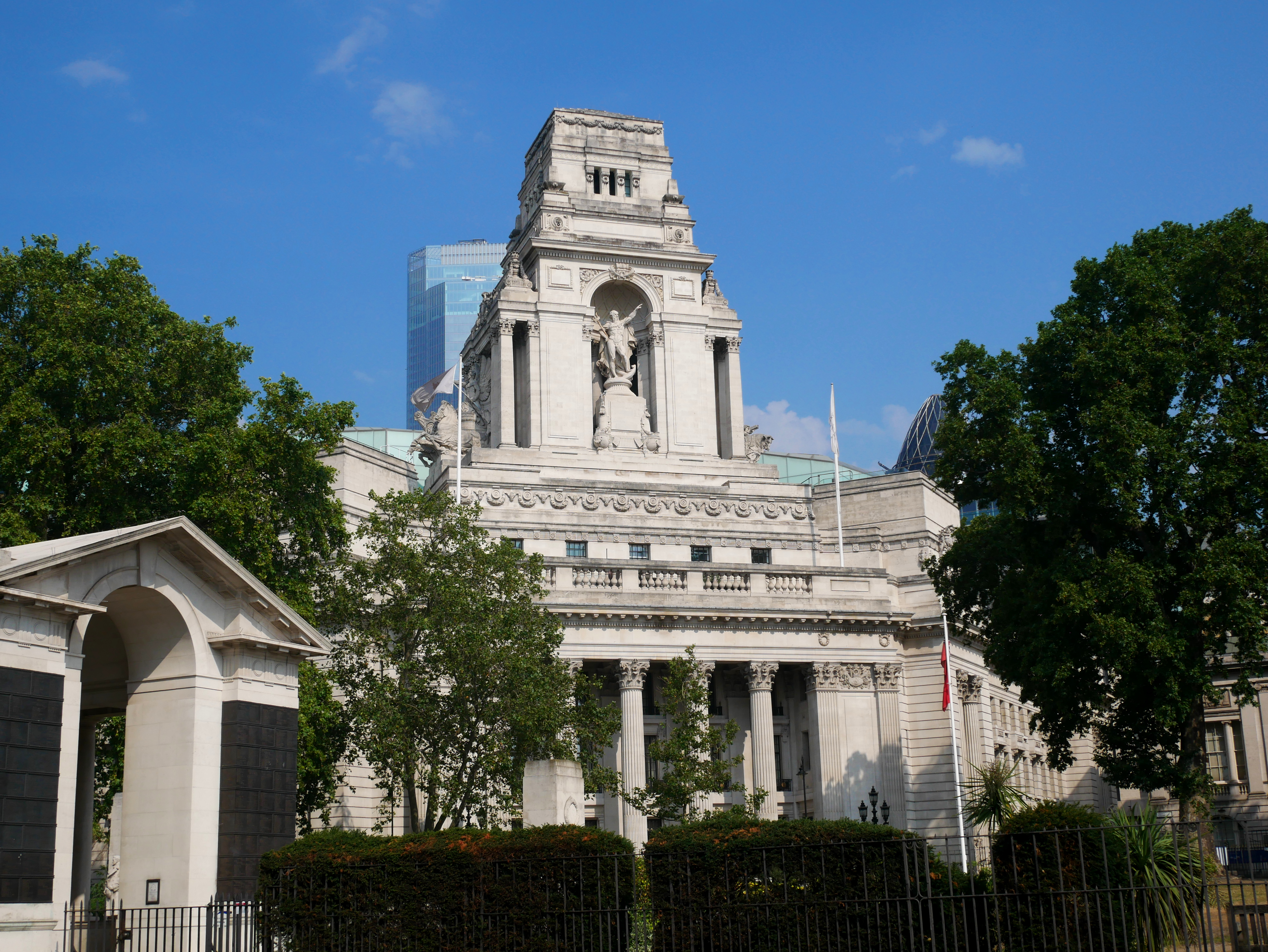
- 10 Trinity Square

- Location within Central London
- Alternative names: (Former) Port of London Authority Building

General information
- Type: Commercial
- Architectural style: Beaux Arts
- Location: 10 Trinity Square, London, EC3, England, United Kingdom
- Coordinates: 51°30′36″N 0°04′41″W
- Current tenants: Four Seasons Hotels and Resorts
- Opened: 1922
- Client: Port of London Authority
- Owner: Reignwood

Design and construction
- Architect: Edwin Cooper
- Main contractor: John Mowlem & Co
- Designations: Grade II* listed building

Website
- www.fourseasons.com/tentrinity/

10 Trinity Square is a Grade II* listed building in London, United Kingdom, overlooking the River Thames at Tower Hill, in the southeastern corner of the City of London. Built in the Beaux Arts style, it is best known as the former headquarters of the Port of London Authority and is thus also sometimes referred to as the Port of London Authority Building.

Since 2017, it has been operating as the Four Seasons Hotel London at Ten Trinity Square.

== Location ==
As the name implies, the building is located at 10 Trinity Square, close to the River Thames, Tower Bridge, and the Tower of London, in the southeast of the City of London. It occupies the northwestern corner of Trinity Square and faces Trinity Square Gardens.

== History ==
The Beaux-Arts structure was designed by Sir Edwin Cooper and built by John Mowlem & Co in 1912–22 as the new headquarters of the Port of London Authority. Compulsory purchase of the site was authorised by the Port of London Act 1911 (1 & 2 Geo. 5. c. xxvii). It was opened by David Lloyd George, then the British Prime Minister, in 1922, in the presence of the architect and Lord Devonport, the Authority's first chairman. At the time, it was one of the city's tallest buildings.

During its heyday, the building was frequented by hundreds of people each day who were paying their dues on goods landed in the port. Under a large dome supported by marble columns, the central rotunda of the building housed walnut and brass counters radiating out from a central clock.

The building was badly damaged by German bombing during the Blitz in World War II; the domed rotunda was destroyed. When renovated in the 1970s, a functional rectangular office block was built to occupy the central part of the building which had been destroyed in the war, changing the effect of the originally 40 m wide courtyard in the building's centre.

It was occupied as the global headquarters of insurance broker Willis Faber Limited following the relocation of the PLA to Smithfield. Willis is now based in the Willis Building in nearby Lime Street.

The PLA is now based elsewhere in the City of London and at Gravesend.

In 2006, 10 Trinity Square was acquired by Thomas Enterprises Inc. It was sold to a partnership of KOP Group and Reignwood in 2010. KOP lost their stake to Reignwood in 2012. It was redeveloped into a 100-room hotel with 41 private residences and a private members' club under the Four Seasons Hotels and Resorts brand known as "Four Seasons Hotel London at Ten Trinity Square". The hotel opened in 2017.

As part of the renovation, archaeologists were consulted who excavated the rotunda and a public garden in Seething Lane. The site of 10 Trinity Square was previously occupied by a 17th-century building by Christopher Wren. It housed the Navy Board, the administration of the Royal Navy, and Samuel Pepys had an office there. In the 18th century, part of the site was occupied by a warehouse of the East India Company. The lowest strata revealed shards and ornaments from the time of Roman London.

The building's exterior has been featured in many films and television shows, including The Professionals, Kavanagh QC, The Crown (TV series), and the 2012 James Bond film, Skyfall.

== Description ==
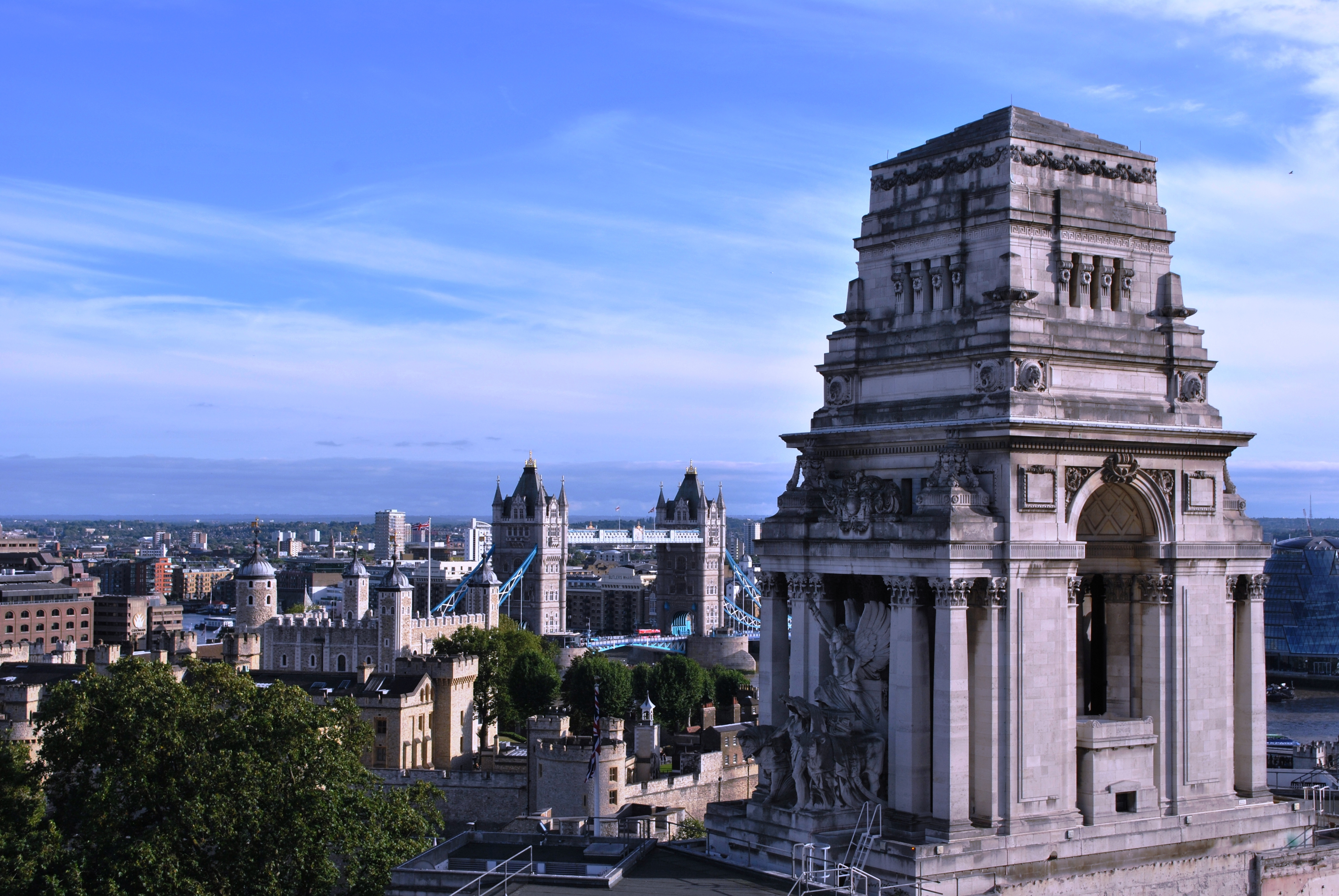
10 Trinity Square in 2012

The façade features Corinthian columns and a large allegorical statue of Father Thames.

There is a new rotunda at the centre of the hotel, but it has a much smaller dome than the original. The inner courtyard is also much smaller, reduced in area by a "glass box" building that provides space for the hotel rooms. The old board room of the Port of London Authority with its walnut paneling and rich carvings, which in 1946 hosted the reception for the first meeting of the United Nations, has been restored. The staircases feature ironwork with the Port Authority logo.

Historic England describes the building as follows: "Large, detached, monumental building of Portland stone. Nearly square plan with entrance at canted south east corner. Plain courtyard formerly filled by large rotunda destroyed in World War II. four storeys plus basement and slated mansard treated as stone attic to end pavilions and at entrance. Deep entablature with pairs of Corinthian columns in antis to pavilions. four columned entrance portico, also in antis, the entablature topped by balustrade in front of attic. Above rises broad tower embellished with order of Corinthian pilasters and piers, arched niche and colossal figure sculpture. Stepped upper part. Entrance hall, corridors etc of some distinction. Suite of richly paneled rooms on second floor, notably dining room, chairman's room and board room, east 2 with exceptional carved decoration."
