= Robert Hargreaves Rogers =

Former Sheriff of London

Sir Robert Hargreaves Rogers (20 January 1850 – 30 November 1924) was Sheriff of the City of London. He was knighted in 1897.

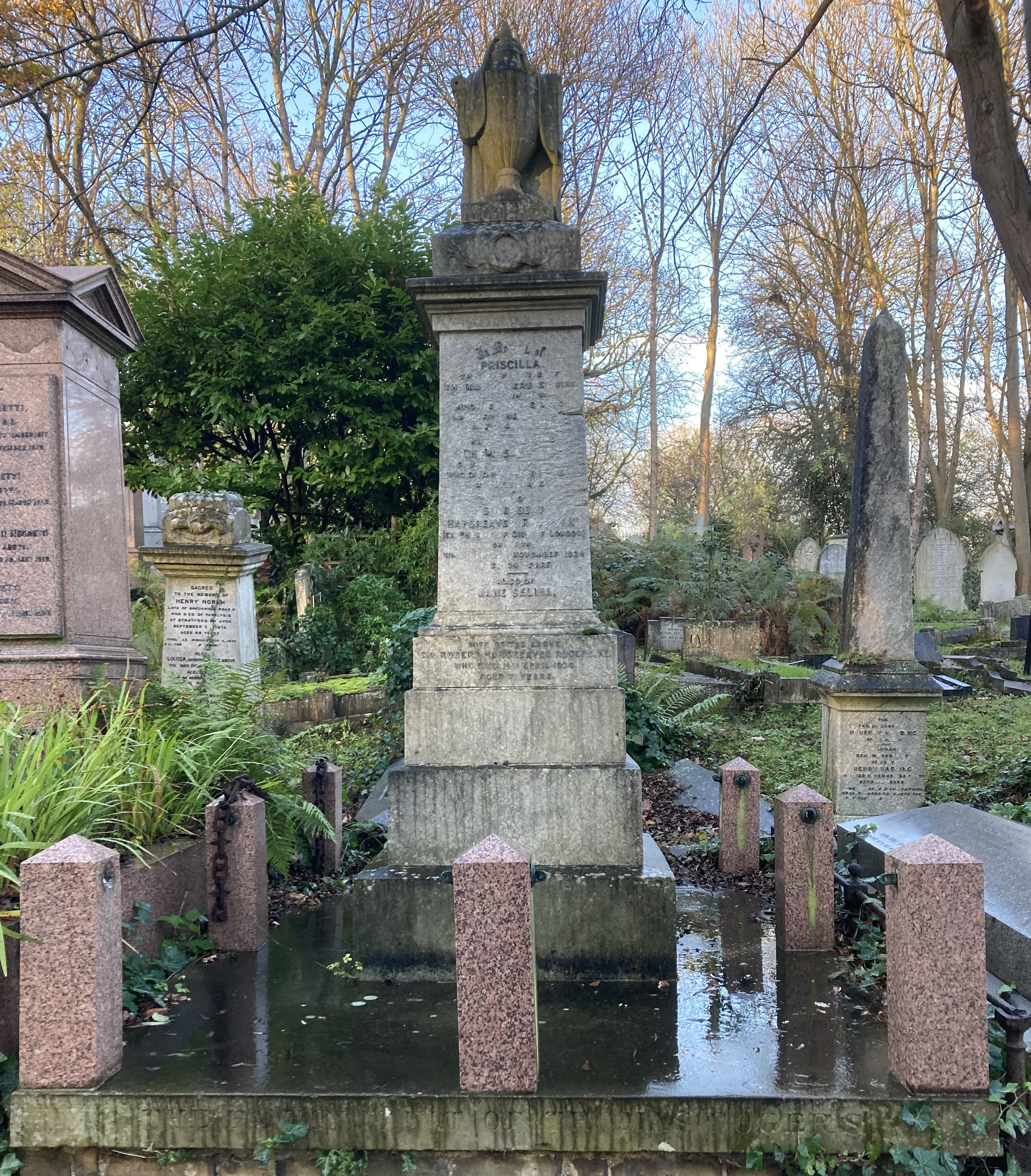
Grave of Sir Robert Hargreaves Rogers in Highgate Cemetery
