= Edwin Cooper (architect) =

English architect

Sir Edwin Cooper RA FRIBA
- Born: 21 October 1874; Scarborough, North Yorkshire
- Died: 24 July 1942 (aged 67); London
- Occupation: Architect
- Spouse: Mary Emily Welburn
- Awards: Royal Gold Medal
- Practice: Russell & Cooper (c. 1900–1912); Wills & Cooper (1918–1942)
- Buildings: 10 Trinity Square

Sir Thomas Edwin Cooper RA FRIBA (21 October 1874 – 24 July 1942) was an English architect. His work has been described as "essentially Classical, and sometimes powerfully Baroque."

== Personal life ==
Cooper was born in Scarborough, North Yorkshire, the son of Samuel Cooper, a local carriage proprietor. He married Mary Emily Welburn in 1898.

== Career ==
Cooper's mother recognised his interest in buildings and talent in drawing them, and at a young age was apprenticed to local architects John Hall and Frank Tugwell from 1885 to 1889. Cooper subsequently worked as an assistant for Walter Green Penty, Demaine and Brierley, and Goldie, Child and Goldie. In 1893, he returned to Scarborough to re-join John Hall, and along with Herbert Davis, formed Hall, Cooper and Davis.

The firm opened a London office in 1895, but Cooper continued to work independently as well. Cooper was particularly adept at winning competitions, and several of his commissions, including the Royal Star and Garter Home, Hull's Guildhall and Lloyd's were derived in this way. In the early 1900s Cooper entered into partnership with Samuel Bridgman Russell, however this partnership ended in 1912. Cooper entered into partnership with Herbert Winkler Wills and John Anderson from 1918.

Cooper went on to design Marylebone Town Hall and Library, the headquarters of the Port of London Authority (at 10 Trinity Square) and the offices of Lloyd's, Leadenhall Street. He also designed the war memorial at Cranleigh School in 1921 and subsequently the substantial Connaught Block and Devonport Speech Hall (1930).

Cooper was elected a Fellow of the Royal Institute of British Architects in 1903, and was knighted for his work in 1923. On 24 April 1930 Cooper was elected an Associate Member of the Royal Academy of Arts and on 22 April 1937 he was elected a Royal Academician. In 1931 he received further distinction when he was awarded the Royal Gold Medal for architecture by the Royal Institute of British Architects. Cooper was a member of the Council of the Royal Academy of Arts from 1938 to 1939 and from 1941 to 1942. Cooper was made Treasurer of the Royal Academy of Arts on 5 December 1940.

He died of a heart attack on 24 June 1942, whilst at work in London as the Treasurer of the Royal Academy of Arts.
