= Albert Hodge =

Albert Hemstock Hodge (17 July 1875 – 31 December 1917 or 27 January 1918) was a Scottish born sculptor.

Hodge was born at Port Ellen, on the island of Islay and he studied at the Glasgow School of Art under William Kellock Brown. Initially he worked as an architect with William Leiper, but his ability as a modeller led him to continue his career as a sculptor. His works include a statue (in Glasgow) of Queen Victoria and a statue (in Stirling) of Robert Burns.

In 1901 he moved to London, where he died in 1917 or 1918.

== Selected work ==
Much of Hodge's work was architectural sculpture;-

- Maritime Prowess and Strength: two sculptures c.1903 on the end pavilions of Hull Guildhall. The former depicts a female figure standing at the prow of a boat drawn by seahorses and is often erroneously described as Boadicea.
- Manitoba Legislative Building, Canada
- Two statues in the style of Classical Greek sculpture outside the Glamorgan Building in Cardiff, Wales.
