= William Haywood (engineer) =

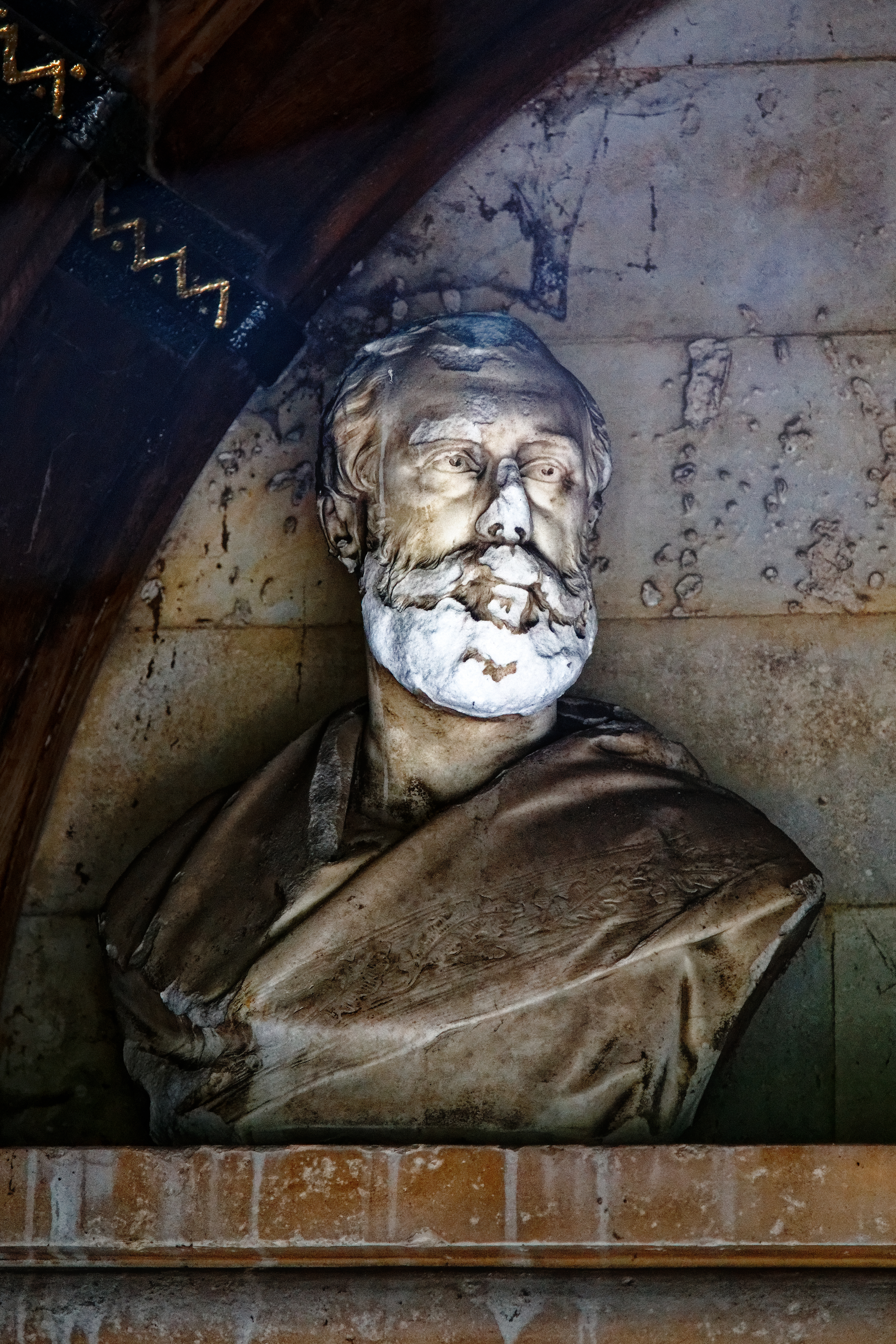
William Haywood

William J. Haywood (8 December 1821 – 13 April 1894) was an English surveyor and an engineer to the City of London Commissioners of Sewers. He was also known as an architect.

== Personal life ==
William Haywood was born as the eldest of three children in Camberwell. His father was probably also called William Haywood. Nothing is known about his mother. In the census of 1871 he was no longer alone and living in Maida Vale.

He died at 56 Hamilton Terrace, Maida Vale, on 13 April 1894.

== Education ==
He was probably educated in Camberwell. There are records suggesting he went to Camberwell Grammar School. Later he trained with George Aitchison (1792–1861).

== Work ==
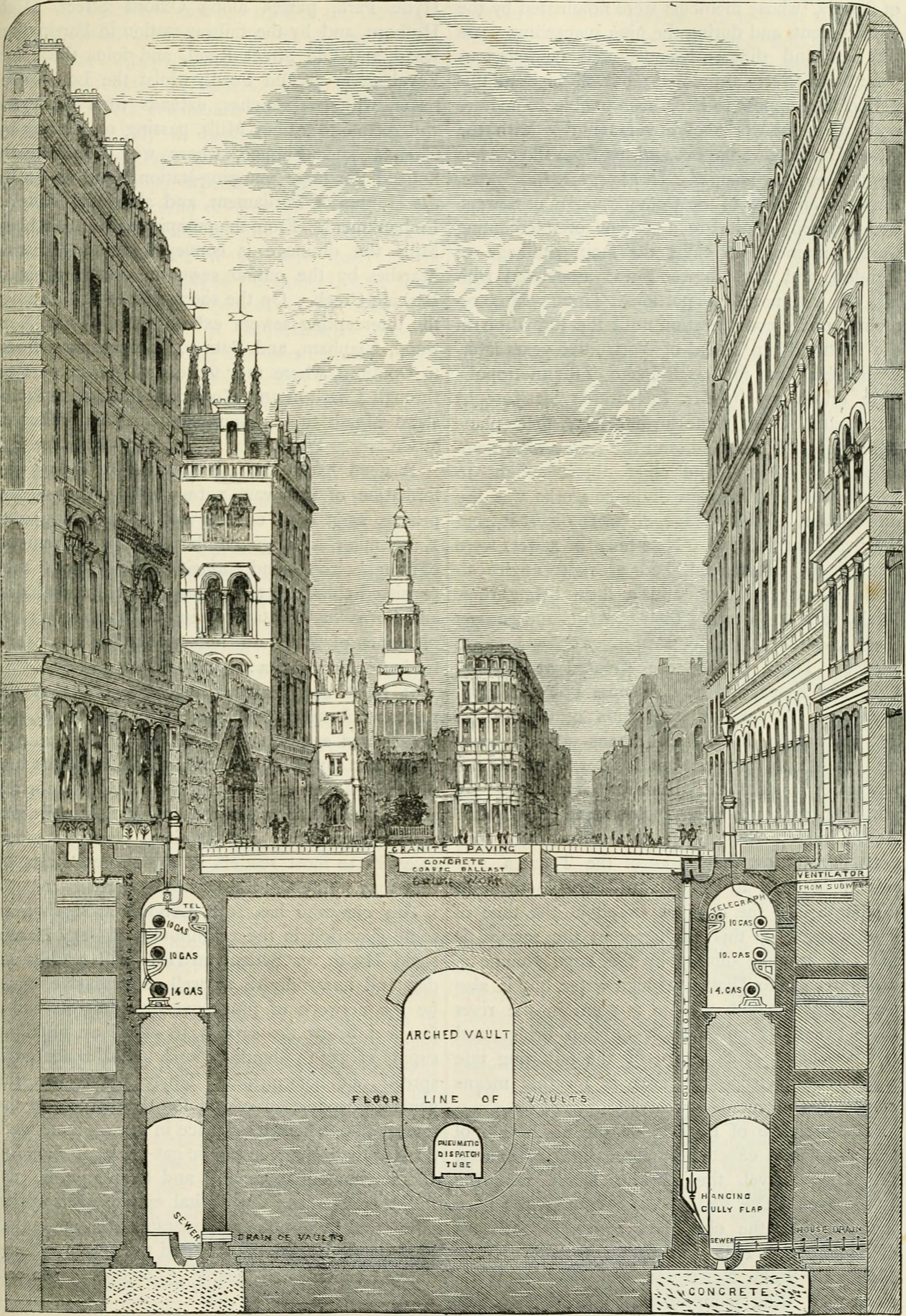
Section of the Holborn Viaduct showing the subways, taken from his report for the Metropolitan Board of Works

With Joseph Bazalgette he was responsible for the enormous undertaking of improving the London sewerage system, which enabled the growth of the city (Abbey Mills pumping station). He worked with James Bunning on the Holborn Viaduct.

His main work is the City of London Cemetery and Crematorium. The facility was built near Little Ilford (now Manor Park) as a way of relieving the appalling overcrowding of London's church burial grounds (described e.g. in Dickens's 'Bleak House'). As the City was redeveloped the remains from many of its churchyards were reinterred there. Haywood was a pioneer of cemetery reform.

He was a Lieutenant-Colonel of the London Volunteer Rifle Brigade.

There is a small Gothic mausoleum, containing his ashes, near the gates of The City of London Cemetery and Crematorium.

== Other activities ==
In 1858, Haywood was one of the founders of the Geologists' Association.

In an article published in 2002, John Patrick Pattinson suggested that Haywood was the pseudonymous "Walter", the author of the erotic memoir, My Secret Life.
