= Grade II listed buildings in the City of London (EC2) =

The City of London, a unique local authority area governed by the City of London Corporation, is a major business and financial centre in London, England. It contains over 600 listed buildings that are recorded in the National Heritage List for England. Of these, over 400 are assessed to be at Grade II, the lowest grade. This list contains the Grade II listed buildings in the EC2 postal district of the city.

== Buildings ==
Name and location	Photograph	Date	Notes
Basildon House; 51.51525°N 0.08987°W		Late 19th century	The ground floor of the house is of pink granite, whilst the first and second floors are of Portland stone with giant composite attached columns of polished granite. Originally the building had two attic storeys, however the building has since been heightened with the addition of a further two.
63-73, Moorgate; 51.51705°N 0.08904°W		Early to mid-19th century	A four-storey terrace with a stuccoed exterior, with the centre four being slightly recessed. The roof has a part balustrade, part parapet surround.
4, Moorgate; 51.51518°N 0.08922°W		Early 20th century	Now serving as a public house, the early 20th century building is of three stone-faced storeys, with a further dormed roof storey recessed behind the parapet. A series of giant unfluted Corinthian columns joined the cornices of first and second floors.
56 to 60, New Broad Street; 51.51678°N 0.08421°W		Early 20th century	The early 20th century office block had its ground floor altered by C. F. A. Voysey, which is the reason for listing. There is a hanging metal sign to exterior, alongside an entrance door with ornamental hinges. Inside, the front office retains two chimney pieces of either black marble or slate, a single panel of stained glass, and a plain oak wainscoat with a cupboard. An oak staircase with newels and plain balusters is extant.
62, New Broad Street; 51.51679°N 0.08421°W		Early 20th century	The building was formerly a part of the same premises as numbers 56–60, however is now a separate property. Interior fittings include an extant chimney piece, wainscot, and five stained glass panels.
Shield House; 51.51710°N 0.07976°W		Late 18th century	The six storey property was formerly part of the Cutler Street Warehouses belonging to the Port of London Authority, and is of a pink-yellow brick construction with slight dressings of Portland stone, a stuccoed ground storey, and a slated roof above a parapet. The centre of the building is recessed, with a modern entranceway contained within this, and in the recession is an archway into the left hand wing.
7, Adams Court, 13–17, Old Broad Street; 51.51478°N 0.08504°W		1861	Designed by Edward Norton Clifton in the palazzo style, the building consists of four stone-faced storeys, with the front elevation slightly bowed in order to follow the line of the street. An entrance at the western end of the front elevation is flanked by a pair of Doric half columns underneath an entablature, and there is a further subsidiary entrance at the eastern end.
123, Old Broad Street; 51.51500°N 0.08560°W		Mid-19th century	The public house consisting of four storeys has Gothic stone-faced ground and first floors, alongside second and third floors of gault brick and stone dressings. A slightly projecting central bay contains a round-headed entrance door on the ground floor.
National Westminster Bank; 51.51358°N 0.08949°W		1929	Built in 1929 to a design by Sir Edwin Cooper for the National Provincial Bank, the building consists of five storeys with a further two attic storeys- one of these being recessed. Constructed from stone in the classical style, there is a mezzanine above the second floor cornice with giant detached Corinthian columns rising up to the attics. The building was internally altered in the late 20th century, however retained its D-shaped bankin hall.
Ye Olde Dr Butler's Head Public House; 51.51570°N 0.09055°W		Early 19th century	The pub has an irregular shape and is constructed from yellow brick. The ground floor is set more forward than the other two above, and has an altered shop front of mid-19th-century origin. The rear of the building has been rebuilt.
6, Lothbury; 51.51483°N 0.08912°W		1932	The building is now in use as Persia International Bank and is of Portland stone construction, with a rear of white-glazed brick. There are three round-arched openins, including one door, in the ground floor with decorative ironwork in front of the windows. There is an added attic of brick on top of the original six storeys.
6, Frederick's Place; 51.51405°N 0.09146°W		Late 18th century	Now serving as the livery hall for The Mercers' Company, the lower three storeys are of pinkish brick construction, whilst the top storey is presumably an addition in yellow brick. The front of the property has a line of railings with a lamp arch.
7, Frederick's Place; 51.51405°N 0.09130°W		Late 18th century	The building is of similar character to number 6, the ground storey has been altered and stuccoed, and the top storey is an addition of yellow brick.
Port of London Authority's Warehouses and Boundary Walls to Middlesex Street and New Street; 51.51709°N 0.07873°W		Late 18th century	A former warehouse in service with the Port of London Authority, the listing consists of a large group of buildings round a number of fully and partially enclosed courtyards. The buildings are mainly of six storeys, with the top one being an addition, and are built with pink-yellow bricks with some dressings of Portland stone. The loading doors are timber framed and have modern gantries, and the roof is of slate with a parapet surrounding. The New Street elevation has been much altered. The inside is of a timber-frame construction with those on the lower storeys being well-finished, and thin cast iron columns support the top storey which has timber queen post roof trusses. There is also a high panelled wall facing both Middlesex Street and New Street.
12 and 13, Devonshire Square; 51.51681°N 0.07916°W		Mid-18th century	Number 13 currently serves as the livery hall of the Worshipful Company of Coopers. Both properties are of four stories of yellow brick with painted bands, and have identical doorways with columns and pediments over. Number 12 has a slated roof, whilst number 13's is tiled. Metal railings surround the front of the properties, and number has an extant timber staircase inside.
53, Coleman Street; 51.51554°N 0.08988°W		Mid to late 19th century	A tall, narrow classical building of Portland stone with carved decorations. The building has four storeys, are there are a pair of decorative cast iron columns to the ground floor of the front elevation, yet no entrance.
54 and 55, Coleman Street; 51.51560°N 0.08984°W		Undated	The building is similar to numbers 51 and 52 but has a decorative cast iron column mounted on a pedestal to the ground floor window, and also has a slightly different doorway.
Finsbury House; 51.51745°N 0.08518°W		1893–94	Designed by Gordon, Lowther & Gunton in an enriched classical style, consisting of five stone-faced storeys on a corner plot. The corner has a curved three-bay entranceway incorporating polished granite columns supporting a curved entablature and low balustrade. The elevations facing Blomfield Street and Finsbury Circus have a set of Corinthian columns on channelled ground storey bases rising to the third storey. The front elevations have cast iron basement railings surrounding.
13, Austin Friars; 51.51590°N 0.08563°W		Late 19th century	The building is of four storeys and a garret. The ground floor is of painted stone, and it has a slate mansard roof.
23, Austin Friars; 51.51564°N 0.08616°W		1888	Constructed in 1888 to a design by Sir Aston Webb and Ingress Bell, with a Portland stone front to the three storey building.
7 and 9, Bishopsgate; 51.51404°N 0.08435°W		Late 19th century	A five-storey building of stone and pink marble, with the end bay of each address set forward slightly and containing entrances. The ground floor has pink marble pilasters supporting an entablature, with further stone pilasters rising through the first and second storeys. A pilastered attic storey is present with a number of large modern dormers.
52-68, Bishopsgate; 51.51527°N 0.08233°W		1928	The building is of a design by Mewès and Davis, consisting of a classical stone façade over five storeys, with a further stone-faced attic and a steep slate roof with stone chimney stacks. The base of the building has a low plinth with which a series of Doric pilasters rise from and unite the ground and first floors. The building has a central square arch leading through to St Helen's Place, that has a set of wrought iron gates mounted with the coat of arms of the Worshipful Company of Leathersellers.
162 and 164, Bishopsgate; 51.51722°N 0.08039°W		1885	Designed by George John Vulliamy as a fire station, the building is of a Tudor Gothic style and constructed from Portland stone. It is of four storeys with a tile roof covering, and has four large arches across the ground floor.
8, Bishopsgate Churchyard; 51.51667°N 0.08287°W		1894–95	Former Victorian Turkish baths, the building is of the Islamic style, and is constructed from faience tiles, terracotta, and brick. The building is laid out in a rectangle with a polygonal apse to the east elevation; this apse is topped with a copper octagonal lantern stained glass windows, surmounted with a coloured glass onion dome with a star and crescent finial rising out of it. It is of a single storey with a flat roof, but has two main rooms underground that are accessed through a staircase in the apse. The east elevation also has a star-shaped window flanked by two lancet windows on each side, all of stained glass. The entrance is on the north side of the building, and inside the walls are of pink, green, and white tiles.
Monument to John Heminge and Henry Condell in Former Churchyard of Church of St Mary Aldermanbury; 51.51638°N 0.09305°W		1896	The monument is situated in the former churchyard of St Mary Aldermanbury, which was destroyed in the Second World War. The monument is dedicated to John Heminges and Henry Condell, both members of the King's Men for which William Shakespeare wrote for. A bronze bust of his head surmounts the inscribed pedestal of pink and grey granite.
Midland Bank; 51.51394°N 0.08560°W		1856	The building formerly served as the head office of City Bank and subsequently Midland Bank, and has now been converted to a restaurant. Number 5, Threadneedle Street is situated on a corner site and was the first part of the building to be built. It was later extended to the east as number 6, and together they are four storeys with stone facing to the front elevation. The building has also been extended to the rear to Finch Lane, which is of a plainer design to the Threadneedle Street elevation. The entrance to the building at the northeast in a rounded corner with a lunette over.
32, Threadneedle Street; 51.51420°N 0.08478°W		1919–20	The building is of a classical design of Portland stone, and incorporates a 17th-century entranceway into Merchant Taylors' Hall on the right hand side. It is three storeys tall, and its facade continues in a simplified manner to numbers 28 and 29, and number 34 on the opposite side.
Lloyds Bank; 51.51426°N 0.08417°W		Late 19th century	A former Lloyds Bank branch built in the classical style in the late 19th century. The building is built of stone with the entranceway situated on a rounded corner, and has three storeys with a slate mansard roof. A large circular lantern with a small cupola sits on top of the corner.
Gateway and Railings to Forecourt of Number 40; 51.51438°N 0.08444°W		Late 19th century	A set of late 19th-century wrought iron gates and cast iron railings, that mark the boundary to the forecourt of number 40, Threadneedle Street. An overthrow containing a crown and shield with the letters NBP sits over the gates.
41, Threadneedle Street; 51.51446°N 0.08461°W		c1900	Former banking hall that was the head office of the International Westminster Bank built to a design by John Macvicar Anderson. It consists of 5 storeys of a stone construction with a rusticated ground floor. There is a single storey wing to the rear that fronts onto Adams Court.
Carpenters' Hall; 51.51665°N 0.08593°W		1876–80	Livery hall for the Worshipful Company of Carpenters that was originally designed by William Willmer Pocock, but was heightened and had its interior wholly rebuilt behind the facade by Whinney, Son & Austen Hall in the mid-20th century, following Second World War bomb damage. The building of a steel-frame construction with concrete slabs, with the front and rear elevations being of Portland stone underneath a lead roof. It consists of four storeys over a basement, and has a five-bay arcade at the ground storey leading to a day entrance. The main entrance is situated at the east elevation underneath a bridge that connects the hall to 2, Throgmarton Avenue. The ground floor contains the reception room, court room, and porter's room, whilst the first floor largely consists of the banqueting hall running east–west alongside the court luncheon room. The second floor contains the Master's quarters, court drawing room, bedrooms, a record store, and office-space- alongside the top two storeys.
28 and 29, Threadneedle Street; 51.51412°N 0.08513°W		1910	Built in 1910 as a branch of the Bank of New South Wales in the classical style, it consists of three storeys of stone with a grey granite base. The walls of the ground floor are channelled, and the right hand side has an entrance with grey granite architrave with an oval window above. A slate roof tops the building with tall chimney stacks rising out.
Gates at Rear of Number 40 Leading to Pathway at Rear of City of London Club; 51.51474°N 0.08456°W	—	1833	A set of 19th-century wrought iron gates at the rear of number 40, Threadneedle Street, with a central shield and the lettering NPBE.
43-47, Threadneedle Street; 51.51438°N 0.08493°W		1890	Former bank branch of the Bank of Montreal of four storeys and a slated mansard roof with a series of dormers. The ground storey has a Tuscan granite columns topped with a granite frieze, and wrought iron basement railings in between the columns.
26, Throgmorton Street; 51.51498°N 0.08576°W		Mid-19th century	Mid-19th century property that was originally built as two separate buildings. The western building is of four storeys with a rendered front in modified Italianate style, and has a balcony on the second floor. The eastern building is also of four storeys of a Gothic style with an acraded front of Portland stone and a slate roof.
5, Copthall Buildings, 11 Tokenhouse Yard; 51.51552°N 0.08797°W		1872	Four storey red brick building, with a single storey entrance wing projecting into Tokenhouse Yard. This contains sculpted stone doorcase in a 17th-century style.
12, Austin Friars; 51.51589°N 0.08544°W		1883	Currently serves as the livery hall for the Worshipful Company of Furniture Makers, it is of a red brick construction over three storeys. The ground floor is channelled and has a large stone hood over the entrance doorway. There is a plain attic with pedimented dormer windows.
3, King Street and 92, Cheapside; 51.51417°N 0.09207°W		1836	The building was originally constructed in 1836 from a design by Thomas Hopper, however was rebuilt internally and heightened after Second World War bomb damage. It served as the head office of the Atlas Assurance Company and is of Portland stone, less than the arcaded ground storey which is of grey granite. The building consists of three storeys with a further two storey, irregular, slated mansard attic. The King Street elevation is slightly plainer in design, with an arched entrance topped with a carved figure of Atlas at the far end, and the Ironmonger Lane elevation is plainer still. A large, modern, bracketed clock is mounted centrally on the Cheapside elevation.
51 and 52, Coleman Street; 51.51546°N 0.08990°W		Mid to late 19th century	A classical three storey building situated on a corner plot, with a simple ground floor of polished granite, and remaining storeys of Portland stone with pink granite columns. The ground floor had two doorways, with one having subsequently been converted into a window.
Park House and Garden House; 51.51819°N 0.08551°W		1920–21	The listing includes numbers 26–31, Eldon Street which are to the rear of Finsbury Circus. Designed by Gordon & Gunton, and built by S. Pearson & Co. of a stone-clad steel frame, and a slate mansard roof with cast iron cresting. The building is curved, following the line of the crescent, and consists of six storeys and an attic. The rear façade is stone-clad, in a more simplified classical style.
4, Frederick's Place; 51.51432°N 0.09149°W		Late 18th century	The single storey, late 18th-century building is similar to number 3 in construction, however it has a stuccoed ground storey. The roof is of slate with a series of dormers, and a set of plainer railings and lamp arch are situated outside.
8, Frederick's Place; 51.51406°N 0.09114°W		Late 18th century	Situated on a corner plot, the former house is similar in character to number 6, less a first floor sill band and a plain entablature below the additional top storey. There are two windows rising from a stuccoed basement to the Old Jewry elevation, and corniced doorway and Venetian window set to the Frederick's Place elevation.
The Mayor's and City of London Court; 51.51530°N 0.09131°W		1893	Court building of rock=faced stone with ashlar dressings, consisting of two storeys at the front elevation and three at the rear, facing Basinghall Street. There is a slightly recessed three-bay main entrance on the front elevation, of an arched central door with carved spandrels. The roof is of slate, and over the east range is a stone turret with a lead spirelet, alongside an octagonal lantern with an ogee lead cupola to the west.
11, Ironmonger Lane; 51.51461°N 0.09135°W		Mid to late 18th century	The house is of five storeys, one being a later addition, and is constructed from pink-yellow bricks. The stuccoed ground storey projects from the building, and continues across a recessed north wing of yellow brick. On this face is a painted doorway with Ionic columns and a pediment over, alongside a low metal railing across the front. Beneath the property is a 3rd-century Roman house of ragstone walls and a patterned mosaic pavement.
Remains of Tower to Former Church of St Alphage; 51.51770°N 0.09219°W		14th century	Ruined lower part of the central tower of St Alphege London Wall, that was gutted by fire in the Second World War after the remainder of the church was previously demolished in the early 20th century. Of a flint and rubble masonry construction with archways in three sides, and has the south wall missing.
3 and 4, Lothbury, 1–5, Moorgate; 51.51499°N 0.09001°W		1906	The building was constructed by Mountford and Gruning for the Northern Assurance Company. The four main storeys are stone-faced. The elevation that fronts onto Lothbury has curved corners at either end, and the centres to the front and side elevations are recessed with attached unfluted Ionic columns rising from the first to third floors. The attic is of a further two storeys.
Gateway to Number 21; 51.51742°N 0.07868°W		Mid-19th century	A mid-19th-century stuccoed archway, with two pairs of rusticated Doric pilasters supporting an entablature. The high blocking above has consoles either side, and a figure of a ram on top.
1, Old Broad Street; 51.51426°N 0.08594°W		1903	A stone-faced, five storey former bank building, which is laid out on a triangular plot with a rounded corner bay. A plain recessed upper attic storey replaces a previously steep roof.
35, Old Jewry; 51.51399°N 0.09116°W		Late 18th century	Consists of four storeys of yellow brick, with the ground storey being of painted stucco.
Business School, London Metropolitan University; 51.51772°N 0.08819°W		1900–03	The building was formerly called Electra House, and was designed by Belcher and Joass as the head office of Cable & Wireless. It consists of five storeys of stone on a granite podium, with a slate roof and central dome topped with a sculpture by Sir George Frampton. The entrance is located on the front elevation, and is a two storey high round arched located centrally with a stone glass window depicting wireless communications. Giant Corinthian columns adorn the front face between the second and third storeys, and a two-storey oriel is located at the left hand corner. The building was later taken over by subsequent educational institutions, with the current being the Fashion Retail Academy.
K2 Telephone Kiosk, Outside Number 6 Copthall Chambers; 51.51565°N 0.08801°W		c1927	K2 type public telephone kiosk as designed by Sir Giles Gilbert Scott. Consists of a square kiosk of cast iron painted in red, topped with a domed roof, and with perforated crowns adorning the top panel on each face.
80, Coleman Street; 51.51677°N 0.08933°W		Early to mid-18th century	A former house now converted into office use of three storeys and a further attic storey. The ground floor was rebuilt in the 20th century, with the present entrance being on the left hand side with Portland stone Doric columns flanking the door and rising to a cornice. The interior has an original open well staircase and accoutrements.
Police Public Callbox Outside St Lawrence Jewry Next to Guildhall; 51.51530°N 0.09218°W		c1935	Constructed from cast iron, the rectangular police public call box has a segmented arched head with a narrow projecting hood. A globular light sits on top encased in a small, flat-topped cupola on a stepped base. The front face of the box consists of a set of instructions set behind a door with a replaced glass face, with an opening name plate and embossed coat of arms above. There are 2 further flush doors beneath.
Police Public Callbox, Corner of Old Broad Street and Adams Court; 51.51481°N 0.08540°W		c1935	Constructed from cast iron, the rectangular police public call box has a segmented arched head with a narrow projecting hood. On top, a stepped base is surmounted by a narrow rectangular post with an arched head, supporting a globular light in a small, flat-topped cupola. The front face of the box consists of a set of instructions set behind a door with a replaced glass face, with an opening name plate and embossed coat of arms above. There are 2 further flush doors beneath.
Wall to Rear of Numbers 4 to 18 (Even) Which Are Not of Special Architectural or Historical Interest; 51.51700°N 0.08032°W	—	Late 16th century	Approximately 45 metres of walls consisting of red brick set in English bond, which originally formed part of Fisher's Folly. It includes two stone-mullioned windows with architrave, and iron bars.
87, Moorgate; 51.51782°N 0.08881°W		Early 19th century	Originally a four-storey terraced house that has now been converted to a ground floop shop and offices above. It is of red brick construction with stucco dressings, and a 20th-century shopfront.
The Globe Public House; 51.51766°N 0.08880°W		Early 19th century	Early 19th century public house of four storeys with the upper floors having been re-fronted in the 1870s, and the ground floor and interior altered in the late 20th century. The building is stuccoed and designed in a classical French style, with a 20th-century frontage on the ground floor.
Former Fox's Umbrellas; 51.51770°N 0.08899°W		Early 19th century	Four storey stuccoed building, with the ground floor being altered when Fox's Umbrellas began trading from the property. This shop's front is still extant with recessed non-reflective, cursed glass plate windows. The shop interior also still retains its polished wood and glass fixtures and fittings, along with mirrors and stairs. The upper floors contain late 19th century stairs, fireplaces and wallpaper.
2, Moorfields, 118A, London Wall; 51.51768°N 0.08889°W		Early 19th century	An end terrace house with a shop later added to the ground floor. The four storey building is of yellow brick construction with stucco dressings. The ground floor shopfront is of 20th-century origin with a corner entrance, and a further entrance to the upper floors on the right hand side. The London Wall elevation has a cast iron plaque of the City's coat of arms above the central first floor window.
8, Moorfields; 51.51782°N 0.08881°W		Early 19th century	A three-storey, yellow stock brick house with a 20th-century shop front on the ground floor. A low parapet surrounds the roof.
Police Call Box Outside Liverpool Street Station; 51.51747°N 0.08228°W		c1935	Constructed from cast iron, the rectangular police public call box has a segmented arched head with a narrow projecting hood. A globular light sits on top encased in a small, flat-topped cupola on a stepped base. The front face of the box consists of a set of instructions set behind a door with a replaced glass face, with an opening name plate and embossed coat of arms above. There are 2 further flush doors beneath.
Drinking Fountain and Shelter, North Side of Gardens; 51.51809°N 0.08632°W		1902	The structure was designed by J. Whitehead & Sons for the Metropolitan Drinking Fountain and Cattle Trough Association, and consists of a circular pink granite fountain with original brass sprouts, covered with a wooden box framed gazebo with a conical tiled roof. Both are mounted on a circular stone plinth.
Whitbread's Brewery Buildings (That Part in London Borough of Islington); 51.52046°N 0.09087°W	—	Mid to late 19th century	Part of the former Whitbread Brewery, the series of buildings are of yellow brick laid in Flemish bond, with dressings of blue and white brick. The front face looks to be two blocks with the southern portion of two storeys and the northern of three. There is a two-storey round-arch opening in each block of 20th-century origin, the roof is lined with a parapet surmounted with an iron railing.
4, Moorfields; 51.51774°N 0.08893°W		Early 19th century	An early 19th-century house with later shop added to the ground floor. It is of yellow stock brick with a 20th-century shopfront.
K2 Telephone Kiosk; 51.51577°N 0.08641°W		c1927	K2 type public telephone kiosk as designed by Sir Giles Gilbert Scott. Consists of a square kiosk of cast iron painted in red, topped with a domed roof, and with perforated crowns adorning the top panel on each face.
Roman Catholic Church of St Mary Moorfields; 51.51886°N 0.08562°W		1890–1902	The church was designed by George Campbell Sherrin replacing an earlier church on the same site, and incorporating elements of the east end into the structure. The front of the church is set in a plain office building of grey ashlar stonework, with a round-arched entrance surmounted by a Virgin and Child crowned with angels above. Reliefs above the ground floor windows have scenes of the life of the Virgin Mary. It is the only Roman Catholic church in the City of London.
40, Threadneedle Street; 51.51461°N 0.08455°W		Late 19th century	The building consists of two main storeys with a recessed attic and two further roof storeys, and was built for the Oriental Bank Corporation. The narrow front onto Threadneedle Street is of brown stone and a slated mansard roof, recessed into a forecourt. The ground floor has an archway, with a large central Venetian window and figure carving over it.
34, Threadneedle Street; 51.51421°N 0.08456°W		1930–31	The three storey office building is of austere stone, and was designed by Campbell-Jones, Sons & Smithers.
76-80, Old Broad Street; 51.51738°N 0.08339°W		c1860	An Italianate stone façade to four storeys with modern shopfronts and a central rounded-arch entrance on the ground floor. The return elevations are plain and of yellow brick.
Liverpool Street Station; 51.51862°N 0.08154°W		1873–75	Railway station built by Edward Wilson for the Great Eastern Railway as their London terminus, which was significantly remodelled in the late 20th century by Nick Derbyshire. To the north of the site, the 1870s western trainshed is constructed from Suffolk stock brick with Bath stone dressings, with the roof a mix of wrought and cast iron columns and trusses. One wall of red brick with Bath stone dressings from the 1890s trainshed survives with it having been rebuilt in steel with facing stock brick. Only these trainsheds are included in the listed status.
42 and 44, Gresham Street; 51.51491°N 0.09197°W		1850	An Italianate four storey corner building, designed by Sancton Wood with entrance being on a canted corner with a two-storey window being situated above.
Royal Bank of Scotland; 51.51378°N 0.08429°W		1877	Built in 1877 as the first English branch of the Royal Bank of Scotland and now a branch of HSBC. It has four stone-faced storeys, with the ground and first floor consisting of seven bays separated by two storey tall Ionic columns. The slate roof has a series of dormers adorned with ball finials.
46, Bishopsgate; 51.51497°N 0.08264°W		Mid-18th century	The building was re-fronted in the 19th century and the four storeys are now of yellow stock brick underneath a slate roof. A modern shopfront adorns the ground floor and remnants of the original interior panelling are extant.
13 and 14, Basinghall Street; 51.51570°N 0.09084°W		Mid-19th century	A red brick and Portland stone office building with a pair of shops on the ground floor that are separated by piers. The building consists of four storeys, and the top has a circular window in a central, gable breaking cornice.
14, Austin Friars; 51.51590°N 0.08563°W		1882	The building consists of a painted stone ground floor, with four further red brick storeys above. A plain attic with an additional storey tops the building, with a stone balustrade to the front face.
Barbican; 51.51920°N 0.09460°W		1962–82	A large inner-city brutalist estate consisting of approximately 2,000 flats, maisonettes, and houses; alongside a hostel, girls' school, music and drama school, and arts centre. It was constructed to the designs of Chamberlin, Powell and Bon for the City of London Corporation. It is largely constructed of poured in-situ concrete, with the exposed surfaces pick-hammered or bush-hammered, with cladding of glazed engineering brick to some buildings. The roofs are flat and of asphalt with concrete tiles laid on top.
British Linen Bank; 51.51455°N 0.08400°W		1902	Built to a design by John Macvicar Anderson for the British Linen Bank, the building is of four storeys of Portland, with a balustrade surrounding a pilastered attic storey. The entrance is located centrally in the front face with a segmented pediment over, supported by Doric columns. The frontage has end pavilions either side, with the centre thus slightly recessed.
Gates Leading to Number 40 From Adams Court; 51.51461°N 0.08478°W		1833	Set of early 19th-century large wrought iron double gates, with a central arch over the top containing the lettering NPBE and 1833.
23, 24 and 25, Great Winchester Street; 51.51625°N 0.08593°W		1925	Originally occupied by Morgan, Grenfell & Co., and now by its successor Deutsche Bank, the building was designed by Mewès and Davis. It consists of three storeys of a stone construction, with the ground floor being channelled, and containing an entrance door on the left hand side with a rope-twist surround and pediment. Above this a door three-bay deep concave is set back into the building. A balustraded parapet surrounds the attic level.
Footings to Former Church of St Mary the Virgin; 51.51650°N 0.09304°W		1437 (probable)	Footings belonging to the parish church of St Mary Aldermanbury which was destroyed in the Second World War. The footings are medieval in origin, and were reused after the church's first destruction in the Great Fire of London. They are constructed from rubble and dressed stone.
48, Bishopsgate; 51.51503°N 0.08266°W		Late 19th century	An elaborate stone building of four storeys and a roof storey, built in the Second Empire style. The ground floor consists of a large square-headed window and a round-arched entrance. The parapet is mounted with wrought iron rails, and there also wrought iron entrance gates and foot scrapers to the ground floor.
St Botolphs Church Hall; 51.51680°N 0.08215°W		1861	Church hall situated in the churchyard of the parish church of St Botolph-without-Bishopsgate. A single storey building of red brick and Portland stone with a slated roof, the entrance is flanked by a pair of Doric columns, and a lunette window sits above. A pair of modern replica stone figures sit in niches either side of the entrance.
2 Drinking Fountains, 3 Overthrows and Lanterns; 51.51651°N 0.08151°W		Late 19th century	The items are all situated in the churchyard of the parish church of St Botolph-without-Bishopsgate. It includes a pair of stone piers flanking the entranceway with bowls set in niches with a brass tap over, which were gifted by the churchwardens and Charles Gilpin. A set of three wrought iron overthrows and railings adorned with Windsor lanterns, however the westernmost one is missing an arm and the lantern.
3, Frederick's Place; 51.51426°N 0.09122°W		Late 18th century	A four-storey building, with an additional two storeys in a slated mansard roof, constructed from yellow brick with slight painted dressings. The first floor has a sill band with wrought iron balconies mounted to the windows, and area railings and lamp arch to the front face. (Right building in image)
Gresham College; 51.51514°N 0.09131°W		1912	Three storey building of stone, built in the classical style, with a tall base owing to the high basement and a slated roof with dormers. A series of giant Ionic columns rises through the first and second floors. The round-headed entrance consists of a door of 17th-century origin, with blocked Roman Doric fluted columns supporting a broken triangular pediment with Cherubs's heads, garland, and a Gresham grasshopper. The building was formerly used by Gresham College, but is now private office space.
Irish Chamber; 51.51535°N 0.09187°W		1824–25	The building is situated on a corner plot and is of yellow brick and stucco. It consists of two storeys plus a slate mansard roof, and forms part of the City of London Corporation's premises.
Moorgate Underground Station; 51.51855°N 0.08840°W		1900	London Underground station designed by T. P. Figgis and built of red brick with a Portland stone ground floor with upper floor dressings, all under a slate roof. The six storey building is sited on a corner plot and has large segmental-headed arches containing the station entrance and a modern shopfront. The front corner above the ground storey is of a round tower with columns reaching down either side of the shop entrance, and has a leaded dome on top. Inside, the ticket hall was remodelled in the early 20th century, and much of the original exterior is no longer extant.
5-7, New Street; 51.51728°N 0.07950°W		Late 18th century	A terrace of three former houses of four storeys each, constructed from pinkish yellow brick with a parapet. The entranceways have identical pedimented doorcases with flanking Corinthian columns, and numbers 5 and 6 have area railings to the front elevation.
London Wall Buildings; 51.51725°N 0.08572°W		1901	Large early 20th-century stone office block, as designed by Gordon & Gunton, that constitutes the southeast block of Finsbury Circus. The building is of six storeys, with seven storey projecting pavilions located either end, and centrally. The main entrance is on Finsbury Circus, and consists of a two-storey porch with a round-arched opening, with a rebated broken pediment mounted above, and smaller round-arched entrances flanking either side. A number of smaller entrances are located on Blomfield Street and London Wall. A curved corner on London Wall is topped with a metal-sheathed dome with elaborate dormers, and a further curved and rebated corner to Circus Place has a round-arched entrance leading into the banking hall.
Salisbury House; 51.51761°N 0.08779°W		1901	The block is the southwest element of Finsbury Circus, and was built to a design by Davis & Emmanuel. It consists of four storeys of stone with two further of dormers in the slate roof. The main entrance faces onto Finsbury Circus and is of a round-arched opening with 19th-century wooden doors flanked by double columns, and topped with female figures representing victory and plenty. The block has area railing around the front and side faces, and there exists a further large projecting entrance on Circus Place topped with a Diocletian window in a Dutch gable. There is a curved corner range set in a rebate with Jacobean motifs set into the above bay. The elevation onto London Wall is faced with shopfronts, and a further large round-arched entrance in between polished red granite pilasters.
18, Old Broad Street; 51.51481°N 0.08485°W		1868	A mid-late 19th century Italianate style block of offices, consisting of four storeys of a stone construction. The entrance is situated on the left hand side and topped by a cornice. The block projects slightly forward compared to its neighbours, largely re-developed in the 21st century as part of the Lion Plaze development.
St Vedasts Rectory; 51.51503°N 0.09625°W		1959	The building serves as the rectory for St Vedast Foster Lane and was designed by Stephen Dykes Bower in the Neoclassical style. It consists of a yellow brick construction with red brick dressings, concrete floors, and a flat lead roof. The house has four storeys, to the rear is a covered passageway supported on a set of three piers, and a first floor balcony with 19th century-style iron balustrades. The rear courtyard contains a fountain underneath a red brick open pediment. Inside, the timber stairs with mahogany-wreathed handrail remains, alongside a mural by Hans Feibusch in the first floor living room, a painted timber chimneypiece, and fitted bookshelves.
Former City of London Police Headquarters; 51.51476°N 0.09123°W		1926–30	Completed in 1930, it served as the headquarters of the City of London Police until 2002, and was built on the site of the previous headquarters, with 18th-century doorcases, panelling, and staircase having been reused from the previous building- the principle interest for the listing. The building is laid out in four storeys with an additional modern attic storey, around a truncated L-shape courtyard, and is constructed of red brick laid in English bond with Portland stone sills. A six-storey Portland stone block, through which there is a passageway into the courtyard, forms the façade onto Old Jewry.
The Dutch Church; 51.51550°N 0.08565°W		1950–54	Dutch Reformed Church that was rebuilt in the mid-20th century to a design by Arthur Bailey after the original was destroyed in the Second World War. Its construction consists of a reinforced concrete box frame with external cladding of Portland stone ashlar, and internal cladding of Doulting stone. The roof is hipped and of slate, with some lower flat roofs to the building. It is arranged in a T-shape plan, with a tall fleche on the roof at the junction, with an ogge dome surmounted by a spire. Many of the windows contain stained glass made and donated by various individuals and organisations. A central timber pulpit is raised on a stone dais seated on extant floorstone from the previous church, and a set of stairs lead down to a community hall, library, and columbarium in the basement. The church is the oldest foreign denomination church in the United Kingdom.
The Salters' Hall; 51.51819°N 0.09224°W		1972–76	The modern building serves as the livery hall for the Worshipful Company of Salters, and was built following the destruction of the previous in the Second World War. Built from a concrete frame, with lower floors with aliminum curtain walls and smoke-coloured glass, and upper floors of painted ribbed, knapped, and bush-hammered concrete. The building consists of four storeys of office space topped with a double-height hall, and two further storeys of accommodation that extend out further than the storeys below, with a stair tower and lift tower projecting from the east elevation. The south face is mounted with a bronze Salters' coat of arms at fifth floor level. Inside, the fifth floor contains a long entrance lobby with a shallow vaulted ceiling, with a travertine cantilever staircase beginning here. The livery hall itself is fully lined in ash panelling with corner windows and a gallery, and a gently curved ceiling that conceals the air vents. The above floors contain the ladies' dining room and the Salters' offices.
Signal Box: Liverpool Street London Underground; 51.51746°N 0.08360°W		1875	Designed by McKenzie & Holland, and built in 1875 for the Metropolitan Railway. The locking room consists of yellow stock brick laid in Flemish bond, whilst the operations room is weatherboarded over a timber frame, with a hipepd slate roof. It is located at the western end of the northern Metropolitan and Circle line platform, and has glazed windows all the way around. Inside is panelled with a boarded ceiling, with an original fire surround and 1954 Westinghouse Brake and Signal Company control panel.
Brown Shipley & Co Ltd; 51.51504°N 0.08924°W		1973–75	Head office of Brown Shipley that was designed by Fitzroy Robinson & Partners, and incorporates a single ashlar bay of a previous building on the site to the Founder's Court elevation. Laid out in a five-storey squat T-shape, it is constructed from a frame construction that is clad in polished Swedish Blaubrun granite, with bronze anodised windows. The main entrance is situated on Moorgate, and is a pair of solid bronze doors with a high-relief roundel. The length of this face has bronze screens with abstract low-relief designs mounted at ground level, with both these and the doors being designed by John Poole. The Founder's court bay also has an entrance consisting of a tall arched doorway, with piers flanking, and a keystone depicting God's head mounted above. Above the doorway, on the first floor, is a balustraded balcony inside a double-height surround. To the left of this is the rear of the stair hall, constructed from Portland stone, with a tall doorway and ventilators above that are designed to imitate windows.
1, Finsbury Avenue; 51.51940°N 0.08520°W		1982–84	Built as the first phase to Finsbury Avenue Square by Arup Associates. An office building consisting of eight floors, with an atrium in the centre which has now been converted to an enclosed hall and lightwell above. The ground floor consists of commercial premises including a public house, and there is an underground carpark to the south of the block. Its construction is of a rolled steel frame with light concrete floors and dark bronze-anodised curtain walling, with the external stair towers clad in aluminium sheeting instead. Polished pink-brown granite detailing is present on the ground floor.
20, Aldermanbury; 51.51670°N 0.09224°W		1932–34	Head office of the Chartered Insurance Institute built in a Tudorbethan style of a smooth Portland stone exterior, and a fitted out interior with extensive panelling and other joinery. On oriel is centrally located on the Aldermanbury face between the first and second floors, with the a relief of the institute's coat of arms underneath. The entrance is located on the left hand side of this, consisting of a two-bay arcaded porch with timber double doors leading inside. A large gable conceals the roof with dormers behind. Inside, the great hall is situated on the ground floor with moulded beams and muntin panelling, and stained windows representing different insurance companies. The stairwell is built to a 17th-century style with a large collection of fire plaques mounted on the walls and a 20th-century skylight in the roof, leading up to a smaller similar hall on the second storey. An extension from 1964 is also present.
Ritual Sculpture; 51.51637°N 0.08999°W		1968–69	A modern abstract sculpture by Antanas Braždys made from highly polished stainless steel, mounted on a tubular steel plinth. It consists of a series of four shapes balanced on top of one another.
Bishopsgate Parish Memorial; 51.51658°N 0.08164°W		1916	The first freestanding First World War memorial in London, commemorating men from both the ward and the Honourable Artillery Company who died in the war. It is located in the churchyard of St Botolph-without-Bishopsgate and consists of a wheel-head cross mounted on a cross rising from an octagonal shaft, which sits on an octagonal plinth on a three-step base.
Ceramic Mural of Nine Panels on Cromwell Highwalk, Barbican; 51.51984°N 0.09218°W		c1960	A series of nine panels by Dorothy Annan located in the Barbican. Each panel is composed of 40 tiles, with the subjects of the art being semi-abstract including different items of technology.
Bank of England War Memorial; 51.51402°N 0.08861°W	—	1921	The memorial was initially installed to honour employees of the Bank of England who died in the First World War, with a later rededication for those from the Second World War. It consists of bronze statue of a male, representing St Christopher, with an infant on his back, representing Christ, crossing a stream. It sits on top of a four-stepped plinth constructed from Portland stone mounted with a bronze cross and plaques bearing the names of the fallen.
65 and 65a, Basinghall Street; 51.51658°N 0.09192°W		1966–69	Designed by Richard Gilbert Scott the building was constructed to serves as an exhibition hall and magistrates court, and is now converted into offices. The building's construction is of a concrete frame with milky-cream pre-cast facing panels to the exterior. Above street level, it is arranged in a rough L-shape layout with three levels of below-ground parking beneath of a much larger footprint. The ground floor originally contained the magistrates court and associated ancillaries, with the first floor of two elements (65 and 65a) linked by a canopy. The building's interiors are excluded from the listing.
West Wing, Guildhall; 51.51583°N 0.09258°W		1970–75	Modern west wing extension of the Guildhall as designed by Richard Gilbert Scott, and constructed by Trollope & Colls. The building is of a concrete structure with cladding, floors, and roof of pre-cast concrete panels. The windows are of slender bronze-anodised aluminium frames, and some of the interior polished English elm joinery is still surviving. The building is of an L-shape plan above ground, with the polygonal Alderman's Court projecting from the east elevations and mounted on four columns. The building's basement has a much large footprint, extending under the yard, and contains a carpark, book stores, and back-of-house functions. The ground floor and undercroft forms an arcade facing the Guildhall Yard with a series of wide pointed arches carried on piers. The main elevation has the first floor jettied out from the ground, and thos above jettied again. In the west corner of the yard is the West Ambulatory which is formed of two rows of inverted pyramidal concrete shells on concrete columns, connecting the Wing with the Great Hall of the original building. Inside, the circulation cores, the library reading rooms, the West Ambulatory, and the Aldermen's Court are little altered from their original form, including a number of original fittings still extant.
Great Eastern Railway War Memorial, Liverpool Street Station; 51.51771°N 0.08204°W		1922	War memorial made by Farmer & Brindley dedicated to those workers of the Great Eastern Railway who died in the First World War. It is mounted on the western face of the Great Eastern Hotel in the upper concourse of Liverpool Street Station, where it was repositioned in a late 20th-century remodelling. It is constructed from eleven marble panels inlayed with metal lettering that lists the names of the fallen, flanked by a pair of fluted Roman Doric columns with a carved spiralling wreath wrapped around. A segmental broken pedimented is mounted above, and at the bottom of the memorial are relief portraits of Captain Charles Fryatt and Field Marshal Sir Henry Wilson, Bt. A modern lift has been integrated into the bottom left of the memorial, which is clad in marble.
London Society of East Anglians War Memorial, Liverpool Street Station; 51.51774°N 0.08199°W		1920	Situated next to the Great Eastern Railway War Memorial at Liverpool Street Station, after having been moved during remodelling in the late 20th century. Consists of a carved Portland stone tablet mounted on a black granite backing. Unveiled by the London Society Of East Anglians to commemorate those who died in the First World War from East Anglia.
Ironmongers' Hall, excluding Ferroners' House; 51.51824°N 0.09623°W		1923–25	Livery hall for the Worshipful Company of Ironmongers designed by Sydney Tacthell and extended in the late 20th century by Fitzroy Robinson & Partners. The plasterwork was completed by George Jackson & Sons, the stained glass by Clayton and Bell, and ironwork by FG Frost and William Bainbridge Reynolds. The building is of steel frame construction, with a varied exterior: the front face and southeast corner are of red brick and some timber framing with Portland stone dressings, with stock brick elsewhere- some being painted. The roof is of plain tiles with a number of tall brick chimneys rising from it. Broadly L-shaped in layout, a Portland stone-faced entrance porch projects to the west, with the banquet hall abutting. Inside, the public parts of the building contain a number of oak and wrought iron fixtures, and there is some stained glass extant from the company's previous building. The 1970s additions are excluded from the listing.
