= Grade II* listed buildings in the City of London =

There are over 20,000 Grade II* listed buildings in England. This page is a list of these buildings in the City of London.

== Buildings ==
=== Churches ===
Name	Location	Type	Completed (Note: The date given is the date used by Historic England as significant for the initial building or that of an important part in the structure's description.)	Date designated	Grid ref. (Note: The grid reference is based on the British national grid reference system, sometimes known as OSGB36, used by the Ordnance Survey.) Geo-coordinates	Entry number (Note: The "List Entry Number" is a unique number assigned to each listed building and scheduled monument by Historic England.)	Image
Church of St Bartholomew the Less, St Bartholomew's Hospital	City and County of the City of London	Church	Earlier	4 January 1950	TQ3188281600; 51°31′05″N 0°06′02″W	1180946	Church of St Bartholomew the Less, St Bartholomew's Hospital More images
Church of St Botolph	City and County of the City of London	Church	1725-9	4 January 1950	TQ3320681500; 51°31′00″N 0°04′54″W	1064747	Church of St Botolph More images
Tower of Former Church of St Albans	City and County of the City of London	Church	1682-7	4 January 1950	TQ3234081465; 51°31′00″N 0°05′39″W	1079120	Tower of Former Church of St Albans More images

=== Livery company halls ===
Name	Location	Type	Completed	Date designated	Grid ref. Geo-coordinates	Entry number	Image
Armourers and Braziers Hall	City and County of the City of London	Livery Hall	1840	4 January 1950	TQ3266381538; 51°31′02″N 0°05′22″W	1192163	Armourers and Braziers Hall More images
Drapers' Hall	City and County of the City of London	Livery Hall	19th century	5 June 1972	TQ3287981295; 51°30′54″N 0°05′11″W	1358902	Drapers' Hall More images
Dyers' Hall	City and County of the City of London	Livery Hall	Mid-late 19th century	4 January 1950	TQ3254880846; 51°30′40″N 0°05′29″W	1359153	Dyers' Hall More images
Fishmongers' Hall	City and County of the City of London	Livery Hall	1831-4	5 June 1972	TQ3280680671; 51°30′34″N 0°05′16″W	1359203	Fishmongers' Hall More images
Innholders Hall	City and County of the City of London	Livery Hall	1670	4 January 1950	TQ3252680830; 51°30′39″N 0°05′30″W	1064708	Innholders Hall More images
Merchant Taylors' Hall	City and County of the City of London	Kitchen	Early 15th century	5 June 1972	TQ3297481188; 51°30′50″N 0°05′06″W	1358898	Merchant Taylors' Hall More images
Tallow Chandlers' Hall	City and County of the City of London	Courtyard	1671-2	4 January 1950	TQ3254580890; 51°30′41″N 0°05′29″W	1064685	Tallow Chandlers' Hall More images
Watermen's Hall	City and County of the City of London	Livery Hall	1778–80	4 January 1950	TQ3306780691; 51°30′34″N 0°05′02″W	1285652	Watermen's Hall More images

=== Other ===
Name	Location	Type	Completed	Date designated	Grid ref. Geo-coordinates	Entry number	Image
2 Wardrobe Place	City and County of the City of London	House	c. 1680	5 June 1972	TQ3187381039; 51°30′46″N 0°06′04″W	1180808	2 Wardrobe Place
Bishopsgate Institute and Library	City and County of the City of London	Institute	1894	16 July 1964	TQ3340681729; 51°31′07″N 0°04′43″W	1191674	Bishopsgate Institute and Library More images
Bracken House	City and County of the City of London	Office	Mid-20th century	13 August 1987	TQ3220380992; 51°30′45″N 0°05′47″W	1262582	Bracken House More images
Buttery at Inner Temple Hall	Inner Temple, City and County of the City of London	Buttery	14th century	4 January 1950	TQ3122981010; 51°30′46″N 0°06′37″W	1359174	Buttery at Inner Temple Hall More images
Central Criminal Court	City and County of the City of London	Court House	1900–07	28 February 1970	TQ3180881329; 51°30′56″N 0°06′07″W	1359218	Central Criminal Court More images
Chapter House of St Paul's Cathedral	City and County of the City of London	Chapter House	1712	4 January 1950	TQ3200381200; 51°30′52″N 0°05′57″W	1358896	Chapter House of St Paul's Cathedral More images
City of London Club	City and County of the City of London	Clubhouse	1833–1834	1 February 1974	TQ3300081297; 51°30′54″N 0°05′05″W	1064593	City of London Club More images
Crescent House Including Ground Floor Shops and Shakespeare Public House	Golden Lane Estate, City and County of the City of London	Flats	1958–1962	4 December 1997	TQ3210282099; 51°31′21″N 0°05′50″W	1021941	Crescent House Including Ground Floor Shops and Shakespeare Public House More images
East Building of Central Market	City and County of the City of London	Meat Market	1868	5 June 1972	TQ3187881780; 51°31′10″N 0°06′02″W	1285241	East Building of Central Market More images
Footings of Destroyed Cloister and Chapter House	City and County of the City of London	Chapter House	14th century	5 June 1972	TQ3201681104; 51°30′48″N 0°05′56″W	1358873	Footings of Destroyed Cloister and Chapter House More images
Former Glyn Mills Bank (1 Fleet Street)	City and County of the City of London	Bank (financial)	1879	26 January 1970	TQ3112281094; 51°30′49″N 0°06′42″W	1064692	Former Glyn Mills Bank (1 Fleet Street) More images
Former Guildhall Library and Museum	City and County of the City of London	Warehouse	c. 1960	10 November 1977	TQ3252981387; 51°30′57″N 0°05′29″W	1064744	Former Guildhall Library and Museum More images
Former Offices of the Bridewell Hospital	City and County of the City of London	Street Lamp	c. 1805	4 January 1950	TQ3162881042; 51°30′47″N 0°06′16″W	1359214	Former Offices of the Bridewell Hospital More images
Former Port of London Authority Building	City and County of the City of London	Hotel	1912–1922	3 March 1972	TQ3345280797; 51°30′37″N 0°04′42″W	1079138	Former Port of London Authority Building More images
Gatehouse to Church of St Bartholomew the Great	City and County of the City of London	Gatehouse	13th century	4 January 1950	TQ3191281666; 51°31′07″N 0°06′01″W	1358892	Gatehouse to Church of St Bartholomew the Great More images
Gateway with Adjoining Wall and Railing to Yard of Church of St Olave	City and County of the City of London	Gate	1658	5 June 1972	TQ3338380837; 51°30′39″N 0°04′46″W	1064636	Gateway with Adjoining Wall and Railing to Yard of Church of St Olave More images
Hoare's Bank	City and County of the City of London	Courtyard	1820–30	16 July 1954	TQ3125881129; 51°30′50″N 0°06′35″W	1192633	Hoare's Bank More images
Holland House, Bury Street	City and County of the City of London	Office	1914	5 June 1972	TQ3336081219; 51°30′51″N 0°04′46″W	1064724	Holland House, Bury Street More images
Hoop and Grapes Public House	Aldgate High Street	Public House	Late 17th century	4 January 1950	TQ3373081234; 51°30′51″N 0°04′27″W	1064735	Hoop and Grapes Public House More images
Inner Temple Gatehouse	City and County of the City of London	Shop	Modern	4 January 1950	TQ3118181113; 51°30′49″N 0°06′39″W	1064693	Inner Temple Gatehouse More images
Chartered Accountants' Hall, Institute of Chartered Accountants	City and County of the City of London	Professional Institute	1889	4 January 1950	TQ3275181447; 51°30′59″N 0°05′18″W	1064586	Chartered Accountants' Hall, Institute of Chartered Accountants More images
King Edwards Buildings (post Office)	King Edward Street, EC2	Post Office	1907–11	6 August 1974	TQ3200981425; 51°30′59″N 0°05′56″W	1286242	King Edwards Buildings (post Office) More images
King Edwards Buildings Post Office	106–113 Newgate Street, EC2	Post Office	1907–11	6 August 1974	TQ3189381388; 51°30′58″N 0°06′02″W	1194097	King Edwards Buildings Post Office More images
Leadenhall Market with Subsidiary Numbering	City and County of the City of London	Livestock Market	1881	5 June 1972	TQ3308681060; 51°30′46″N 0°05′01″W	1286182	Leadenhall Market with Subsidiary Numbering More images
Lloyd's Register	City and County of the City of London	Commercial Office	1900	5 June 1972	TQ3341981029; 51°30′45″N 0°04′43″W	1192466	Lloyd's Register More images
London Stone with Stone Surround and Iron Grille Set into Base of Number 111	City and County of the City of London	Grille	19th century	5 June 1972	TQ3267580909; 51°30′42″N 0°05′22″W	1286846	London Stone with Stone Surround and Iron Grille Set into Base of Number 111 More images
Lutyens House	City and County of the City of London	Underground Railway Station	1924-7	4 January 1950	TQ3279881667; 51°31′06″N 0°05′15″W	1064691	Lutyens House More images
Mercer's School Hall and Buildings Adjoining Mercer's School Hall	City and County of the City of London	School Hall	Late 14th century	4 January 1950	TQ3124481527; 51°31′03″N 0°06′36″W	1064743	Mercer's School Hall and Buildings Adjoining Mercer's School Hall More images
National Westminster Bank Including Lothbury Gallery	City and County of the City of London	Art Gallery	1988	10 November 1977	TQ3277181283; 51°30′54″N 0°05′17″W	1079136	National Westminster Bank Including Lothbury Gallery More images
Number 10 and Attached Railings Number 25 and Attached Railings	City and County of the City of London	Fireproof Building	1897–1902	27 April 1989	TQ3115781506; 51°31′02″N 0°06′40″W	1246854	Number 10 and Attached Railings Number 25 and Attached Railings More images
15 Took's Court	City of London, EC4	Terraced House	c. 1720	24 October 1951	TQ3116181451; 51°31′00″N 0°06′40″W	1244733	15 Took's Court More images
Number 19 and Cellar in Sub Basement	City and County of the City of London	Town House	Late 18th century	19 May 1983	TQ3270780944; 51°30′43″N 0°05′20″W	1079099	Number 19 and Cellar in Sub Basement More images
Pair of Gatepiers Attached to Number 1	City and County of the City of London	Gate Pier	Late 17th century	5 June 1972	TQ3185581215; 51°30′52″N 0°06′04″W	1064739	Pair of Gatepiers Attached to Number 1 More images
Partner's House, Whitbread's Brewery and Attached Railings	City and County of the City of London	House	Early 18th century	29 December 1950	TQ3247581946; 51°31′15″N 0°05′31″W	1262268	Partner's House, Whitbread's Brewery and Attached Railings
Port of London Authority Building (that Part Within London Borough of Tower Hamlets)	City and County of the City of London	Office	1912 To 1922	3 March 1972	TQ3347480778; 51°30′37″N 0°04′41″W	1357519	Port of London Authority Building (that Part Within London Borough of Tower Hamlets) More images
Public Record Office	City and County of the City of London	Office	1851–66	9 January 1970	TQ3121381287; 51°30′55″N 0°06′37″W	1359155	Public Record Office More images
Rear Wing of Middle Temple Gatehouse	Middle Temple, City and County of the City of London	Inns of Court	Late 18th century	5 June 1972	TQ3113881095; 51°30′49″N 0°06′42″W	1285975	Rear Wing of Middle Temple Gatehouse More images
Screen Wall and Colonnade, St Bartholomew's Hospital	City and County of the City of London	Grille	18th century	5 June 1972	TQ3187481615; 51°31′05″N 0°06′03″W	1358893	Screen Wall and Colonnade, St Bartholomew's Hospital
St Paul's Cathedral Choir School	City and County of the City of London	School	2007	3 January 2007	TQ3217881114; 51°30′49″N 0°05′48″W	1391842	St Paul's Cathedral Choir School More images
The Aldgate School	City and County of the City of London	Statue	1908	5 June 1972	TQ3351381180; 51°30′50″N 0°04′38″W	1285969	The Aldgate School More images
The Black Friar Public House	City and County of the City of London	Inn Sign	c. 1875	5 June 1972	TQ3168480948; 51°30′44″N 0°06′14″W	1285723	The Black Friar Public House More images
The Daily Express Building	City and County of the City of London	Newspaper Office	1932	15 March 1972	TQ3154381201; 51°30′52″N 0°06′20″W	1064659	The Daily Express Building More images
Wood Street Police Station	City and County of the City of London	Apartment	1963–1966	24 April 1998	TQ3236381471; 51°31′00″N 0°05′38″W	1323699	Wood Street Police Station More images
1–3 Amen Court	City and County of the City of London	Row	Late 17th century	4 January 1950	TQ3184181222; 51°30′52″N 0°06′05″W	1064737	1–3 Amen Court More images
41 & 42 Cloth Fair	City and County of the City of London	House	Early 17th century	4 January 1950	TQ3192081715; 51°31′08″N 0°06′00″W	1064703	41 & 42 Cloth Fair More images
3 Middle Temple Lane	Middle Temple, City and County of the City of London	Inns of Court	Late 17th century	4 January 1950	TQ3115181082; 51°30′48″N 0°06′41″W	1064615	3 Middle Temple Lane
42 Crutched Friars	City and County of the City of London	House	Early 18th century	4 January 1950	TQ3343080903; 51°30′41″N 0°04′43″W	1064677	42 Crutched Friars
15–22 Cornhill; 71–77 Lombard Street	City and County of the City of London	Bank	Altered 1949	10 November 1977	TQ3280081095; 51°30′47″N 0°05′15″W	1064709	15–22 Cornhill; 71–77 Lombard Street More images
The City and County of London Troops War Memorial	Cornhill	War Memorial	1920	5 June 1972	TQ3276781132; 51°30′49″N 0°05′17″W	1064714	The City and County of London Troops War Memorial More images
20 St Swithen's Lane	City and County of the City of London	House	Pre 1767	5 June 1980	TQ3271880940; 51°30′43″N 0°05′20″W	1079092	20 St Swithen's Lane More images
27 & 28 Queen Street	City and County of the City of London	House	Mid 18th century	4 January 1950	TQ3242880951; 51°30′43″N 0°05′35″W	1079139	27 & 28 Queen Street More images
8 Kings Bench Walk	Inner Temple, City and County of the City of London	Inns of Court	Early 18th century	4 January 1950	TQ3135280960; 51°30′44″N 0°06′31″W	1193194	8 Kings Bench Walk
7 Lothbury	City and County of the City of London	Commercial Office	1866	16 July 1964	TQ3273081275; 51°30′53″N 0°05′19″W	1193583	7 Lothbury More images
4 Essex Court	Middle Temple, City and County of the City of London	Inns of Court	Early 18th century	5 June 1972	TQ3109581028; 51°30′47″N 0°06′44″W	1193758	4 Essex Court More images
3 North, Kings Bench Walk	Inner Temple, City and County of the City of London	House	Early 19th century	4 January 1950	TQ3133181053; 51°30′47″N 0°06′32″W	1359176	3 North, Kings Bench Walk More images
1 & 2 Laurence Pountney Hill	City and County of the City of London	House	1703	4 January 1950	TQ3271280838; 51°30′39″N 0°05′20″W	1359204	1 & 2 Laurence Pountney Hill More images
33 & 35 Eastcheap	City and County of the City of London	Office	1868	5 March 1971	TQ3307480834; 51°30′39″N 0°05′02″W	1359154	33 & 35 Eastcheap More images
51–53 Threadneedle Street; 9 Old Broad Street	City and County of the City of London	Bank (financial)	1922–36	8 January 1971	TQ3294081234; 51°30′52″N 0°05′08″W	1358901	51–53 Threadneedle Street; 9 Old Broad Street More images
12 Tokenhouse Yard	City and County of the City of London	Bank (financial)	Dated 1872	10 November 1977	TQ3275581358; 51°30′56″N 0°05′17″W	1358903	12 Tokenhouse Yard More images
46 Aldgate High Street	City and County of the City of London	House	Late 17th century	4 January 1950	TQ3373581237; 51°30′51″N 0°04′27″W	1359144	46 Aldgate High Street
22A College Hill	City and County of the City of London	House	c. 1680	4 January 1950	TQ3251180885; 51°30′41″N 0°05′31″W	1359164	22A College Hill More images
13 & 15 Moorgate	City and County of the City of London	Commercial Office	1890–1893	5 June 1972	TQ3265281347; 51°30′56″N 0°05′23″W	1359212	13 & 15 Moorgate More images
60 & 61 Mark Lane	City and County of the City of London	Office	1864	5 June 1972	TQ3333180840; 51°30′39″N 0°04′48″W	1359196	60 & 61 Mark Lane
22 College Hill	City and County of the City of London	Gate	c. 1680	4 January 1950	TQ3249480902; 51°30′41″N 0°05′32″W	1064707	22 College Hill More images
2 Middle Temple Lane	Middle Temple, City and County of the City of London	Inns of Court	Late 17th century	4 January 1950	TQ3114581097; 51°30′49″N 0°06′41″W	1285986	2 Middle Temple Lane
337 & 338 High Holborn	City and County of the City of London	House	c. 1586	14 May 1974	TQ3114181588; 51°31′05″N 0°06′41″W	1246102	337 & 338 High Holborn More images
No 1 Poultry	1 Poultry, London, EC2R 8EJ	Office and retail building	1998	28 November 2016	TQ3256981105; 51°30′48″N 0°05′27″W	1428881	No 1 Poultry More images
St Michael Cornhill War Memorial	St Michael's Alley, Cornhill, City of London, EC3V 3ND	War memorial	1920	1 December 2016	TQ3293681110; 51°30′48″N 0°05′08″W	1439646	St Michael Cornhill War Memorial More images
National Submarine War Memorial	Victoria Embankment, City of London, EC4Y 0HJ	War memorial	1922	5 June 1972	TQ3118380797; 51°30′39″N 0°06′40″W	1079109	National Submarine War Memorial More images
Royal Fusiliers War Memorial	High Holborn, Holborn, London, EC1N 2LL	War memorial	1922	5 June 1972	TQ3117581601; 51°31′05″N 0°06′39″W	1064638	Royal Fusiliers War Memorial More images

== See also ==
- Grade I listed buildings in the City of London
