= St Sarkis Church, London =

St Sarkis Church
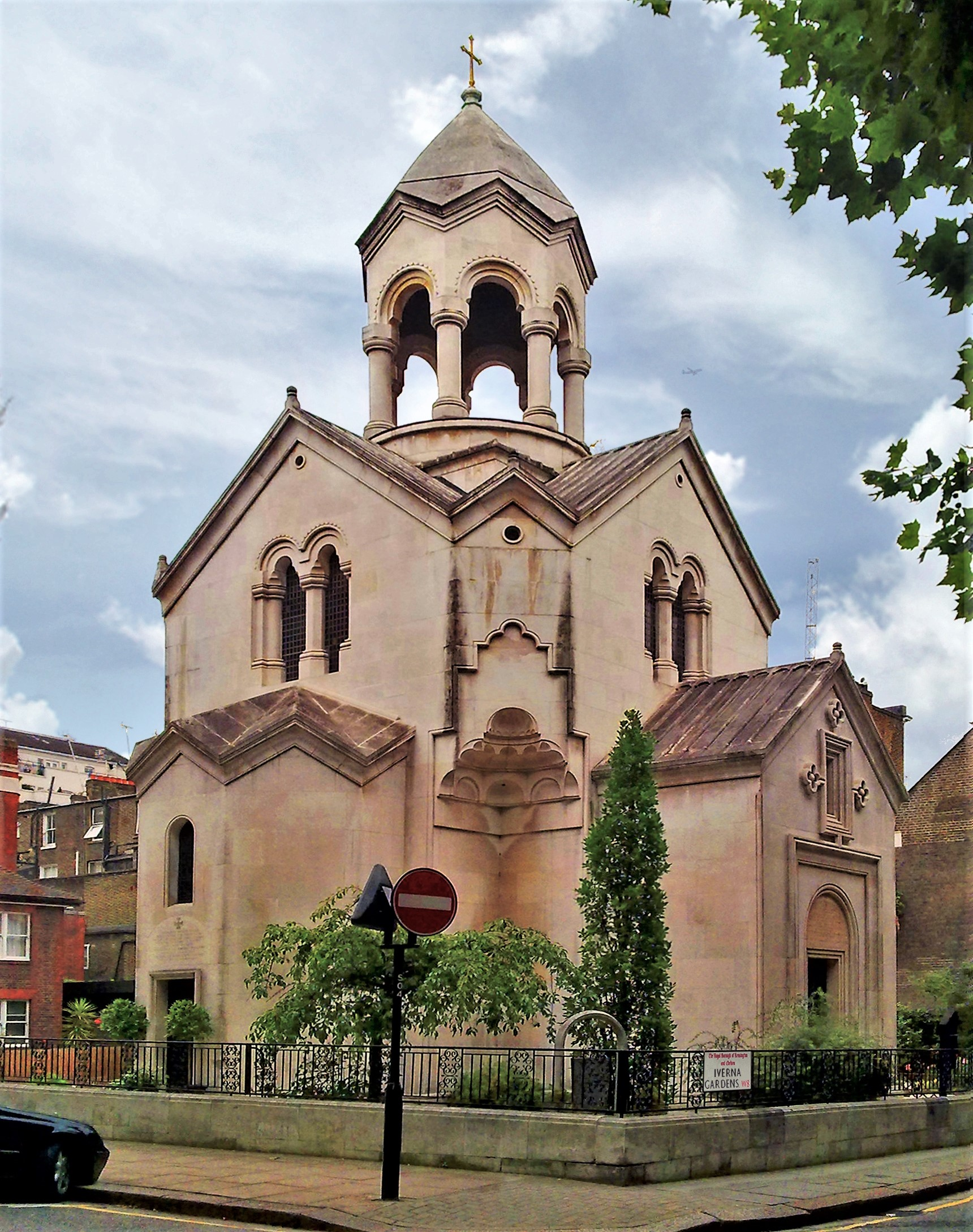
- St Sarkis Church
- 51°29′59″N 0°11′37″W
- Location: Iverna Gardens, Kensington, London
- Country: England
- Denomination: Armenian Apostolic Church
- Website: stsarkislondon.org

Architecture
- Architect: Arthur Davis
- Years built: 1922–1923

Administration
- Diocese: Diocese of the Armenian Church of Great Britain

St Sarkis Church (Armenian: Սուրբ Սարգիս եկեղեցի) is an Armenian Apostolic church and a Grade II* listed building in Iverna Gardens, Kensington, London. It was constructed in 1922–1923 by Calouste Gulbenkian as a memorial to his parents, and the architect was Arthur Davis. It is the only church in England to have been built in the traditional Armenian style. Its design is inspired by the 13th-century freestanding bell tower of Haghpat Monastery. It is the seat of the Diocese of the United Kingdom of the Armenian Apostolic Church.

== History ==
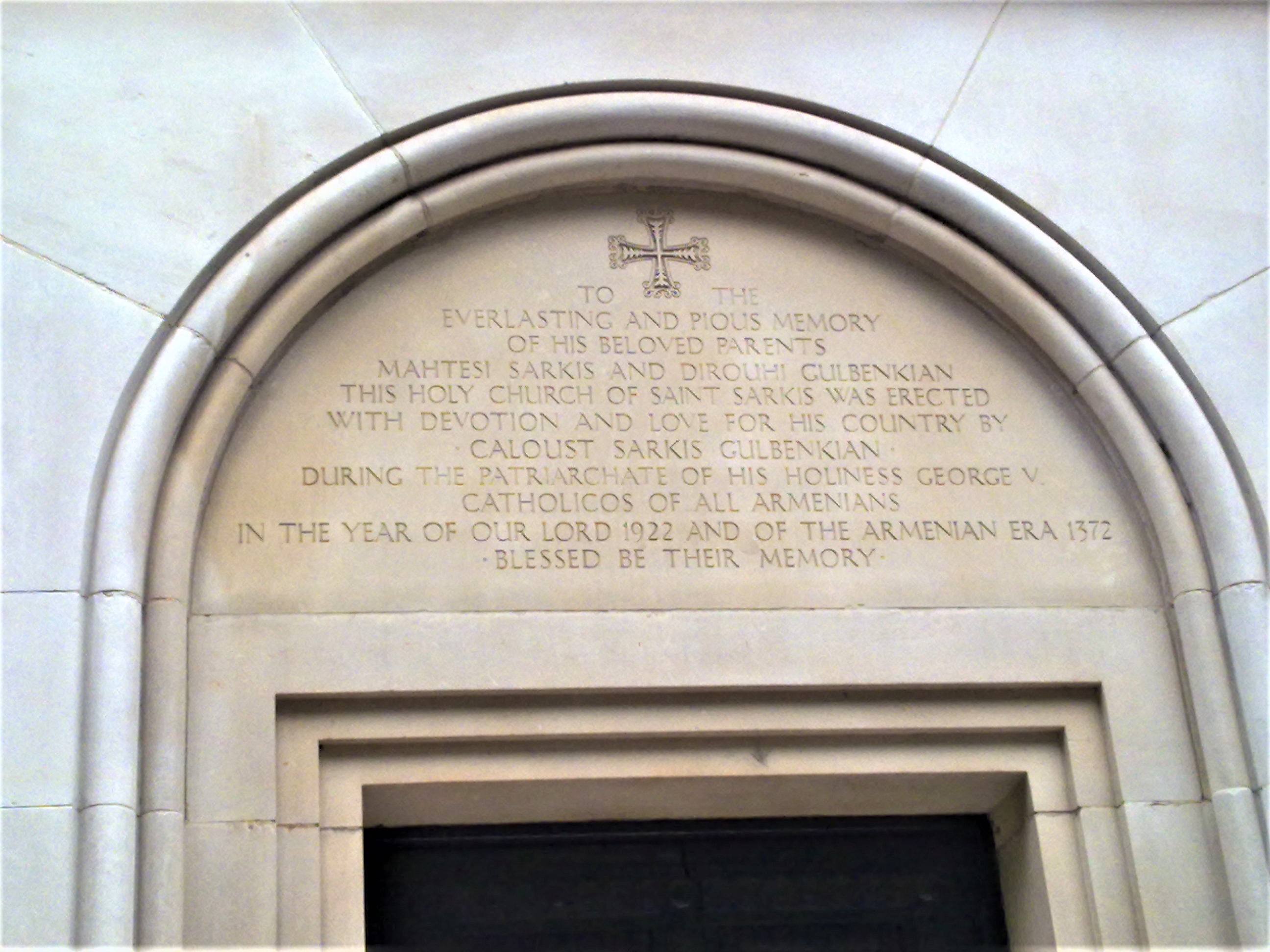
Dedication to Gulbenkian's parents at the entrance of the church.

The construction of the church was funded by Calouste Gulbenkian, an Ottoman-born Armenian oil magnate. He agreed to finance it with the precondition to dedicate it to his parents, Sarkis and Takouhi. Besides being his father's name, Sarkis is also the name of one of Armenia's most celebrated saints—Saint Sarkis the Warrior. The church was designed by Arthur Joseph Davis and built by Holloway Brothers. Its construction began in February 1922 and it was consecrated on 11 January 1923. The church was expanded twice; first in 1937 a baptistery was added to the north side along with a new entrance, and, in 1950, a sacristy was added in the south-east side of the church.

Catholicos Vazgen I visited the church in 1978 and 1983.

== Architecture ==
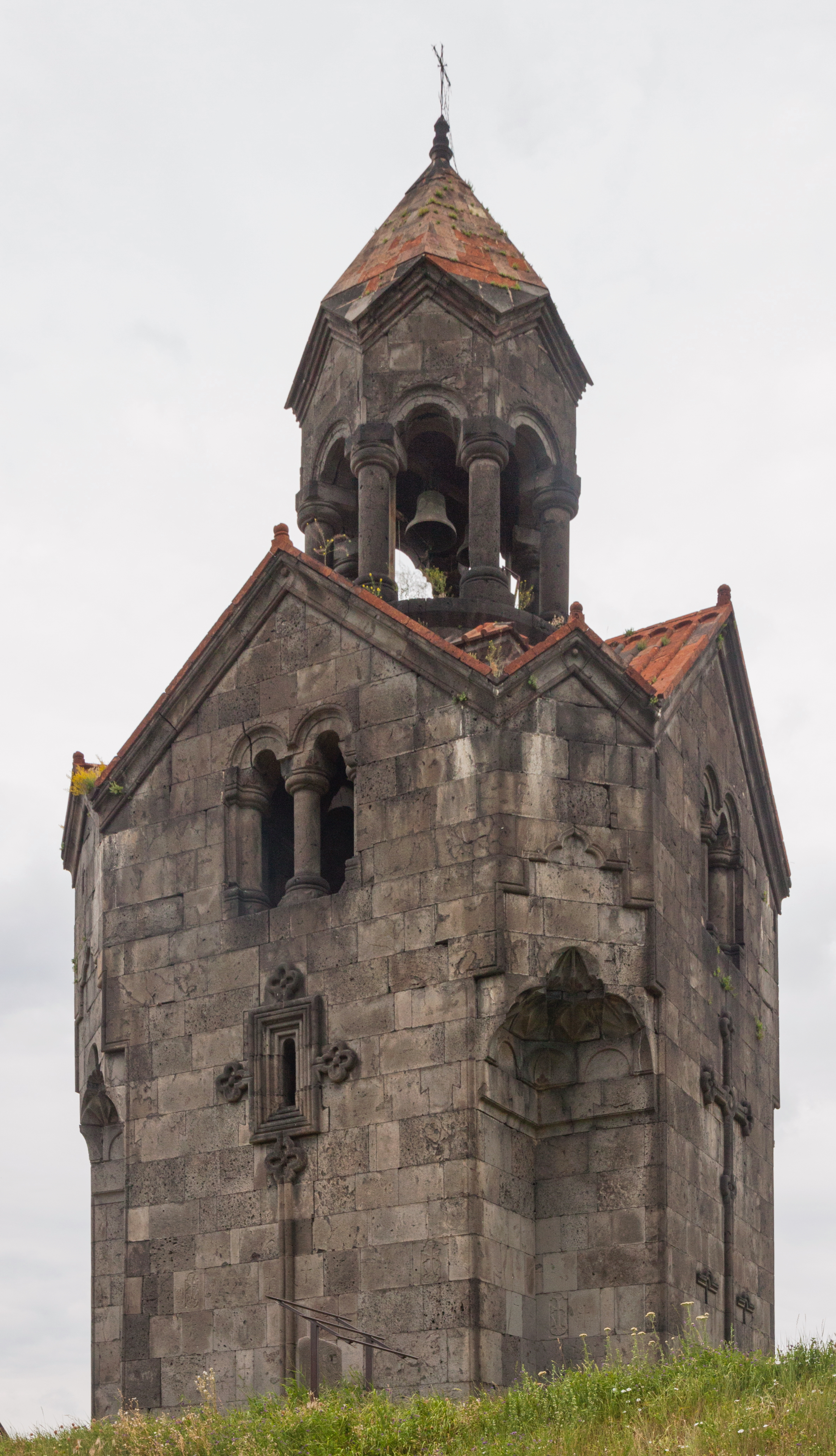
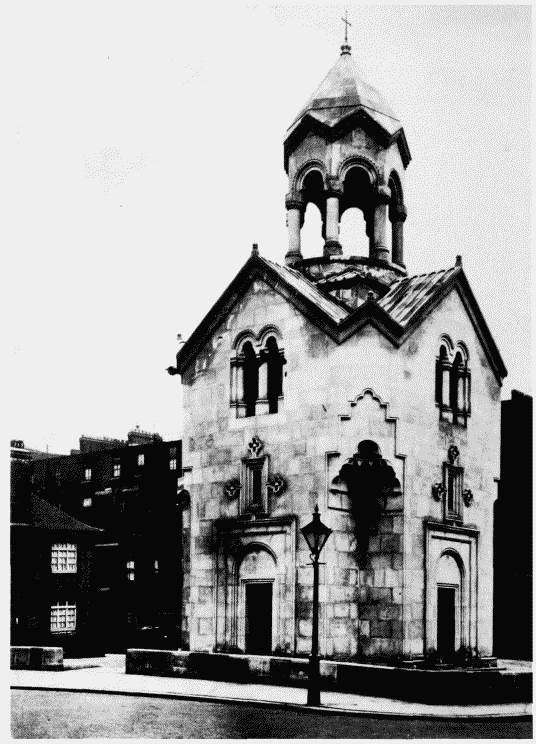
The bell tower of Haghpat and St Sarkis in its original state (1924 photo).

The church follows traditional Armenian church architecture. It is modelled after the freestanding bell tower of Haghpat Monastery, built in 1245. The exterior, similar to the Haghpat bell tower, has three stages/levels. The church has been described as an "exotic eastern edifice" by The Economist. It was built in Portland stone and has a Greek cross plan. The entrance has an English inscription recording its dedication to Gulbenkian's parents "in the Armenian Era 1372". The altarpiece contains a painting of Virgin and Child with gilded relief carving of angels in the gable made by the Bromsgrove Guild of Applied Arts. There are also sculptures of Gulbenkian family members inside the church.

== Heritage designation ==
The church was listed as a Grade II* building on 16 January 1981, which classified it as a "particularly important building of more than special interest."
