= National Westminster Bank, London =

Office building in London, England

National Westminster Bank
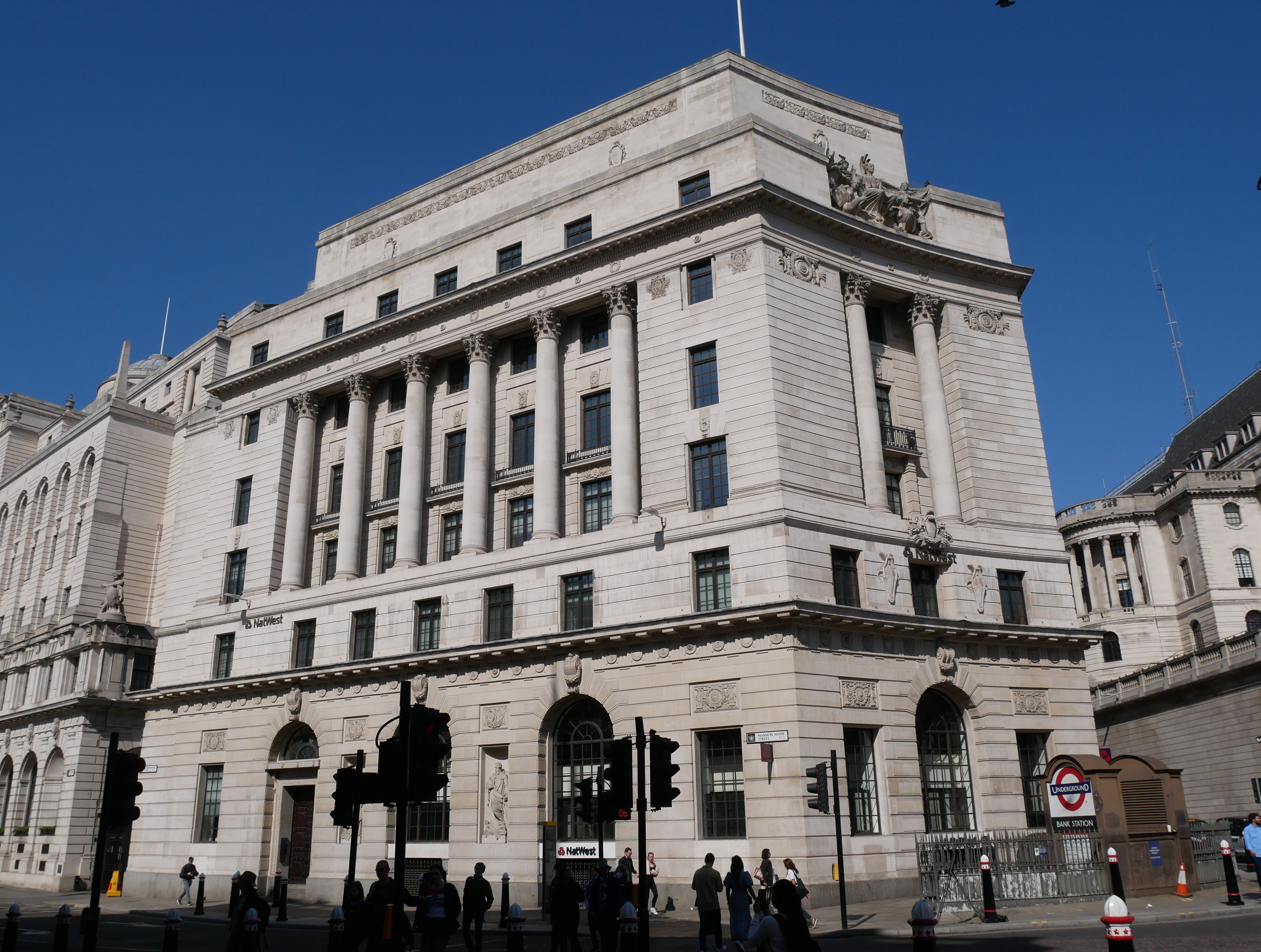
- Interactive map of the National Westminster Bank area

General information
- Type: Office, former bank
- Architectural style: Baroque
- Location: London, England
- Coordinates: 51°30′49″N 0°05′22″W
- Completed: 1932

Design and construction
- Architect: Edwin Cooper

Listed Building – Grade II
- Official name: National Westminster Bank
- Designated: 10 November 1977
- Reference no.: 1064599

The National Westminster Bank at 1 Prince's Street is a Grade II listed office block that stands on Prince's Street overlooking Bank Junction in the City of London.

== History ==
The building was built between 1929 and 1932 for the National Provincial Bank, whose later 1970 merger with the National Westminster Bank gives it its commonly used modern name. Built around the same time as the new Bank of England across Bank Junction, the new building usefully provided office space nearby, but the bank's headquarters remained in Bishopsgate.

Between 1994 and 1997, T. P. Bennett carried out redevelopment of the building, retaining its historic facade as well as the banking hall. In 2025, Zedwell announced plans to transform the building into a budget hotel.

== Design ==
The designs were provided by Sir Edwin Cooper, an eminent architect in the City of London in the early 20th-century. According to Philip-Ward Jackson he would become known as "the man who had designed more buildings in the City of London than any architect since Sir Christopher Wren". Having completed the 1922 Port of London Authority headquarters and 1928 Lloyd's Building, the National Westminster Bank building was relatively restrained in comparison.

The building occupies a triangular plot, contained by Lutyen's Midland Bank Building with the face overlooking Bank Junction slightly convex. This side's parapet hosts an allegorical group by Ernest Gillick. Depicted in the centre is Britannia, flanked by Mercury representing commerce, Truth, Higher Mathematics and Lower Mathematics. The other sides have niche sculptures of Courage, Integrity, Security and Prosperity by Charles Doman.

== See also ==
- Midland Bank, Poultry
- Westminster Bank Building
- Gibson Hall, London
