= William Butler (physician) =

English physician (1535–1618)

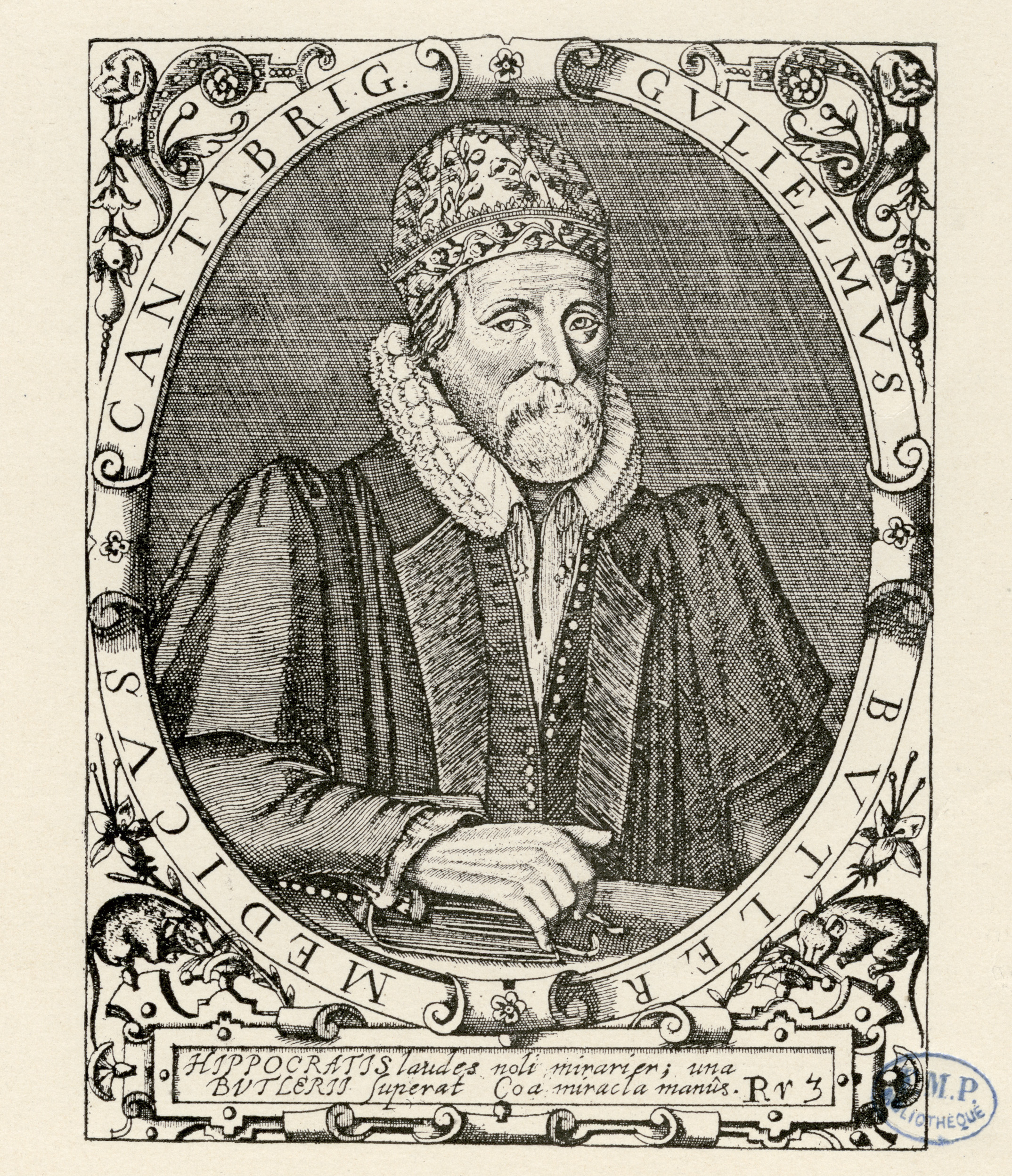

William Butler (1535–29 January 1618) was an English academic and physician. A Fellow of Clare College, Cambridge, he gained a reputation as an eccentric, a drunkard, and "the greatest physician of his time".

== Life ==
Butler was born at Ipswich in Suffolk and matriculated as a sizar at Peterhouse, Cambridge, in 1558 (BA 1561, MA 1564). In 1572 he was elected a Fellow of Clare Hall, Cambridge (later Clare College), and granted a licence to practise physic by the university. According to the 17th-century antiquary John Aubrey, he lived at an apothecary's shop at Cambridge with a servant, an "old mayd" named Nell whose job it was to fetch him home each night from a tavern.

He first came to notice, Aubrey writes, in 1603 when he revived a local clergyman from an opium-induced coma by the unorthodox method of slaughtering a cow and placing the senseless parson inside the "cowes warme belly". Although he had no medical degree, Butler was appointed a court physician by King James VI and I and attended the King's eldest son Henry Frederick, Prince of Wales, during his fatal illness of November 1612. Butler is believed to have been neither a Galenist nor a Paracelsian, but rather an "empiric" physician, who based his treatments not on any theory but purely on reasoning and experience. He opposed the common practice of blood-letting (phlebotomy or venesection) and the then novel use of dangerous chemical remedies. Some of Butler's papers are preserved at Clare College and show that he sometimes gave medical advice by letter. One begins with a reference to King Henry VIII:

"Moste honest and righte honorable Thomas, in the time of Graunde Harrye that vaste and Rumbleduste Gyaunte, that had better skill of a Butcher’s axe, then of a secretaries penne, (though he once confuted Luther) it fortuned that a Laureate poëte of his Courte fell Sike and departed his life." Another begins with a reference to a patient's drinking habits: "My lord, potton & Reelingworthe towne are not farre a sondere. The nearest way ys by tipplestall Grannge, whyche will brynge yowe to staggerington, and so to downfall in the vale."

Butler is credited with inventing a medicinal drink, Dr Butler’s purging ale, that was popular in 17th-century England. Shortly before his death he bequeathed £260 to Clare College for the purchase of "finest gold," from which a chalice and a paten were made.

According to a contemporary inscription on an engraved portrait titled "Guilielmus Butler Cantabrig. Huius Aetatis Princeps Medicorum. Anno 1620", Butler died in 1617 at the age of 83. The epitaph below it reads:

When now the Fates ’gan wonder that their thrids
Were so oft tied againe, halfe cut i’ th’ mids,
And Charon wanting his us’d Naulum sware,
He now a days did want of many a fare.
They all conspire, and found, at last, that it
Was skillfull Butler, who mens lives could knit.
All most untried, they kill’d him, and yet fear’d
That he from death by death would ghosts have rear’d.

Butler is buried in the chancel of the Church of St Mary the Great, Cambridge, where he has a monument and a Latin funerary plaque. He also has a pub sign in the City of London, The Old Doctor Butler's Head.
