= Interlocking machine room =

Component of the London Underground signalling system

An Interlocking machine room (IMR) is a component of the London Underground signalling system. Interlocking is an arrangement of signal apparatus that prevents conflicting movements through an arrangement of tracks such as junctions or crossings. On the London Underground signals and points are operated and controlled by an array of electrical, pneumatic and mechanical components. IMRs are unmanned and generally located adjacent to points or at platform ends, and provide a secure and weatherproof enclosure for pneumatically controlled mechanically and electrically interlocked levers mounted horizontally in an upright lever-frame or with a converted manual lever frame.

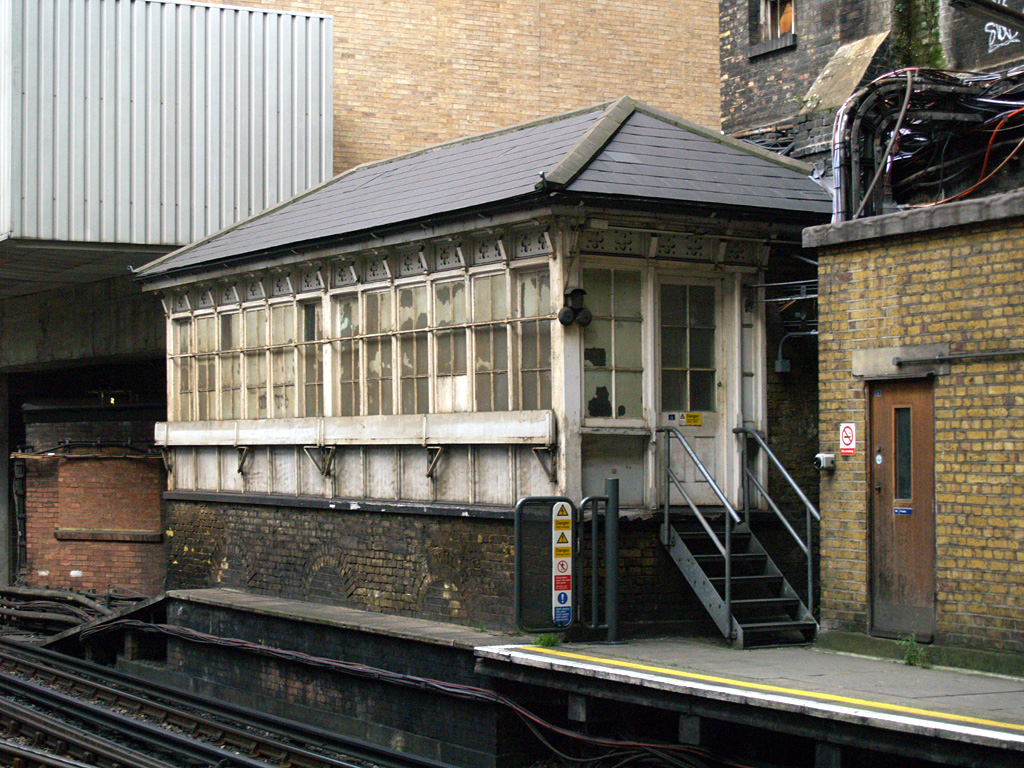
Liverpool Street Interlocking Machine Room

The table below is an alphabetical listing of the extant Interlocking Machine Rooms on the London Underground network in August 2024.

London Underground operational Interlocking machine rooms
IMR Code	IMR name / location	LU Line	Location	Multiple codes controlled
BB	Queen's Park Depot	Bakerloo		
BD	Paddington	Bakerloo	in middle of platform	
BM	Baker Street	Bakerloo		
BP	Piccadilly Circus	Bakerloo		
BR BS	Waterloo	Bakerloo		
JB	Harrow-on-the-Hill North Subsidiary	Metropolitan		
JB	Harrow-on-the-Hill South Subsidiary	Metropolitan		
JF	Northwood	Metropolitan		
JJ	Watford South Junction	Metropolitan		
L	King's Cross	Piccadilly		
MM	Neasden Depot	Metropolitan Jubilee		
JB	Harrow-on-the-Hill	Metropolitan	within manned cabin	JB subsidiaries and JF
JP	Watford	Metropolitan		
JP	Rickmansworth	Metropolitan	within manned cabin	JP, JJ
JT	Chalfont & Latimer	Metropolitan		
JW	Amersham	Metropolitan	within manned cabin	JW, JT
MD	Finchley Road	Metropolitan		was MD JB
MG JG	Wembley Park	Metropolitan		
MP	Rayners Lane	Metropolitan Piccadilly	With manned Cabin	MU, MW
MU	Ruislip Siding	Metropolitan Piccadilly		
MW	Uxbridge Sidings	Metropolitan Piccadilly		
PB	Green Park	Piccadilly	at end of platform	
PD	Holborn	Piccadilly		
PG	Wood Green	Piccadilly	at end of platform	
PJ	Arnos Grove	Piccadilly		
PK	Oakwood	Piccadilly	inside former cabin	
PM	Cockfosters	Piccadilly	inside former cabin	
WD	Hammersmith	District Piccadilly		
WF	Parsons Green East	District		
WF	Parsons Green West	District		
WG	Putney Bridge	District		
WK	Waterloo	Waterloo and City	inside former cabin	
WK	Turnham Green	District Piccadilly		
WL	Acton Town (East)	District		
WL	Acton Town (West)	District		
WM	Ealing Common	District		
WM	Hanger Lane junction	District		
WP	Ealing Broadway	District	inside former cabin	
WR	Northfields Depot	Piccadilly		
WS	Boston Manor	Piccadilly		
WT	Hounslow Central	Piccadilly		
WV	South Harrow	Piccadilly		
WW	Hatton Cross	Piccadilly	at end of platform	
WY	Heathrow Terminals 2 and 3	Piccadilly	at end of platform	
WZ	Heathrow Terminal 5	Piccadilly		

As London Underground train control is modernised and updated some Interlocking Machine Rooms are made redundant. The table below is an alphabetical listing of the IMRs on the London Underground network that were operational in 1994 but had been decommissioned by August 2024.

London Underground decommissioned Interlocking machine rooms
IMR Code	IMR name / location	LU Line	Location	Multiple codes controlled	Decommissioned
AC	Colindale	Northern	at end of platform		2008-19
AE	Edgware	Northern	inside former cabin		2008-19
B	Kennington	Northern			2008-19
B	Shoreditch	East London			2002-08
C	Charing Cross	Northern	inside former cabin		2008-19
CG	White City	Central	within manned cabin	EAB, NOA	1994-2002
E	Camden Town (Platform 1)	Northern			2008-19
E	Camden Town (Platform 4)	Northern			2008-19
EAB	Ealing Broadway	Central			1994-2002
ET	Canal Junction (south of Surrey Quays)	East London	within manned cabin		1994-2002
ET	New Cross Gate	East London			1994-2002
F	Hampstead	Northern	inside former cabin		2008-19
FB	Bromley-by-Bow	District			
FC	Plaistow	District			
FE	East Ham	District			
FF	Barking	District	within manned cabin	FB – FG	
FF	Barking Sidings West	District			
FF	Barking Sidings East	District			
FG	Dagenham East	District			
FJ	Hornchurch	District			
FM	Upminster	District	within manned cabin	FJ – FM	
FM	Upminster West	District			
G	Golders Green South	Northern			2008-19
G	Golders Green North	Northern			2008-19
HON	Holborn	Central			1994-2002
JE	Willesden Green	Metropolitan Jubilee			
JL	Stanmore Sidings	Jubilee			2008-19
JP	Rickmansworth	Metropolitan	within manned cabin	JP, JJ	
LB	Liverpool Street	Central	in manned cabin in middle of platform		1994-2002
LC	Bethnal Green	Central	in manned cabin in middle of platform		1994-2002
LF	Leytonstone	Central	in manned cabin		1994-2002
LJ	Woodford	Central	in manned cabin		1994-2002
LL	Hainault	Central	in manned cabin	Also controlled LL Grange Hill subsidiary area	1994-2002
LP	Newbury Park	Central	in manned cabin		1994-2002
LT	Loughton	Central	in manned cabin		1994-2002
LU	Debden	Central	in manned cabin		1994-2002
LW	Epping	Central	in manned cabin	LW, LX	1994-2002
LX	North Weald	Central	in former manned cabin		1994-2002
M	Moorgate	Northern	inside former cabin		2008-19
MAA	Marble Arch	Central			1994-2002
NN	Archway	Northern	inside former cabin		2008-19
NOA	North Acton	Central			1994-2002
NOR	Northolt	Central	at end of platform		1994-2002
NP	East Finchley	Northern	inside former cabin		2008-19
NQ	Finchley Central	Northern	inside former cabin		2008-19
NU	High Barnet	Northern	inside former cabin		2008-19
OP	Edgware Road	Metropolitan	within manned cabin		2008-19
OZ	Hammersmith	Metropolitan	within manned cabin		2008-19
QUE	Queensway	Central	at end of platform		1994-2002
RUG	Ruislip Gardens	Central			1994-2002
TF	Green Park	Jubilee			2008-19
TG	Charing Cross	Jubilee	at end of platform		2008-19
U	Stockwell	Northern			2008-19
VE	Brixton	Victoria	at end of platform		2008-19
VF	Victoria	Victoria	at end of platform		2008-19
VG	Warren Street	Victoria	at end of platform		2008-19
VH	King's Cross St Pancras	Victoria	at end of platform		2008-19
VJ	Highbury & Islington	Victoria			2008-19
VK	Finsbury Park	Victoria			
VL	Seven Sisters	Victoria			2008-19
VN	Northumberland Park Depot	Victoria			2008-19
VP	Walthamstow Central	Victoria	at end of platform		2008-19
W	Tooting Broadway	Northern	at end of platform		2008-19
WER	West Ruislip	Central	within manned cabin	WER, RUG, NOR	1994-2002
WB	West Kensington East	District Piccadilly	inside former cabin		
WC	West Kensington West	District Piccadilly			
X	Angel	Northern	in former manned cabin at end of platform		1994-2002
Y	Morden	Northern			2008-19
EN	Whitechapel	District	within manned cabin		2021
EC	Earl's Court	District	at end of platform		2022
ED	High Street Kensington	District			2022
ED	Triangle Sidings (Kensington)	District			2022
EE	Gloucester Road	District			2022
EF	South Kensington	District			2022
EG	Mansion House	District			2021
EH	Embankment	District	at street level		2021
EJ	Tower Hill	District	in middle of platform		2021
MB	Baker Street	Metropolitan	under platforms 1 & 2		2019
ML	Swiss Cottage	Metropolitan			2019
OB	Aldgate	District Metropolitan			2021
OD	Liverpool Street	Metropolitan	inside former cabin		2021
OE	Moogate	Metropolitan			2021
OH	Farringdon	Metropolitan			2021
OJ	King's Cross St Pancras	Metropolitan	at end of platform		2021
L	King's Cross	Northern	inside former cabin		
J	Euston	Northern			

== See also ==
- Interlocking
- Liverpool Street signal box
