= Salisbury House, London =

Office building in London, England

Salisbury House
- The Finsbury Circus face of the building
- Interactive map of the Salisbury House area

General information
- Type: Office
- Architectural style: Edwardian Baroque
- Location: London, England
- Coordinates: 51°31′03″N 0°05′15″W
- Completed: 1901

Design and construction
- Architects: Davis & Emmanuel

Listed Building – Grade II
- Official name: Salisbury House
- Designated: 15 August 1997
- Reference no.: 1375270

Salisbury House is a Grade II listed office block that stands on Finsbury Circus, in the City of London.

== History and description ==
The building was built between 1899 and 1901 to designs of Davis & Emmanuel in a grand Edwardian Baroque style. It is built of Bath stone with a slate pavilion roof, employing elements of the English and French Baroque.

The building was a speculative development, the seminal construction of new large office blocks built in Finsbury Circus. These were enabled by the cessation of leases surrounding the gardens and were of a much larger scale than seen for office buildings in London during the Victorian era. Salisbury house was mirrored shortly after by another grand Baroque design to its east in the London Wall Buildings. Both use giant order columns on their facades, completing the entire southern curve of Finsbury Circus. Electra House, the building's neighbour, exemplified the grand Edwardian style employed in the area further with domes and cupolas.

In 2016 the building experienced a gas leak leading the evacuation of the area. In 2026, the owners of the building Workspace Groups Plc considered the sale of the building to Saba Capital with an expected price of around £125 million.

== See also ==
- London Wall Buildings
- Electra House
- Britannic House
- Park House
