= Westminster Bank Building =

Office building in London, England

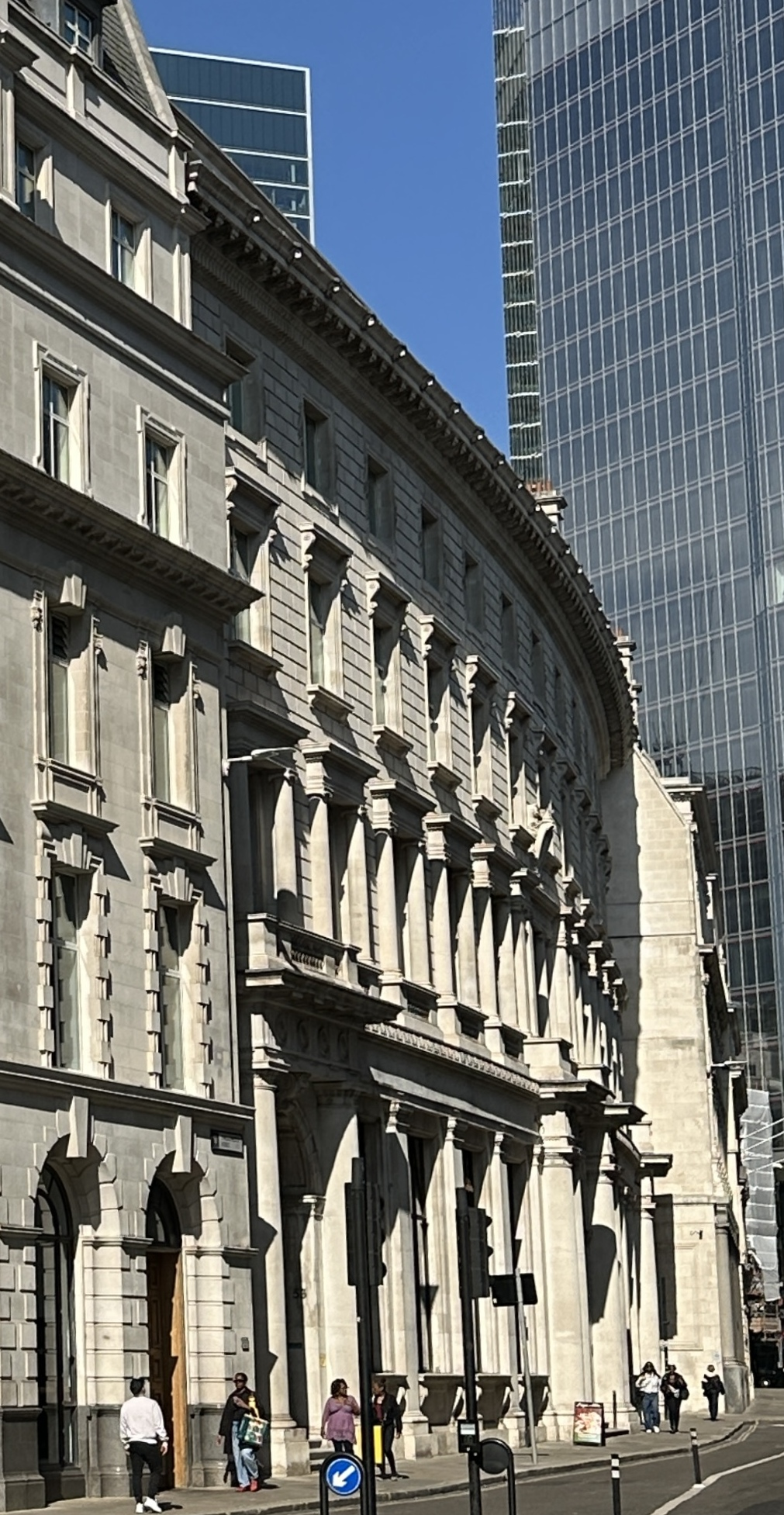
- The Threadneedle Street side of the building

General information
- Type: Office, former bank
- Architectural style: Renaissance
- Location: London, England
- Coordinates: 51°30′53″N 0°05′07″W
- Completed: 1931

Design and construction
- Architects: Mewes and Davis

Listed Building – Grade II*
- Official name: 9, OLD BROAD STREET EC2, 51-53, THREADNEEDLE STREET EC2
- Designated: 08 January 1971
- Reference no.: 1358901

The Westminster Bank Building at Nos. 51–53 Threadneedle Street and 9 Old Broad Street in the City of London is a Grade II* listed office building and former bank.

== History and description ==
The building was built between 1922 and 1931 by architects Charles Mewès and Arthur Joseph Davis for Westminster Bank, and extended in 1936, partly into 1 Threadneedle Street. It stands on a plot formerly occupied by St. Anthony's Hospital, replaced by the Hall of Commerce which was demolished to make way for the Westminster Bank. No. 52 was formerly known as "Lady Tate's House" where the father and grandfather of Sir Philip Sidney lived.

The building has a long convex front of Portland Stone along the Threadneedle Street side. The renaissance style was inspired by Peruzzi's Massimo Palace, as well carvings on Michelangelo's Palazzo Farnese. Davis considered the bank his favourite work, and it this building for which he won the London Street Architecture Medal in 1930. The Old Broad Street side is much shorter, described by Pevsner as their "usual Franco-American idiom", inspired by the Beaux-Arts works of architect Charles Follen McKim.

== See also ==
- 1 Old Broad Street
