= City of London Club =

London gentlemen's club

Coordinates: 51.5150°N 0.0847°W

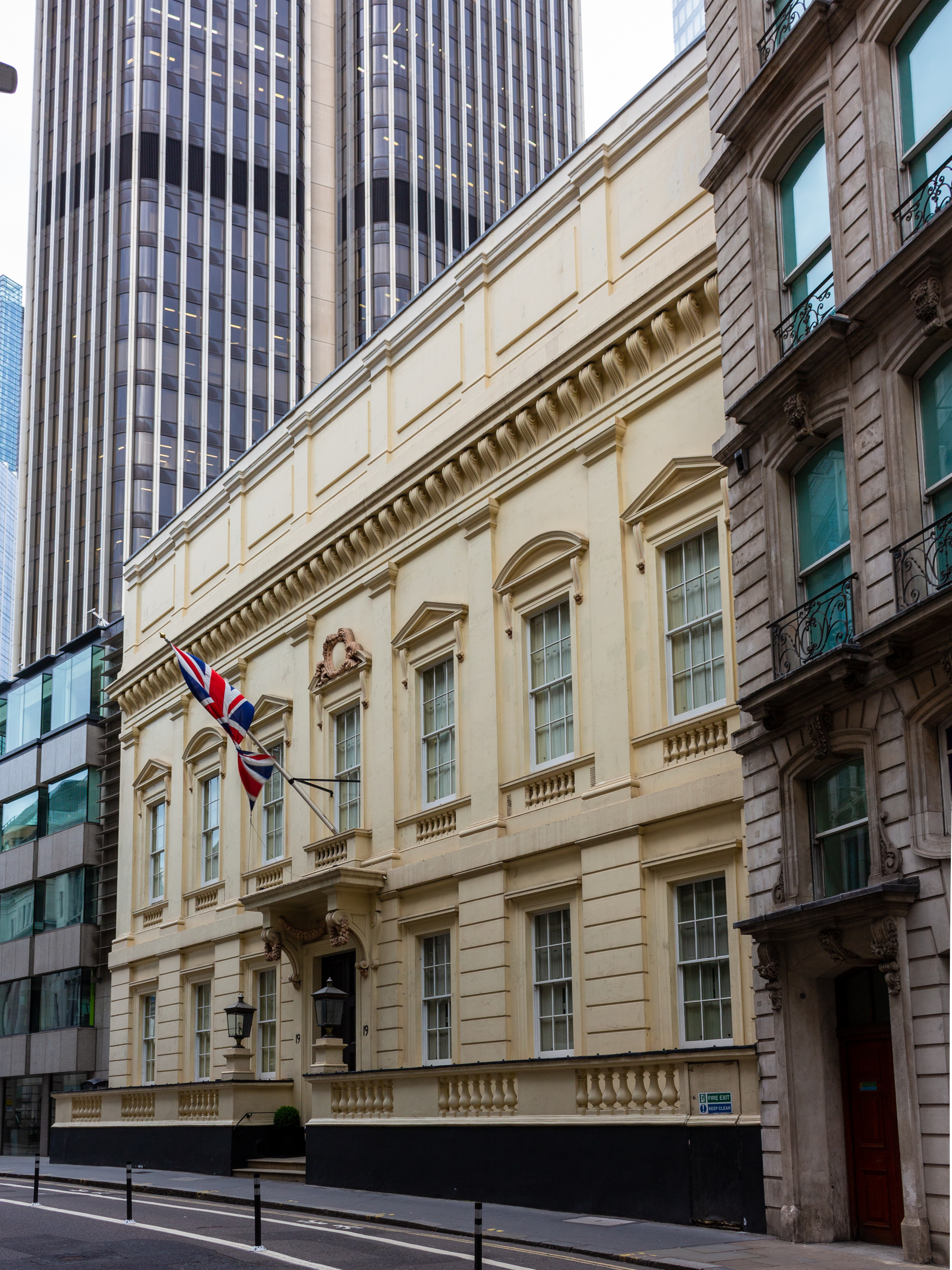
- The City of London Club at 19 Old Broad Street
- Founded: 1832
- Location: Old Broad Street, London, EC2
- Website: cityoflondonclub.com

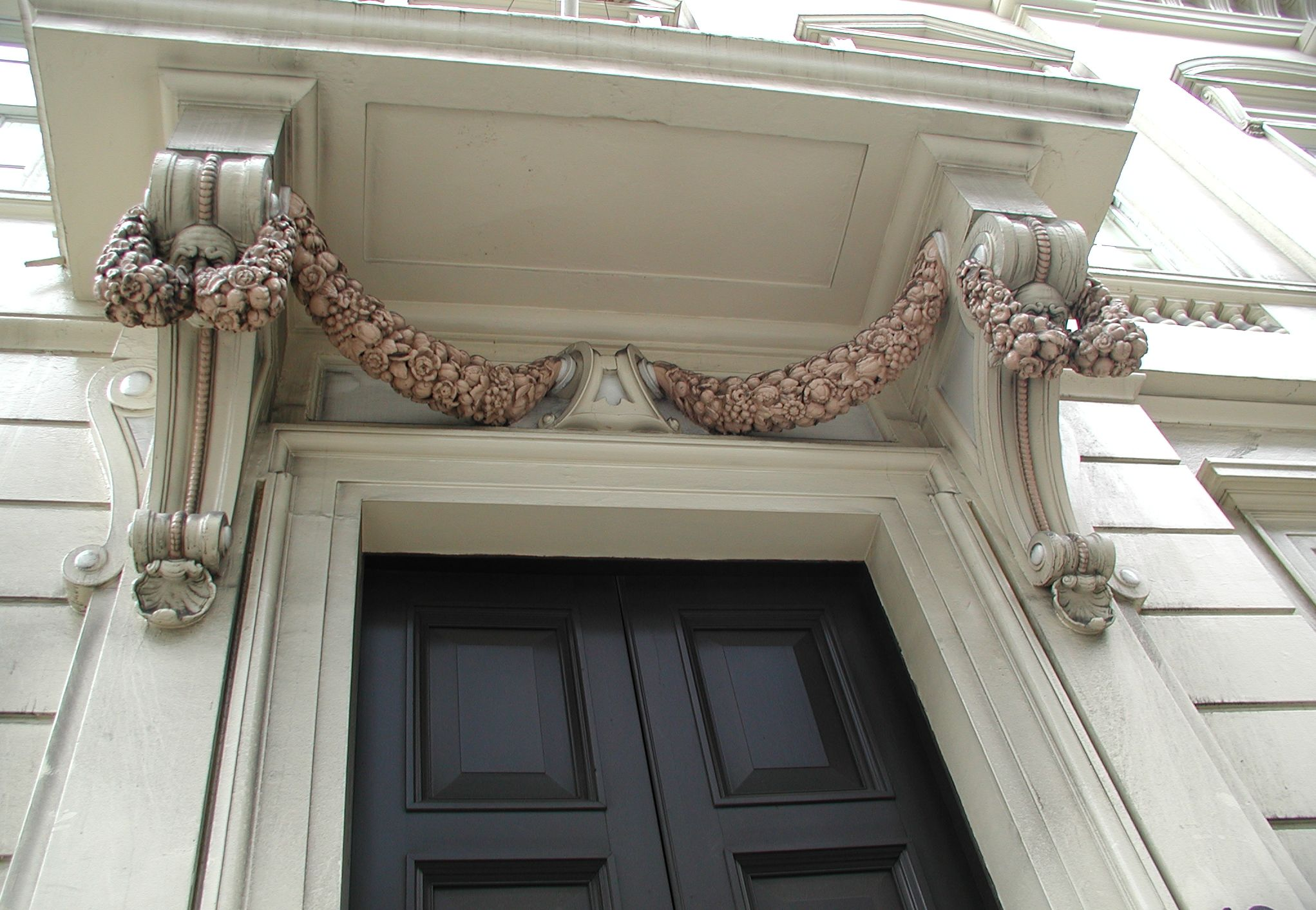
Detail of the frontage of the City of London Club

The City of London Club was established in 1832 and is the oldest of the gentlemen's clubs based in the City of London. Its Italian Palladian-style building was designed by English architect Philip Hardwick. Prince Philip, Duke of Edinburgh, was its royal patron.

To be eligible for membership, applicants traditionally had to be a partner or a director of their firm. The Club has occupied the same building at 19 Old Broad Street, near the NatWest Tower (now officially Tower 42) and Liverpool Street station, since its foundation, although it initially occupied it on a leasehold basis, with freehold being acquired in 1889. It lies in the ward of Cornhill.

An attempt in 1970 by the Club to sell their building for office space (and move to newer premises) was blocked when planning permission was refused.

Famous members have included Arthur Wellesley, 1st Duke of Wellington, and Robert Peel.

== See also ==
- List of London's gentlemen's clubs
