= Old Doctor Butler's Head =

Pub in the City of London

Coordinates: 51.515701°N 0.0905591°W

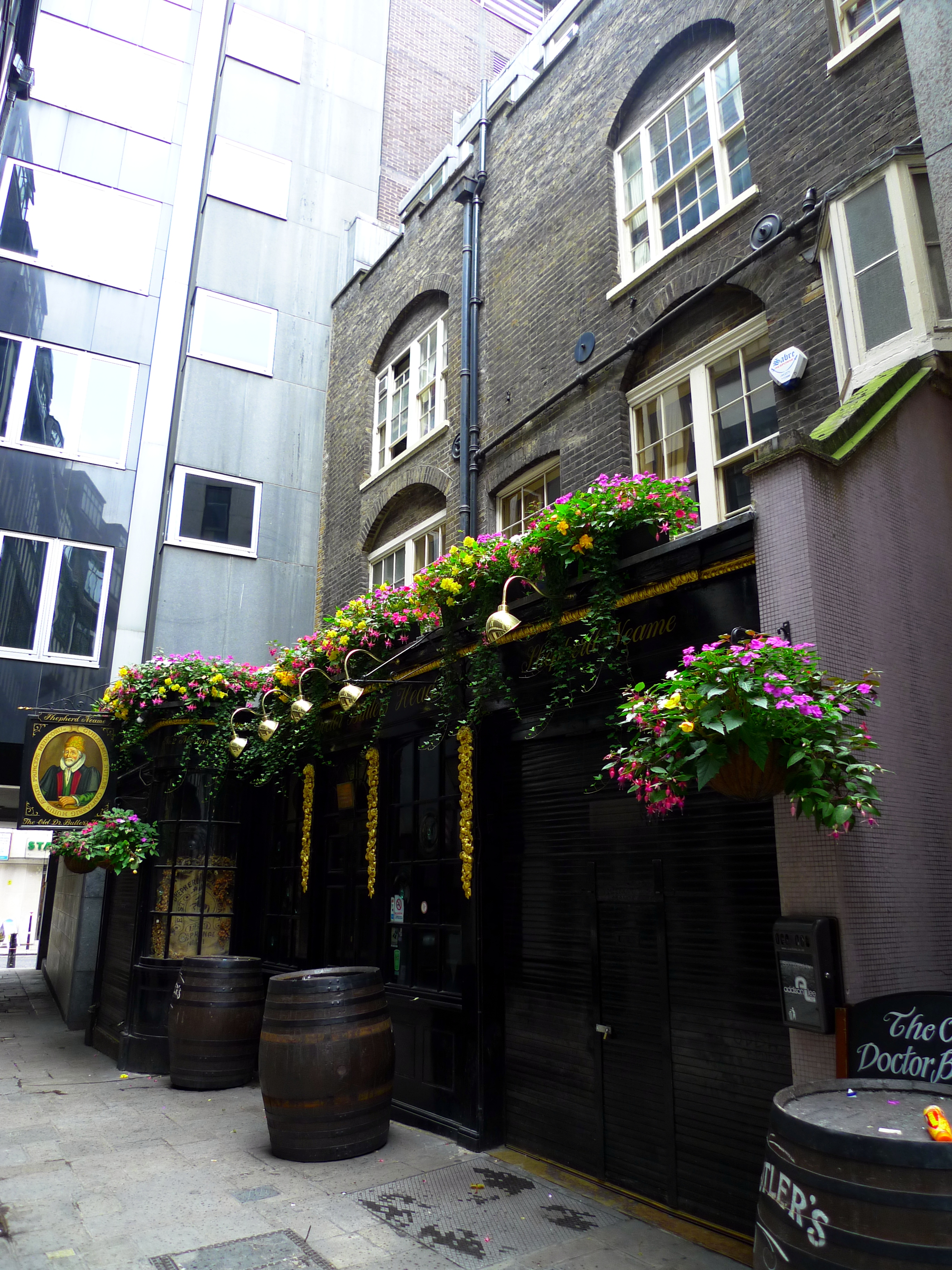
Old Doctor Butlers Head

Old Doctor Butler's Head is a pub in Mason's Avenue, London EC2. The pub was named after the physician William Butler, a doctor at the court of James I. Butler is credited with inventing the medicinal drink Dr Butler’s purging ale, which became popular in 17th-century England.

The pub is a Grade II listed building, probably dating back to the early 19th century.
