= 80 Coleman Street =

Building in Moorgate, London, England

Coordinates: 51°31′1.3″N 0°5′22.8″W

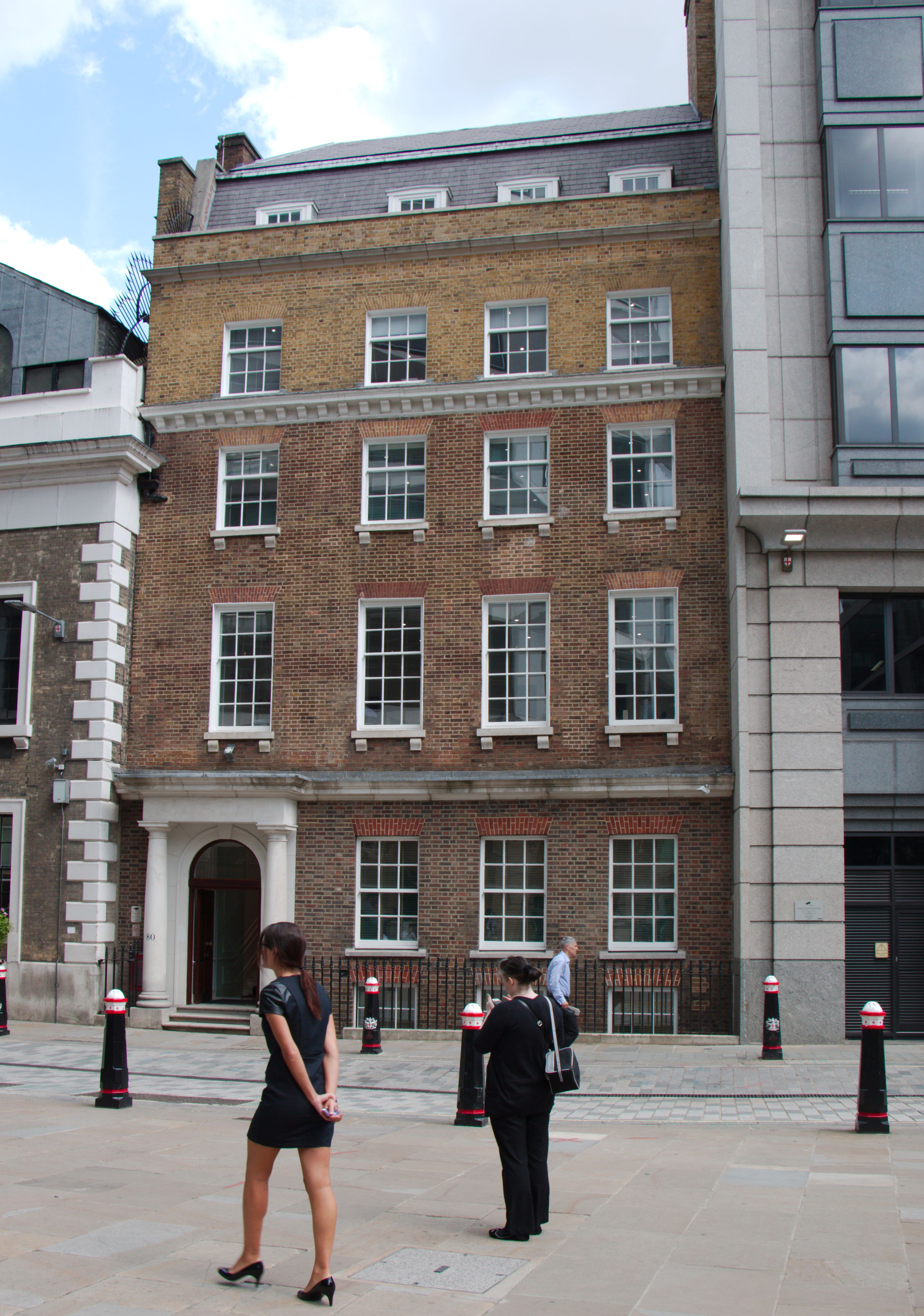
80 Coleman Street in 2014

80 Coleman Street is an Edwardian building in the Moorgate area of the City of London, not far from the Guildhall. It was used for the offices of the Institute of Marine Engineering, Science and Technology from 1999, until the Institute moved to the Aldgate area.

== History ==
Coleman Street is thought to have been the headquarters of the charcoal-burners or coalmen, at about the time of the Norman Conquest. Before coal became plentiful, charcoal was widely used as fuel. It had to be prepared by slow combustion in special hearths, the skill being handed down in families from generation to generation.

=== 16th century ===
The "Woodcut" map of London of c.1561 shows the site of 80 Coleman Street as being occupied by some part of two small houses immediately adjacent to the ancient, tumble-down Armourers' Hall. One of these houses is thought to have been the London residence of Dr William Cuningham ('Keningham' in some records), the physician, astrologer and engraver, who in 1563 was appointed Public Lecturer at Surgeons' Hall. As a physician, Cuningham would have considered himself greatly superior to those he tutored. From the Middle Ages, physicians such as Cuningham were required to embark on formal university training to gain a degree in medicine before they could practice. Possession of this doctorate entitled them to call themselves Doctor of Medicine. Until the mid-19th century surgeons didn't have to obtain a university degree, but served an apprenticeship to a surgeon and took an examination, conducted in London by the Company of Barber-Surgeons until 1745 and after 1800 by the Royal College of Surgeons. They were awarded a diploma, not a degree, and couldn't call themselves 'Doctor'. Although all medical practitioners now require a degree, the traditional title of 'Mr' had continued to apply to surgeons as a quaint anachronism.

=== 17th century ===
In the early years of the seventeenth century, on or close to the site of 80 Coleman Street, lived the attorney-at-law, Augustine Garland. His son, of the same name, was one of the regicides who in 1649 signed the death warrant of Charles I. Coleman Street was a Puritan stronghold. Oliver Cromwell is said to have lived here for a time; and in 1642 the five Members of Parliaments whom Charles I had tried to arrest in the House of Commons hid in a house in this street.

Augustine Garland the younger followed his father into the law, becoming a member of Lincoln's Inn on leaving Cambridge University. On the death of his father in 1637 he succeeded to property at Hornchurch in Essex and at Queenborough on the Isle of Sheppey. In the account which he subsequently gave of himself at his trial, he said: 'I lived in Essex at the beginning of these troubles, and I was enforced to forsake my habitation. I came from thence to London where I behaved myself fairly in my way.' On 26 May 1648 Garland was elected to parliament as the member for Queenborough. He was appointed one of the King's judges and sat as Chairman of the Committee selected to consider the method of the King's trial. At his own trial, he pleaded: 'I could not shrink for fear of my own destruction. I did not know which way to be safe in anything - without doors was misery, within doors was mischief.' He attended twelve out of sixteen meetings of the court, was present when sentence of death was pronounced, and signed the death-warrant.

Garland continued to sit in the Long Parliament until its expulsion by Cromwell. He took no part in public affairs under the Protectorate. On 9 May 1660 he was called before the Lord Mayor of London and claimed the benefit of Charles II's declaration of pardon. Nevertheless, he was 'put on his trial' and on 16 October 1660 condemned to death. Beside his share in the trial of Charles I he was accused of having spat in the King's face as he was led from Westminster Hall after being sentenced. This Garland strenuously denied, saying: 'If I was guilty of this inhumanity I desire no favour from God Almighty.' Garland's property was confiscated but the death sentence was not put into execution. He was kept a prisoner in the Tower. On 31 March 1664 a warrant was issued for his transportation to Tangier. Whether this was ever executed is not known.

=== 18th century ===
John Rocque's map of 1746 shows the site of No. 80 Coleman Street covered by a short cul-de-sac known as Bell Lane. This led to 'a tenement brew-house known as the Bell', one of many taverns then situated in Coleman Street. As Dorothy Davis had pointed out in A History of Shopping: 'anyone with a little capital could turn his house into a tavern by putting an ivy bush over his door and getting a few barrels of wine from a merchant and buying a licence for the wine from the commissioners who were only too anxious to sell.'

Richard Horwood's map of 1792–99, updated by William Faden in 1818, shows No. 80 Coleman Street separated from Armourers' Hall by the same small alley which had formerly led to the Bell tavern. This now gave access to a square courtyard which occupied the land to the rear of both buildings. Although records are very ambiguous, there are some grounds for thinking that this courtyard may have been occupied by a succession of coach-makers. Coach-building was a complex art which required many skills. Consequently, the master coach-builder employed a host of craftsmen - a skilled carpenter to design and fashion the body, a wheelwright to make the spokes and wooden rim, an upholsterer for the interior, embroiderers for the cushions, a man to varnish, another to paint the coat-of-arms on the door panel, a leather-worker to make the harness and a blacksmith to cap the wheels and to make the handles for the doors.

=== 19th century ===
By about 1812, No. 80 Coleman Street was occupied by the chandler's shop of John West. Most chandlers dealt in candles and soap, although many were general dealers, also. By 1842 no.80 was in use as a mourning warehouse. This sold every item associated with the business of bereavement from black-feathered plumes for hearses to crepe arm bands, from black-bordered visiting cards to wreaths of immortelles. It would have carried an enormous range of black fabric from which bereaved ladies, or their dressmakers, would have made their mourning wardrobes. The fact that whole businesses were devoted to the trappings of bereavement demonstrates how large a part death played in the everyday lives of Victorians.

By 1844, No. 80 was accommodating more than twenty commercial concerns, among them the Floyd Cab Company, a firm of 'jobmasters', who may well have utilised the yard which had stood at the rear of the property since at least the 1730s for storing their vehicles and stabling their horses. The centre of London was as choked by traffic in the Victorian era as it is today, although generally speaking the streets were then much narrower. Cabbies were expected to manoeuvre their horse-drawn vehicles through these congested thoroughfares at high speed. Brakes were at best rudimentary and the only real safe-guard against mishap was the skill of the driver. Few cabbies owned their vehicles. Most were hired daily from jobmasters like the Floyd Cab Company for 'yard money'. This was so extortionate that it took most men at least half a day to earn it and the greatest insult one cabby could serve another was to call out: 'Ain't yer got yer yard money yet?'

=== 20th and 21st centuries ===
No. 80 seems to have been again rebuilt, or very substantially refurbished, circa 1900. Among the more unusual businesses which it has housed since that date are the United Cigarette Machine Company (1914); the head office of the Beach Hotel at Worthing (1925); the vermin exterminators, Ratinol (1927); and Blakey's Boot Protectors (1930).

From August 1999 to August 2011 this ancient and historic site provided offices for the Institute of Marine Engineering, Science and Technology (IMarEST) which moved there from The Memorial Building at No.76 Mark Lane, now demolished. As of August 2011, The Institute of Marine Engineering, Science and Technology has since moved to the Aldgate area.
