= Britannic House, Finsbury Circus =

Office building in London, England

Britannic House
- The Finsbury Circus façade of Britannic House
- Interactive map of the Britannic House area

General information
- Type: Office
- Location: London, England
- Coordinates: 51°31′06″N 0°05′15″W
- Completed: 1925

Design and construction
- Architect: Edwin Lutyens

Listed Building – Grade II*
- Official name: Lutyens House
- Designated: 4 January 1950
- Reference no.: 1064691

Lutyens House is a Grade II* listed office block that stands on Finsbury Circus in the City of London. It is also known as Britannic House, a name shared by a number of other buildings in London.

== History ==
The building replaced a site occupied by 14 smaller buildings as part of the redevelopment of Finsbury Circus into larger office blocks. It was built between 1921 and 1925 for the Anglo-Persian Oil Company (later part of BP) at a height of 38 metres; this required special consent to surpass the limitations set out by the 1894 London Building Act. It was designed by the architect Edwin Lutyens and is considered among his most significant and most successful large business buildings.

== Design ==
The design is of a similar style to Lutyens's later Midland Bank Building on Poultry, and his Reuters Building on Fleet Street, both in the City of London. The building has three imposing Portland stone façades, interrupted by limited void spaces in its small deeply set windows and decorations. Its western side incorporates an entrance to Moorgate Underground Station.

Architectural sculpture was provided by Francis Derwent Wood as well as Messrs Broadbent & Sons. Derwent Wood produced a number of figurative sculptures including of Britannia, an Indian Water-carrier, a Persian Scarf Dancer, and a Woman and Baby or Spring. Broadbent & Sons providing decorative embellishments, keystones and garlands.

Illustration of Britannic House exhibited at the Royal Academy c. 1923

== See also ==
- Electra House
- London Wall Buildings
- Salisbury House, London
- Park House, London
