= The Globe, Moorgate =

Pub in Moorgate, London

Coordinates: 51.517669°N 0.0888048°W

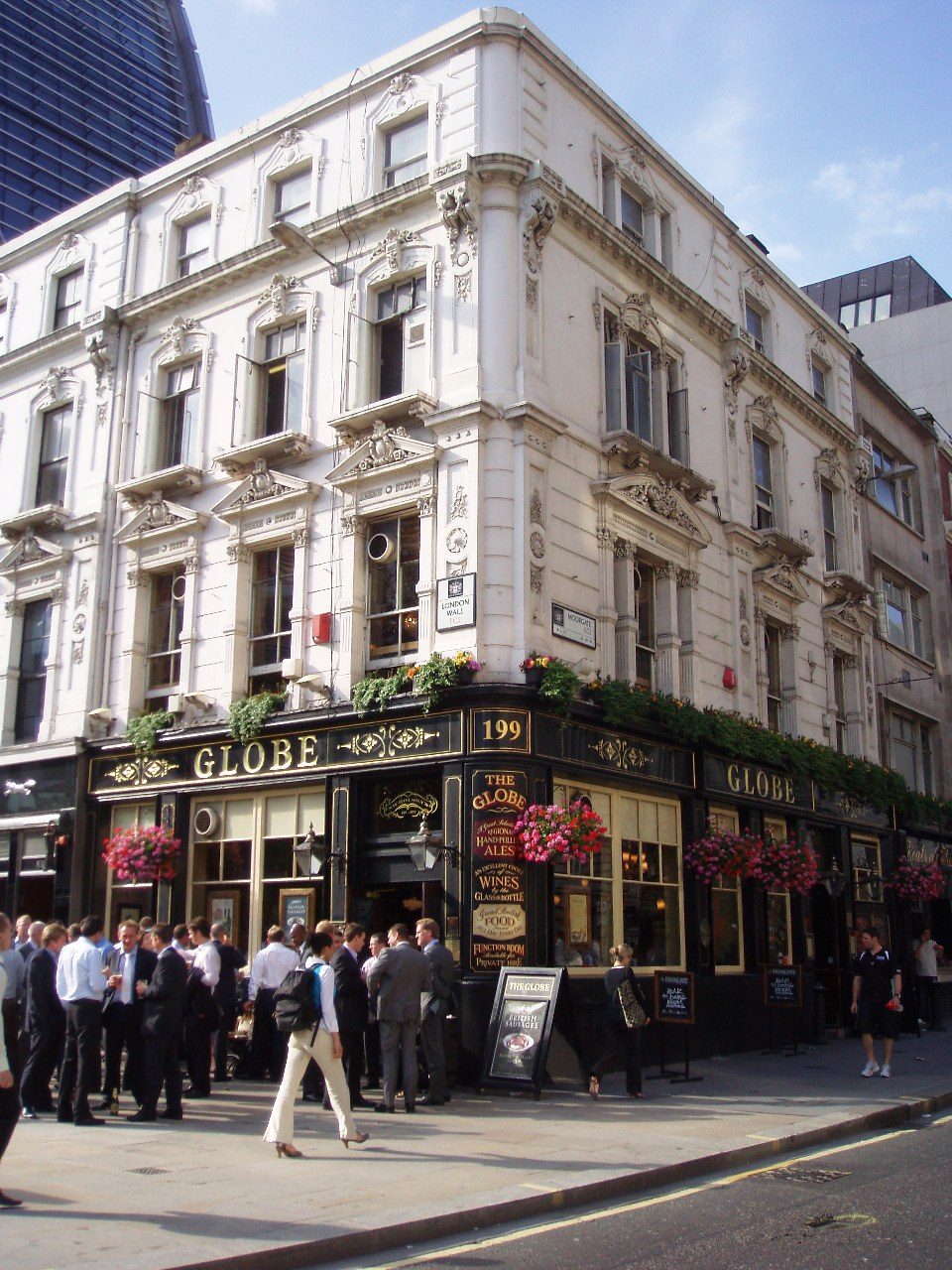
The Globe, Moorgate, EC2

The Globe is a pub at 83 Moorgate, London.

It is a Grade II listed building, built in the early 19th century.
