= Park House, London =

Office building in London, England

Park House
- The Finsbury Circus face of the building

General information
- Type: Office
- Architectural style: Neoclassicl
- Location: London, England
- Coordinates: 51°31′06″N 0°05′07″W
- Completed: 1921

Design and construction
- Architects: Gordon & Gunton

Listed Building – Grade II
- Official name: Park House and Garden House
- Designated: 10 November 1977
- Reference no.: 1192541

Park House is a Grade II listed office block that stands on Finsbury Circus and Eldon Street in the City of London.

== History and description ==
The building designed in 1915 with construction beginning in 1921. Its design employs a monumental classical style, symmetrical on both the Finsbury Circus and Eldon Street sides. The architects were Gordon & Gunton, a firm which worked on many of the other blocks characteristic of the Finsbury Circus area including Finsbury House and Salisbury House.

The building was refurbished in 2008, acquired by RREEF in 2012 for £150 million, and underwent further refurbishment in 2018 by Stiff + Trevillion. Its tenants included Bloomberg, Cisco Systems, City Index and Brown Brothers Harriman. The building was acquired by construction firm ENKA in 2025 for £186 million.

== See also ==
- London Wall Buildings
- Salisbury House
- Electra House
- Britannic House
