= 1 Old Broad Street =

Office building in London, England

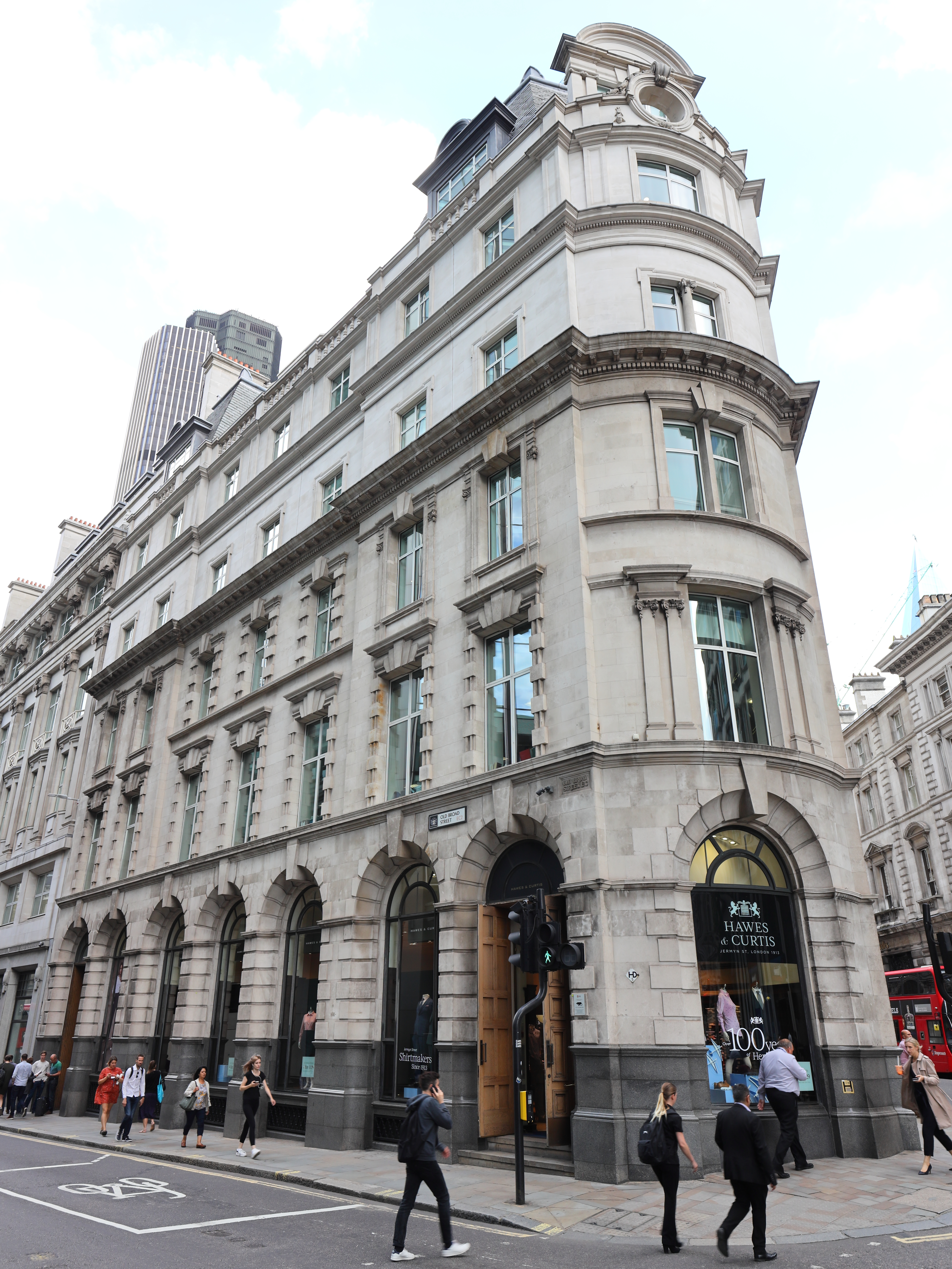

General information
- Type: Office
- Architectural style: Edwardian
- Location: London, England
- Coordinates: 51°30′51″N 0°05′10″W
- Completed: 1903

Design and construction
- Architect: Howard Chatfield Clarke

Listed Building – Grade II*
- Official name: 1, OLD BROAD STREET EC2
- Designated: 10 November 1977
- Reference no.: 1194138

1 Old Broad Street is an office building that stands where Threadneedle Street and Old Broad Street split in the City of London. It is a Grade II listed by English Heritage.

== History and description ==
The building was constructed in 1903 to the design of Howard Chatfield Clarke, son of Thomas Chatfield Clarke. It was built for the Indemnity Mutual Marine Insurance, and holds a prominent position on the corner where Old Broad Street and Threadneedle Street split. In 1911, the first branch in London of the Banca Commerciale Italiana was opened in the building.

Chatfield Clarke's original design included corner stacks and reliefs that were removed to make way for the expansion of the neighbouring Westminster Bank Building in 1936.

== See also ==
- Westminster Bank Building
