= Liverpool Street signal box =

Signal box at Liverpool Street Station, London

Coordinates: 51°31′3.40″N 0°4′58.98″W

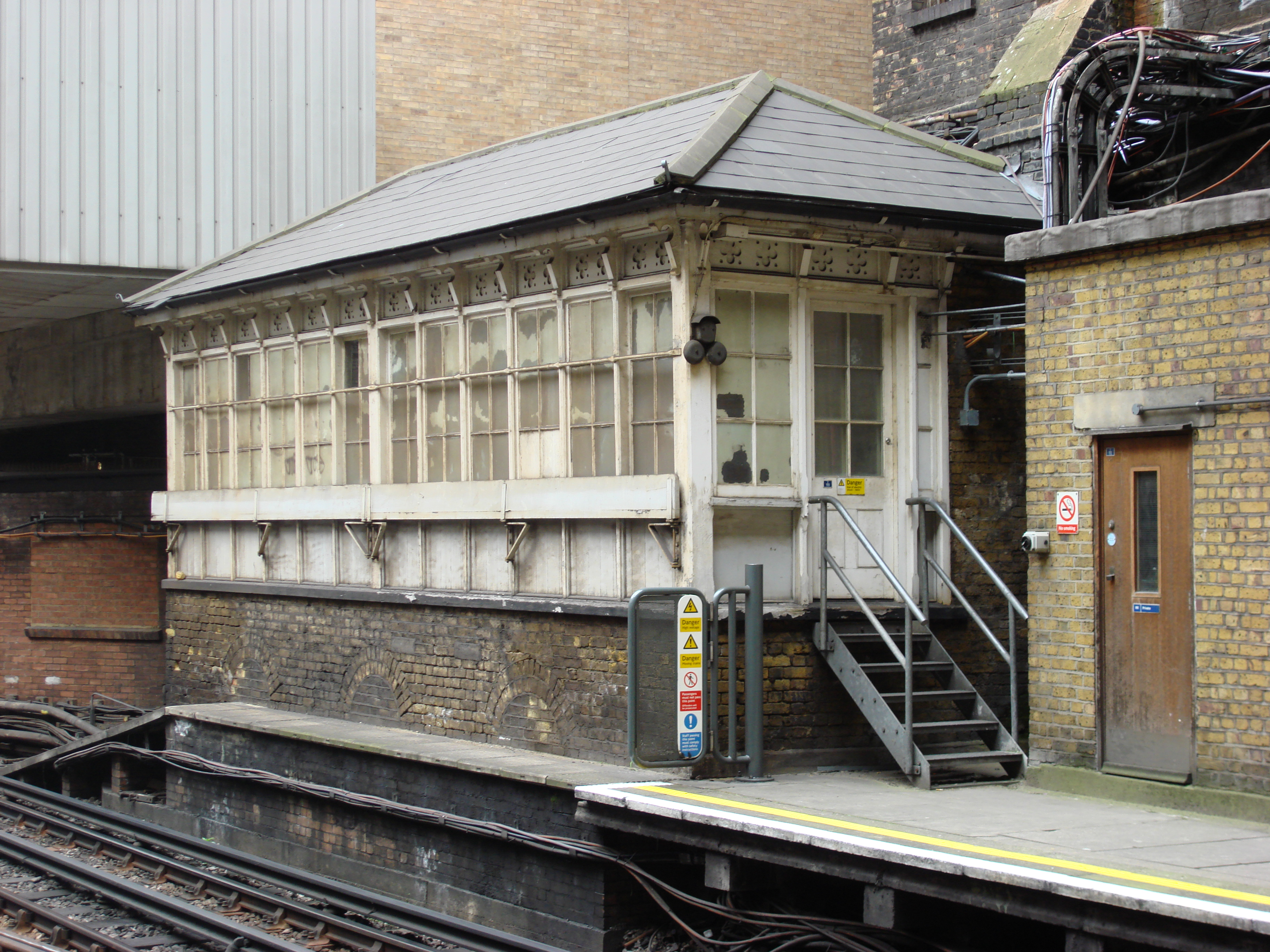
Liverpool Street signal box (2007)

The Liverpool Street signal box is a Grade II listed disused signal box at Liverpool Street tube station in Bishopsgate, London.

It was opened for operation in 1875 for an extension of the Metropolitan Railway. It was converted to an interlocking machine room in the 1950s. In 2013 it became the third signal box on the London Underground network to be listed.

== History ==
The signal box was built in 1875 on what is now the Metropolitan and Circle lines' platform at Liverpool Street for the Metropolitan Railway's extension from Moorgate. The signal box was a non-standard design designed and built by McKenzie and Holland, built of yellow stock brick, with a weatherboarded timber framed upper storey.

Originally fitted with a 40 lever frame, a second mechanical frame was installed in 1902, a 20-lever Railway Signal Company frame. On 21 February 1954 this was replaced by a 15-lever Westinghouse miniature power lever frame.

The signal box was subsequently converted to an interlocking machine room (IMR), and from 16 November 1956 it was closed and operated remotely from the Farringdon signal box. Control was transferred to Baker Street on 25 March 2001. As of 2020 the IMR is still in use.

=== Listing ===
In 2013 it was one of 26 signal boxes given listed status by Ed Vaizey, minister for the Department for Culture, Media and Sport, after a joint initiative by English Heritage and Network Rail.

The structure was given Grade II listed status as an early example of an underground railway signal box, of a specific design for the Metropolitan Railway, and as being relatively unaltered.

It was the third signal box on the London Underground network to gain listed status, after those at Chesham and Ruislip stations.
