= London Wall Buildings =

Office building in London, England

- The Finsbury Circus face of the building

General information
- Type: Office
- Architectural style: Edwardian Baroque
- Location: London, England
- Coordinates: 51°31′02″N 0°05′09″W
- Completed: 1902

Design and construction
- Architects: Gordon & Gunton

Listed Building – Grade II
- Official name: London Wall Buildings
- Designated: 15 August 1997
- Reference no.: 1375268

London Wall Buildings is a Grade II listed office block that stands bounded by Finsbury Circus, London Wall and Blomfield Street in the City of London.

== History and description ==
The building was built between 1901 and 1902 to designs by Gordon & Gunton in a grand Edwardian Baroque style. Its prominent slate pavilion roof suffered damage by bombing during the Blitz.

The site encompasses nearly the entire plot of the southeast corner of Finsbury Circus. With Finsbury House, predating the block and developed by the same firm, occupying the remainder. It was built as a speculative development around the time when many grand office buildings were going up in Finsbury Circus, including Salisbury House of a similar provenance to its west built shortly before. These new blocks were enabled by the cessation of leases surrounding the gardens and were of a much larger scale than seen for office buildings in London during the Victorian era.

The building hosted the headquarters of the accounting firm Deloitte from 1905 to 1964. A leasehold on the building was sold in 2018 by the City of London Corporation to joint developers Angelo Gordon and Endurance Land who planned to refurbish the building. Planning permission was granted in 2020 for the designs of Carmoady Groarke, with his plans included the reinstatement of the old pavilion roof.

== See also ==
- Britannic House
- Salisbury House
- Park House
