= Hoop and Grapes, Aldgate High Street =

Pub in the City of London

Coordinates: 51.51421°N 0.074177°W

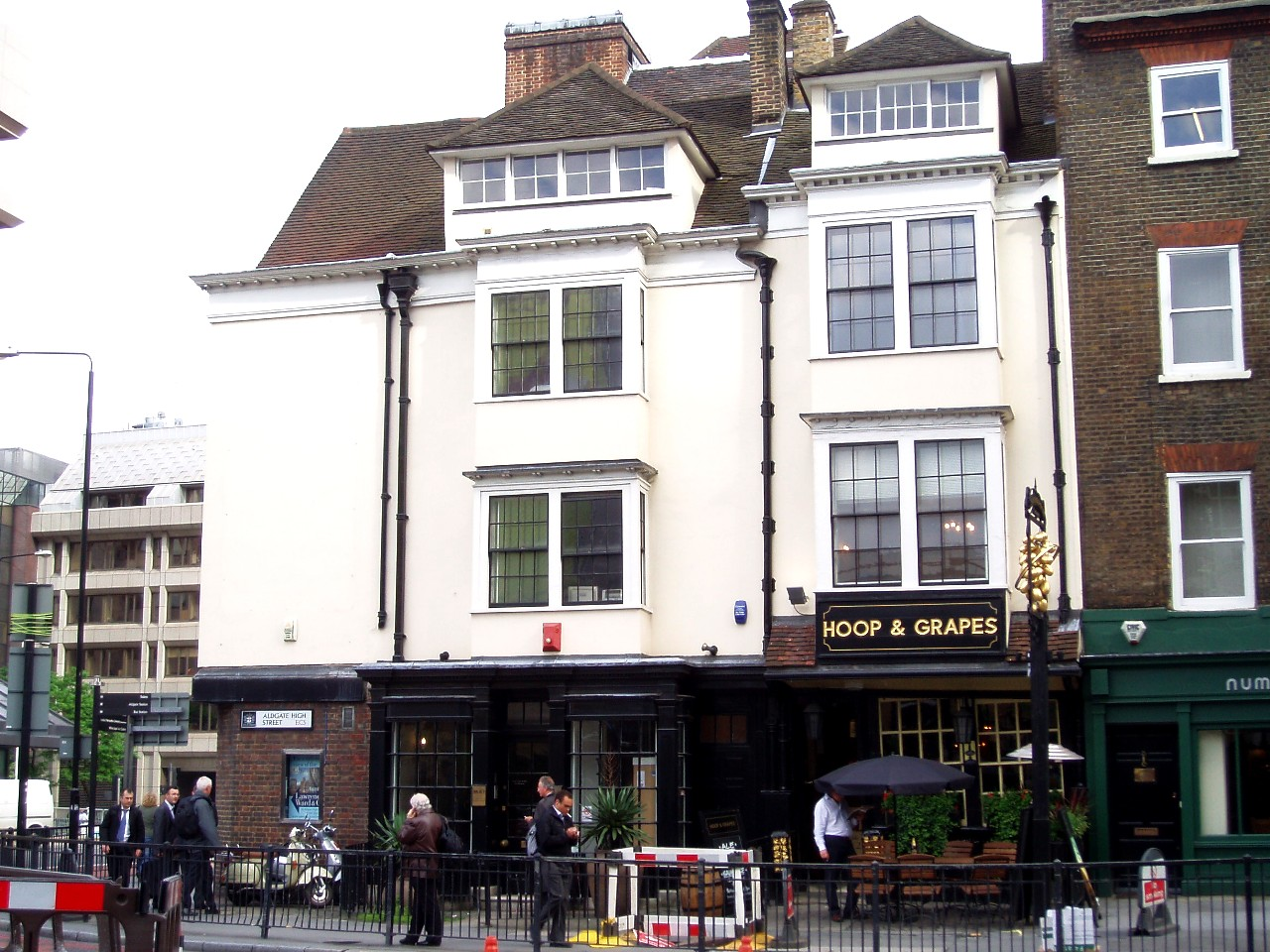
The Hoop and Grapes

The Hoop and Grapes is a Grade II* listed public house at Aldgate High Street in the City of London.

Historic England notes that it was probably built in the late 17th century, and that it is "a type of building once common in London but now very rare."

== See also ==
- List of buildings that survived the Great Fire of London
