= Arthur Joseph Davis =

English architect

Arthur Davis
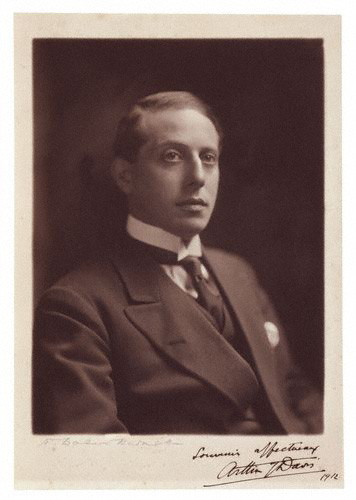
- Arthur J.Davis, F.R.I.B.A (1912: photograph by Henry Walter Barnett)
- Born: Arthur Joseph Davis; 21 May 1878; Kensington, London, England
- Died: 1951; Kensington, London, England
- Occupation: Architect
- Spouse: Rona Jean D. Lee (1899–1940)
- Children: 1 d.

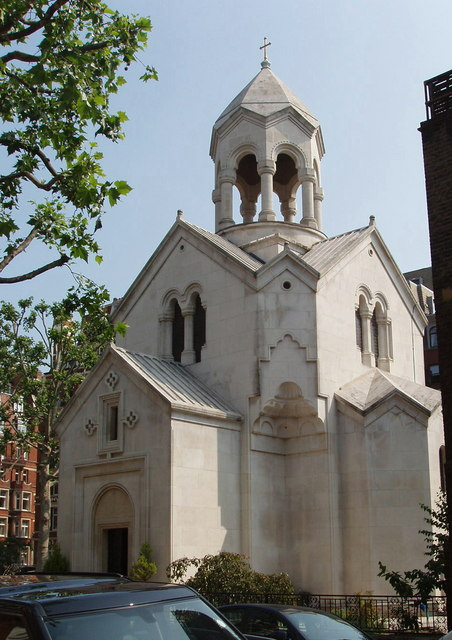
St Sarkis Armenian Church, London

Arthur Joseph Davis RA (21 May 1878, Kensington, London – 22 July 1951, Kensington, London) was an English architect.

Davis studied at the École des Beaux-Arts, Paris in the 1890s. He was the co-partner in the firm Mewes & Davis, with Charles Mewès. The firm designed the elevations and interior decoration of the London Ritz Hotel which introduced modern French comfort and luxury enabled by an innovative steel frame construction. In addition, the partnership took on numerous private commissions including Luton Hoo for Sir Julius Wernher, Coombe Court for Countess De Grey and Polesden Lacey for the Hon Mrs Ronald Greville. Prior to World War I, Davis worked on a number of ocean liners such as the Aquitania (1911–14); and after his military service he designed a number of banks in London. His last major commission was the Queen Mary (1935).

In 1949 he gave his recreations as golf and water-colour sketching.

== Notable buildings ==
- St. Sarkis Church (London) (1922–1923), Grade II* listed
