= Statue of John Keats =

There are two statues of the poet John Keats in London.

- Statue of John Keats, at Guy's Hospital (2007) by Stuart Williamson
- Statue of John Keats, Moorgate (2024) by Martin Jennings
