= Marsh Award for Excellence in Public Sculpture =

Annual award for public sculpture in the UK or Ireland

The Marsh Award for Excellence in Public Sculpture is an annual award for public sculpture in the UK or Ireland.

The Award is funded by the Marsh Charitable Trust and is made on the recommendation of a panel of judges under the auspices of the Public Statues and Sculpture Association (PSSA), formerly the Public Monuments and Sculpture Association (PMSA).

== Scope and ceremonies ==
The award is generally made to a work of new sculpture, which has to be erected in a place accessible to the public. However awards have also been made to restorations of historic sculpture and in 2011 an award was made to the town of Harlow in Essex for its work in creating an environment for sculpture in the town and promoting this as Harlow Sculpture Town.

The Award Ceremony is held annually at the PMSA headquarters in Cowcross Street, London, every November, although in 2009 it was held at the Whitechapel Art Gallery, when it was presented by Boris Johnson.

The PMSA also organises a biennial award for public fountains in association with the Marsh Christian Trust. The Trust also organises other awards in arts, heritage, conservation and the environment and social welfare, with other organisations.

== Past winners ==
Winners of the Marsh Award for Public Sculpture include:

- 2006: Maggi Hambling for Scallop
- 2006: Jim Hurley & his team for restoration of the Sheffield Cholera Monument
- 2007: Bryan Kneale RA, for Capt Quilliam
- 2007: James Turrell for Deer Shelter Skyspace (at Yorkshire Sculpture Park)
- 2008: SI Applied Ltd for Cutting Edge, Sheffield, Yorkshire
- 2008: Ian Rank-Broadley for the Armed Forces Memorial
- 2009: Jaume Plensa for Dream
- 2010: Peter W. Naylor for the Memorial to 158 Squadron
- 2011: Andrew Sabin for The Coldstones Cut
- 2011: Harlow Art Trust, for Harlow Sculpture Town
- 2012: Gordon Young for Comedy Carpet
- 2012: Carmody Groarke for Indian Ocean Tsunami Memorial
- 2013: Philip Jackson for the RAF Bomber Command Memorial
- 2014: Richard Wilson for Slipstream
- 2015: Antony Gormley for Room
- 2015: Douglas Jennings for Squadron Leader Mahinder Singh Puji DFC
- 2016: David Nash for Habitat
- 2017: Martin Jennings for Women of Steel
- 2017: Rodney Harris and Valda Jackson for Four Brick Reliefs
- 2018: Martin Jennings for George Orwell
- 2021: Hazel Reeves for Our Emmeline
- 2022: Veronica Ryan for Caribbean Fruits
- 2023: Kenny Hunter for Your Next Breath
- 2024: Tim Shaw for Man on Fire
- 2025: Will Maclean and Marian Leven for na Dorsen
- 2026: Nathan Coley for Stages
