= Statue of George Orwell =

Statue outside Broadcasting House, London

George Orwell
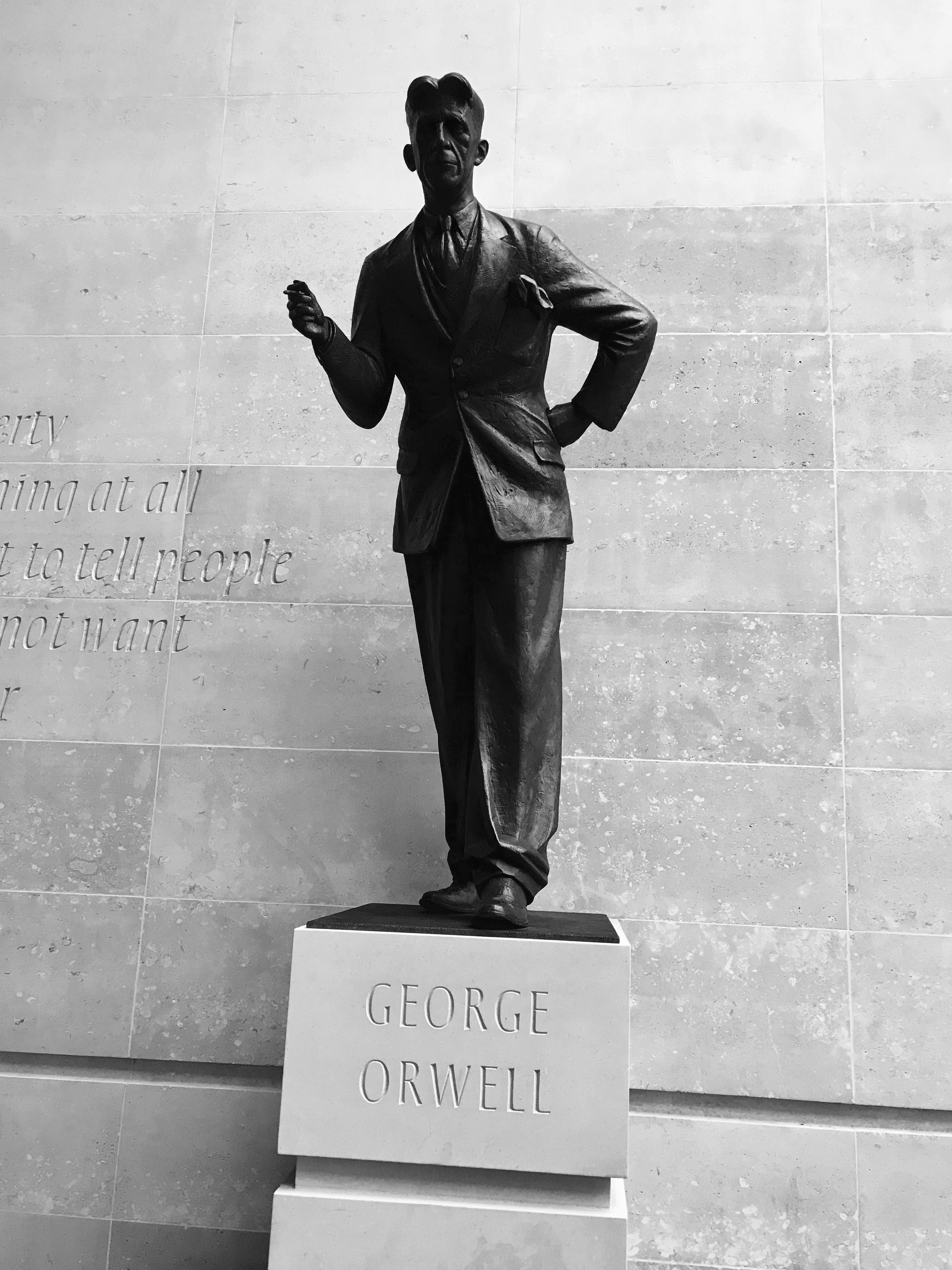
- Artist: Martin Jennings
- Year: 2017; 9 years ago
- Type: Bronze
- Location: London, W1 United Kingdom; 51.5188°N 0.1429°W

A statue of George Orwell by the British sculptor Martin Jennings was unveiled on 7 November 2017 outside Broadcasting House, the headquarters of the BBC, in central London.

The wall behind the statue is inscribed with George Orwell's words "If liberty means anything at all, it means the right to tell people what they do not want to hear", from an unused preface to Animal Farm. The head of BBC history, Robert Seatter, said of Orwell and the statue that "He reputedly based his notorious Room 101 from Nineteen Eighty-Four on a room he had worked in whilst at the BBC, but here he will stand in the fresh air reminding people of the value of journalism in holding authority to account."

== Creation ==
The statue was funded by a trust established by the Labour MP Ben Whitaker, with all funds coming from private donors. Notable donors to the trust included Ian McEwan, Andrew Marr, Ken Follett, Rowan Atkinson, Neil and Glenys Kinnock, Tom Stoppard, David Hare and Michael Frayn. In 2012 the BBC had rejected the offer of the statue, reportedly due to the opposition of the then director-general, Mark Thompson, but the project was revived under the next director-general, Tony Hall. Whitaker died in 2014 and the project was continued by his wife, Janet Whitaker, Baroness Whitaker.

Jennings was chosen as the sculptor because Whitaker admired his sculptures of John Betjeman at St Pancras station and Philip Larkin in Hull. Jennings said that Orwell was "...an ideal subject for a sculptor: loomingly tall, skinny as a rake, forever [with] fag in hand, body leaning in to make a point. He wore the kind of clothes that might have spent their off-duty hours hanging from a nail in the potting shed."

== Reception ==
The architectural critic Gavin Stamp (under the pseudonym "Piloti"), in Private Eye, awarded the statue the "Sir Hugh Casson Award for 2017's ugliest new building" [sic] – "if sculpture is eligible". Orwell "surely deserves better", he wrote. "The great man is depicted holding a fag, dressed in a crumpled suit and standing like a music hall artist about to crack a joke. The plinth is pathetic. ... No hint here of Orwell's ambivalent relationship with the BBC." Jennings pointed out that "smoking was so much a part of [Orwell's] identity that it would have been unthinkable not to represent him with a roll-up between his fingers." Professor Richard Keeble, then chair of The Orwell Society, responded in Private Eye's letters page that "the plinth on which the statue stands seems to fit in perfectly with the building."

On BBC Radio 4's Front Row, the critic Sarah Gaventa also questioned the use of a plinth for this "man of the people". Gaventa was approving of the sculpture itself. "You can see he wants to get into the conversation and give you his very honest and forthright opinions. It's Orwell. Who else could it be? When you look at the canon of Martin Jennings's work… it's about brave people who speak out. I'm sure it will become a much-loved addition to the BBC." On BBC News Jennings explained his decision to elevate the statue: "Of course you make aesthetic decisions as well. He's up against a great big cliff of a stone wall and you need to frame it within that space. It couldn't have been at ground level."

In 2018 the statue won Jennings the Public Monuments and Sculpture Association's Marsh Award for Excellence in Public Sculpture. This was the first time the prize had been awarded to the same sculptor for two years in succession, Jennings having won in 2017 with Women of Steel, a sculptural group in Sheffield. Ownership of the statue was transferred to The Orwell Society in 2021.
