= Statue of Jane Austen =

2025 statue in Winchester, England

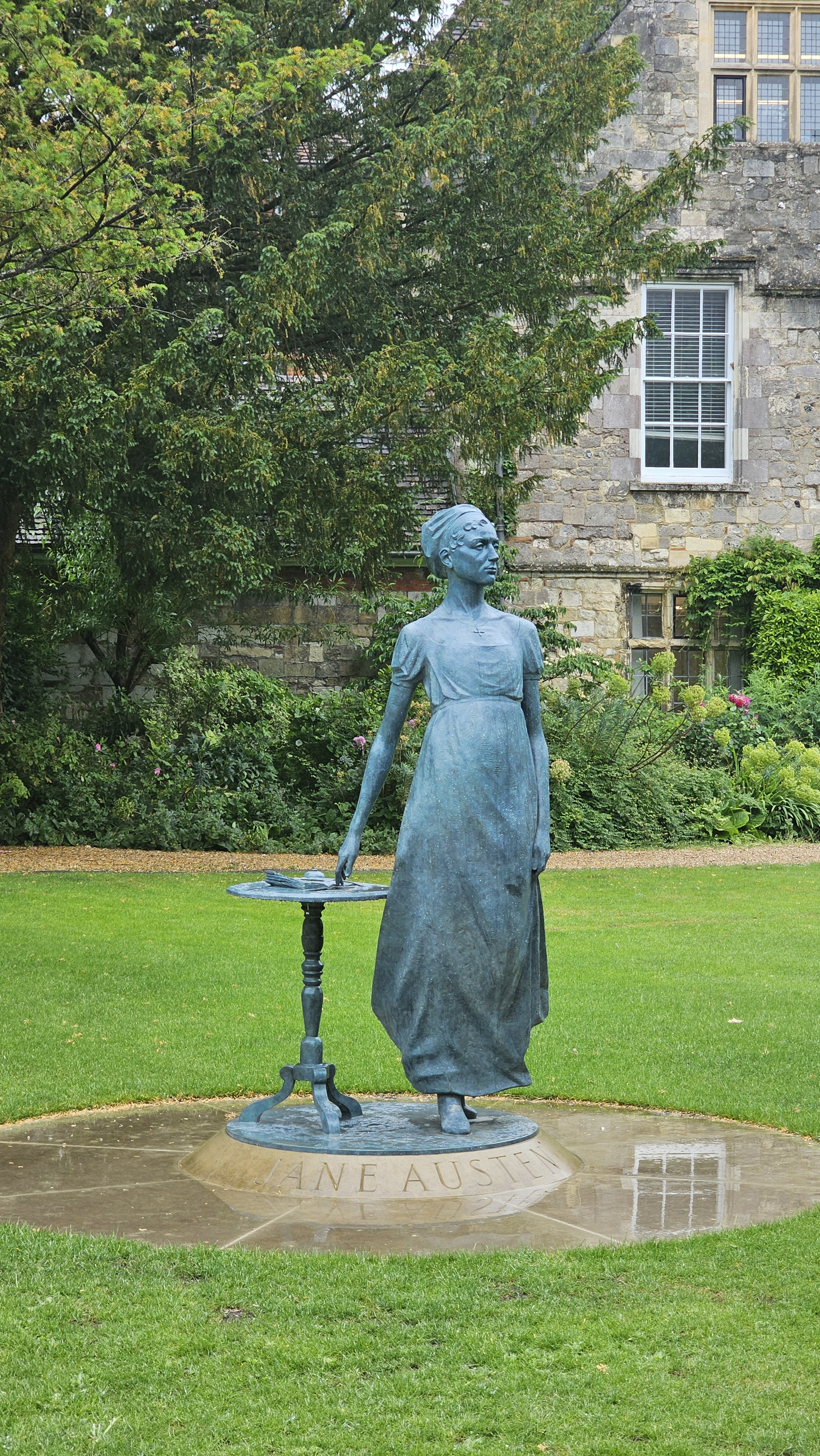
Statue of Jane Austen in Winchester

A statue of Jane Austen was unveiled at Winchester Cathedral in October 2025. It was sculpted by Martin Jennings.

The statue depicts Austen "with her ringlets and cap" standing next to her writing table. It is situated outside 9 The Close.

Jennings "studied the available evidence to produce a likeness" of Austen as there are no definitive images of her. Winchester Cathedral described Jennings' "overall conception, reflected in her expression and posture, emphasises [Austen's] moral vision and the strength of her literary legacy".

There were previous plans for Jennings to create a statue of Austen in Winchester, but these were abandoned in 2019. It was unveiled on 16 October 2025 during a special service at the cathedral by the Lord Lieutenant of Hampshire, Nigel Atkinson, the Interim Dean of Winchester Cathedral Roland Riem, and Martin Jennings. The service will also feature readings from Austen's novel Pride and Prejudice with actors Joanna David, Susannah Harker, and Adrian Lukis who appeared in the 1995 BBC TV adaptation.
