= Andrew Sabin =

British sculptor (born 1958)

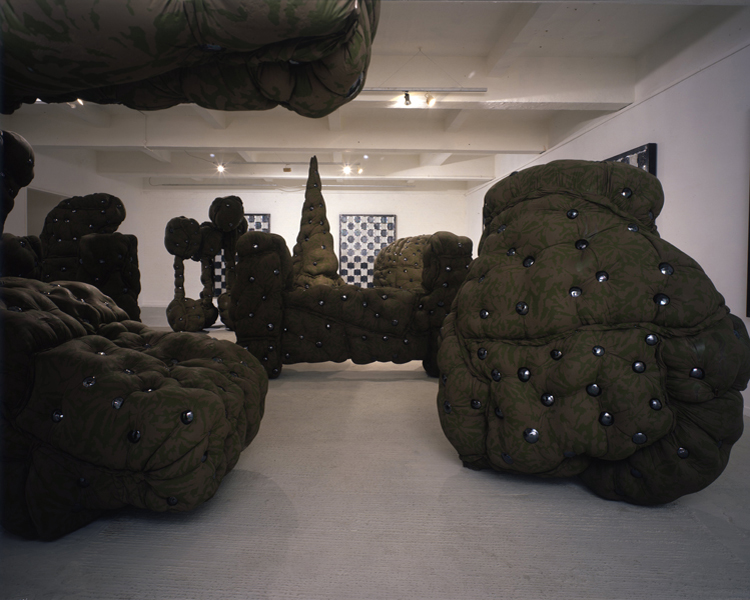
Andrew Sabin at the Chisenhale Gallery, London (supported by the Henry Moore Trust)

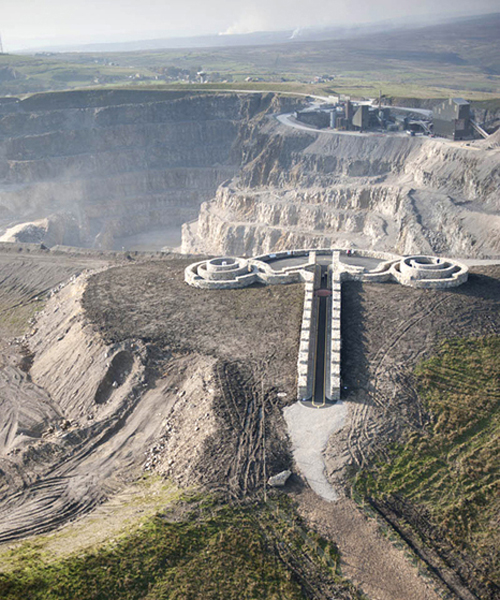
'The Coldstones Cut', Andrew Sabin, 2010

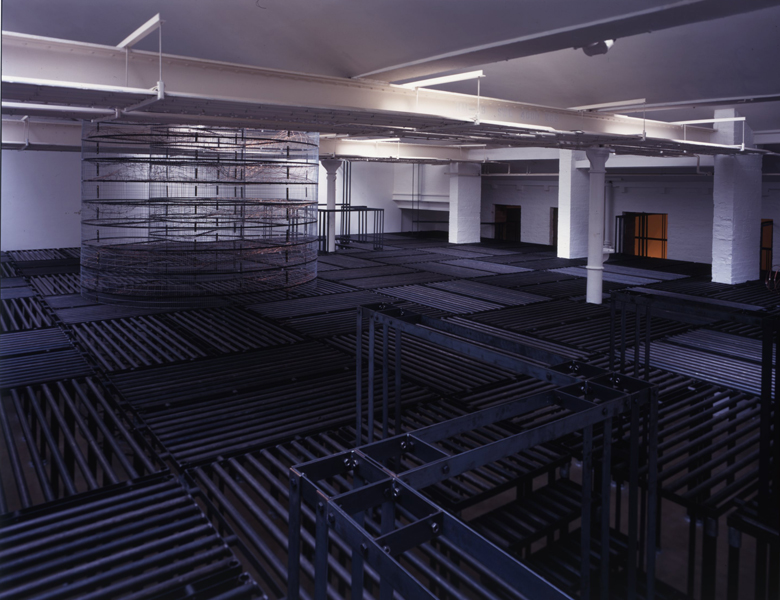
'Open Sea', Andrew Sabin, Henry Moore Institute, 1997

Andrew Sabin (born 1958, London, England) is a British sculptor. He studied at Chelsea College of Art (1979–1983) where he worked as a senior lecturer until 2006.

== Life and work ==
A pioneering experimental object maker until 1989, his debut exhibition was with his partner, Laura Ford, in an artist-occupied shop in Islington, later exhibiting at Whitechapel Gallery and Casting an Eye, Cornerhouse Gallery Manchester (1987) alongside Julian Opie, Richard Deacon and Alison Wilding. Exhibiting twice (1989 and 1990) with solo shows at Salama-Caro Gallery, Cork Street.

Sabin produced his first major installation for the Chisenhale Gallery in East London (1990). The works were constructed from hard masses of expanded polyeurathane, fibreglass and steel covered with camouflage nylon and studded with lustre-glazed ceramic buttons. On the walls hung ten large steel framed grids of black and white glazed tiles. The installation later formed an important element in New Light on Sculpture 1991, Tate Liverpool alongside artists such as Tony Cragg and Ron Haseldon.

'The Sea of Sun' was commissioned in 1992 by Battersea Arts Centre and the Henry Moore Trust. First exhibited at BAC it went on to form part of the inaugural exhibition of European sculpture at The Henry Moore Institute, 'Cell, Cella, Celda' in 1993 alongside Vittorio Messina, Jaume Plensa and Edward Allington. The installation toured to the Musée de l'Élysée in Lausanne as part of the 'Century of the Body' Exhibition and subsequently to Culturgest, Lisbon. The installation was composed of thousands of chains hung from the ceiling to the floor to make numerous interlinked enclosures or cells, their floating walls anodized with figurative images and abstract shapes and colors.

In 1997 Sabin made the final part of his trilogy of installation, 'The Open Sea', was commissioned by the Henry Moore Sculpture Studio in Halifax as part of a programme of sculpture residencies that included over a 10-year period projects by Giuseppe Penone, Richard Long, Jannis Kounellis, Lawrence Weiner, James Turrel and Georg Herold. 'The Open Sea' was a vast structure with a layered interior and penetrated by patterns and sculptural forms. "Considered as a structure, comparison can be made with the architecture at the edge of the sea such as boardwalks and the traditional English Pier, and also with the fantastic structures of the fairground". Robert Hopper

At the end of 1997 Sabin turned his attentions away from gallery based exhibitions towards the public realm. Between 1997 and 2000 Sabin devised the 'C-bin' project collaborating with fellow sculptor Stefan Shankland to realise it around the coastline of Europe. The success of this as an approach to sculpture in the public realm led to his appointment as lead artist in a series of large scale projects in both urban and rural contexts. Working as lead artist at the Horsebridge Development in Whitstable from 2001 to 2003, during which time he made 'History Wall'. A steel mesh housing filled with carefully layered and tightly packed materials selected from the demolition of the town centre.

Between 2002 and 2005 Sabin was lead artist on the River Wandle Cycle Route realizing amongst other works 'Square Bridge' and 'Round Bridge' at Ravensbury Park. In 2005 he was commissioned by Bracknell Forest Council to make The Calibrated Ramp and as a result was appointed lead artist for ‘Art changes Bracknell’ in 2006. Later in 2006 he was commission by Hanson Heidelberg to make 'The Coldstones Cut', which was completed in 2010 and won Sabin the Marsh Award for Excellence in Public Sculpture for 2011. Located in the Yorkshire Dales above Pateley Bridge.

'Coldstones Cut' situated at Coldstones Quarry on Greenhow Hill is one of the highest quarries in England. Construction commenced on site in March 2010 and the sculpture was officially opened by Dr. Penelope Curtis, director of Tate Britain on 16 September 2010. Described by The Guardian as "the giant of the Dales and the best public artwork of the year". In 2011 he was commissioned by the Royal Borough of Kensington and Chelsea to replace Henry Moore 'Two Piece Reclining Figure no.1' on the site of the former Chelsea School of Art in Manresa Rd, Chelsea.

Simultaneous to his work in the public realm Sabin continued a rigorous studio practice; "deep and enduring interest in the fundamentals of how it can be used, pieced together and negotiated. This interest is employed to make work which is formally, intellectually and often physically challenging." Jes Fernie. He was included in 'Other Criteria' (2004) at Henry Moore Institute taking stock of one hundred years of British sculpture' and in 'Over Under' (2007) at Canary Wharf with Keith Wilson and Franz West.

== Public projects ==
- 2012–14 Grizedale Forest – High Fell House
- 2012 ‘Painting and Sculpture’ – Henry Moore Court, Manresa Rd, London
- 2007 ‘Over Under’, Jubilee Park, Canary Wharf, with Phyllida Barlow, Franz West and Keith Wilson
- 2006–10 ‘The Coldstones Cut’, Coldstones Quarry, Yorkshire. An installation for Hanson PLC
- 2003–6 'The Calibrated Ramp' for Kings Oak Developers and Bracknell Forest B.C.
- 2005 Lead artist, ‘Art changes Bracknell’
- 2002–5 Lead Artist, River Wandle Cycle Route, London. Works include 'The Square and Round Bridges' and the 'Viewing Platform' at the confluence of the Wandle and Graveney. Supported by RSA Art for Architecture Award SEEDA, Arts Council England, Bridgehouse Trust
- 2001–3 Lead Artist, Horsebridge Development, Whitstable. Supported by Arts & Business, Arts Council South East, Arts Council England Personal Development Award
- 2001 Abbey Road commission, Barrow
- 2001 'Spring Vale' commission, Bilston
- 2000 The 'C-bin' project, Picardie, France Supported by Conseil Regionale de Picardie, DRAC de Picardie, Aceil Ecole Superieur d'Arta Design d'Amien, British Council
- 2000 'The Bottle Tower', Ecos Centre, Ballymena, Northern Ireland

== Selected solo exhibitions ==
- 1999 The Sea of Sun, Culturgest, Lisbon. Supported by the British Council
- 1997 The Open Sea, The Henry Moore Sculpture Studio, Dean Clough, Halifax
- 1995 The Sea of Sun, Musée de l'Élysée, Lausanne, Switzerland. Supported by the British Council
- 1992 The Sea of Sun, BAC Gallery, London. Supported by the Association of Business Sponsorship for the Arts, Henry Moore Trust
- 1990 Salama-Caro Gallery, London
- 1990 Andrew Sabin at the Chisenhale Gallery, London. Supported by the Henry Moore Trust
- 1989 Salama-Caro Gallery, London

== Selected group exhibitions ==
- 2004 Other Criteria: Sculpture in 20th Century Britain, Henry Moore Institute
- 1999 'The C-bin', Middelkerke Monumental, Belgium. Supported by the British Council
- 1997 'British Sculpture', La Nuova Pesa Gallery, Rome. Supported by the British Council
- 1995 'British Sculpture Kunstbunker', Munich with two other artists. Supported by the British Council. British Abstract Sculpture, Flowers East, London
- 1994 'Material Evidence', Cubitt St Gallery, London and Norwich Art Gallery, Norwich. Supported by the Henry Moore Trust
- 1993 'Cell, Cella, Celda', Henry Moore Institute, Leeds
- 1991 'New Light on Sculpture', Tate Gallery, Liverpool
- 1989 'New British Sculpture', Harry Zellweger, Basel. Supported by the British Council
- 1987 'Casting an Eye', The Cornerhouse, Manchester
- 1987 'Whitechapel Open', Whitechapel Gallery, London

== Collections ==
- Arts Council
- Henry Moore Institute
- Leeds City Art Gallery
- Cass Sculpture Foundation, Sculpture at Goodwood
- Various private collections.

== Catalogues ==
- Public Works, Andrew Sabin & Stefan Shankland, The University of the Art, CCC, 2006
- Sculpture in the 20th century Britain, Henry Moore Institute, 2003
- The Open Sea, Andrew Sabin, Henry Moore Sculpture Trust 1997
- Sea of Sun, Battersea Arts Centre, 1992
- Cell: Cella: Celda, The Henry Moore Institute 1994
- Andrew Sabin, An Installation of New Works, Chisenhale Gallery 1990
- Andrew Sabin Sculpture 1986–1989 Salma – Caro Gallery
- Second Sight, Henry Moore Foundation, 2000

== Publications ==
- 2003

Fernie, Jes, "Sculpture in 20th Century Britain"
Kingston, Angela, "The Horsebridge"
Holman, Martin, "Sculpture along the Wandle Trail"

- 1998

Hopper, Robert, Art and Architecture, October issue

- 1997

Hall, James, Artforum, September issue
Lambirth, Andrew, Contemporary Visual Arts, June issue
Mullins, Charlotte, Blueprint, July/August issue

- 1996

Flubacher, Christophe, L'Hebdo – Lausanne
Jost Martin-Imbach, Der Bund, Bern

- 1995

Hilton, Tim, Independent on Sunday, 13 August

- 1994

Dorment, Richard, Daily Telegraph, 18 May
Hall, James, Guardian, 8 August

- 1993

McCrone, John, "The Mapping of Memory"
Hatton, Brian, "Hybrid Architectures and Microscapes"
Macritchie, Lynn, "Classical in question", Financial Times, 14 December
Wilson, Andrew, Andrew Sabin: The Sea of Sun, Forum International, January issue
Hall, James, British Art Now, ARTNews, September issue
Art & Design Profile, Installation Art No.30 – Text by Andrew Sabin
Hall, James, "Unchained Reactions", The Independent, 5 January
"CELL, CELLA, CELDA", Exhib. Cat. Henry Moore Institute UnTelevision Issue 1.1I
Audio Arts, Volume No. 3
Hall, James, Pick of the Year, Arts Review, January issue
Wilson, Andrew, London Winter Round-up, Art Monthly, February issue
