= John Ravera =

English sculptor

Ravera's Dolphin Fountain in the Barbican Estate

John Ravera (1941 – 2006) was a British sculptor known mainly for his figurative works. He was a noted user and teacher of Old Master sculpting techniques.

== Early life and education ==
Ravera was born in Surrey in 1941 and studied at the Camberwell School of Arts and Crafts where Karel Vogel was one of his tutors. Afterwards, Ravera completed his training as an assistant to various sculptors including Oscar Nemon, with whom he would help sculpt his 1962 statue of Winston Churchill in Westerham, Kent.

== Career ==
He produced work from a studio in Bexleyheath with access to his own casting facilities, using Meridian Bronze only for larger works. At his own foundry, he was able to develop experimental techniques in resin and fibreglass which he taught to others. His time as a teacher included tenures at the Sidcup Art Centre and Woolwich Adult Education Centre, where he taught Nigel Boonham. Ravera's 1990 Dolphin Fountain of the Barbican Estate marked the completion of the North Barbican Podium works.
