= Statue of John Keats, Moorgate =

Sculpture by Martin Jennings

Statue of John Keats
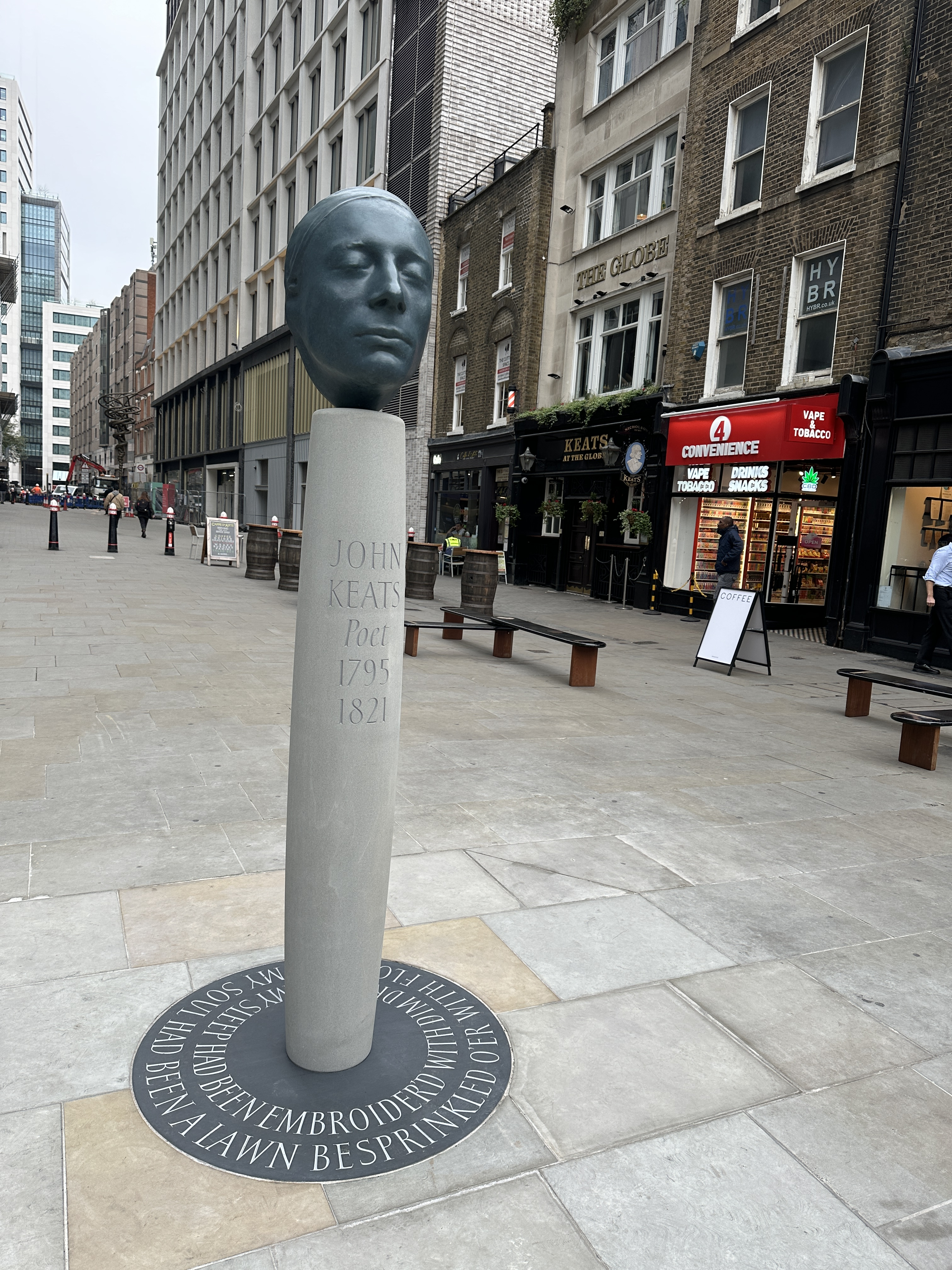
- Artist: Martin Jennings
- Year: 2024
- Completion date: 2024
- Medium: Sculpture
- Subject: John Keats
- Location: Moorgate, City of London, United Kingdom; 51°31′04″N 0°05′21″W

A statue of the English Romantic poet John Keats is located in Moorfields, Moorgate in the City of London. It was sculpted by Martin Jennings and depicts a larger than life-size copy of a life mask of Keats taken aged 21. Keats was the son of an ostler at the nearby inn, The Swan and Hoop. It was unveiled by Michael Mainelli, the Lord Mayor of London, on 31 October 2024, the 229th anniversary of Keats' birth.

The circular base of slate around the plinth is inscribed with a quote from the fifth stanza of Keats' 1819 Ode on Indolence:

My sleep had been embroider'd with dim dreams;
My soul had been a lawn besprinkled o'er
With flowers.

It was funded by Alderman Bob Hall who had previously funded the John Donne Memorial near St Paul's Cathedral.
