= Coldstones Quarry =

Quarry in North Yorkshire, England

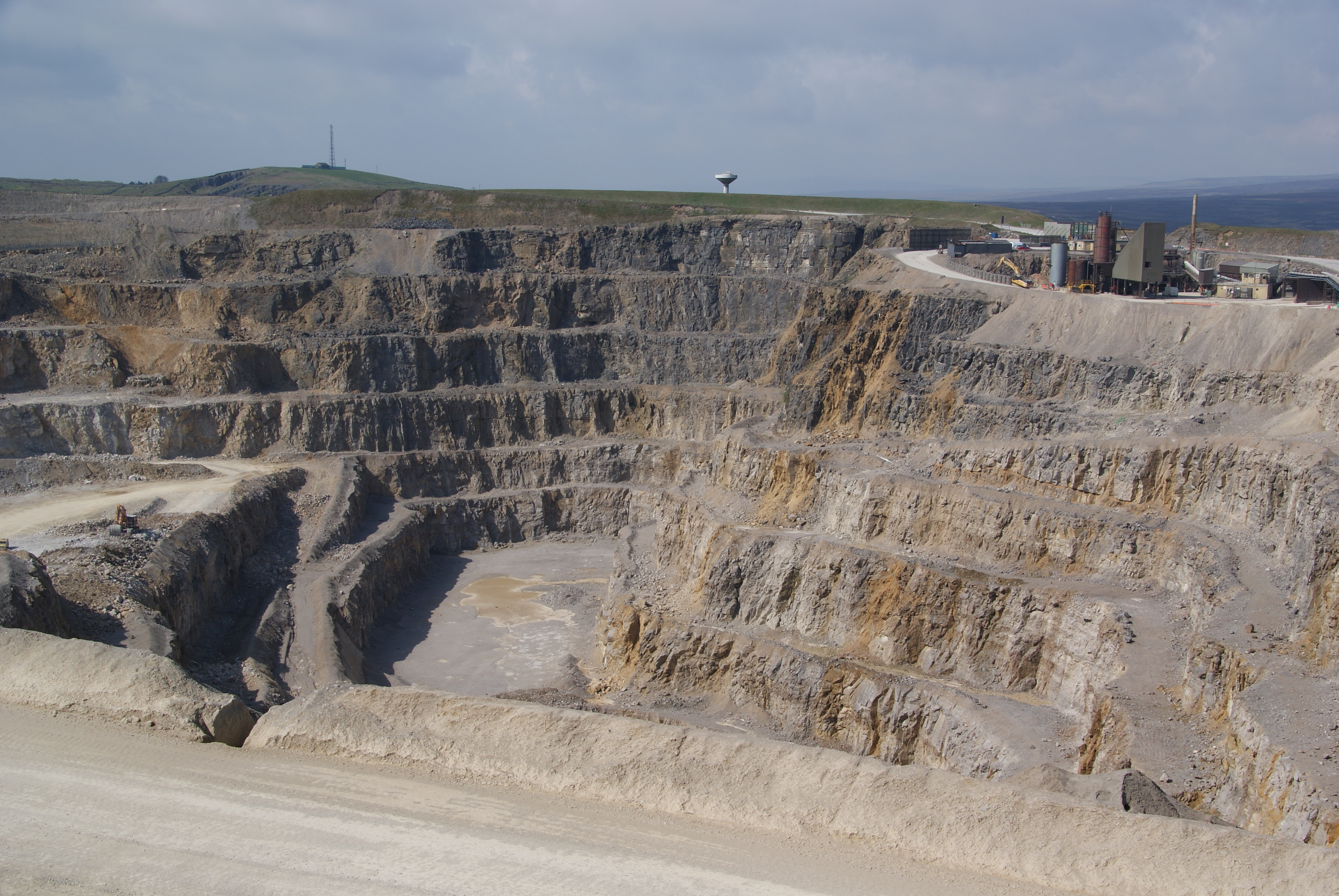
- Coldstones Quarry
- Interactive map of Coldstones Quarry
- Location: Greenhow, North Yorkshire, England; 54.07250°N 1.81333°W
- Products: Limestone
- Production: 500,000 tonnes (550,000 tons)
- Financial year: 2021–2022
- Type: Quarry
- Opened: c. 1800
- Active: 1800 – present
- Company: Heidelberg Materials
- Website: www.heidelbergmaterials.co.uk/en/aggregates/pateley-bridge-quarry
- Acquired: 2007

Coldstones Quarry (sometimes called Pateley Bridge Quarry) is an active limestone quarry in Greenhow, North Yorkshire, England. Coldstones produces around 500,000 tonnes (550,000 tons) of limestone aggregate per year which is mostly used within Yorkshire for general or concreting aggregate. The quarry has been in operation since around 1800, with some dormant periods. Its elevation of around 400 metres (1,300 ft) above sea level makes it one of the highest quarries in Britain. The adjacent attraction to the east, the Coldstones Cut, is the highest public artwork in Yorkshire.

Operations at the site are expected to cease in 2032.

== History ==
Historically, the area around Coldstones Hill was worked for lead and barytes as well as limestone for converting into lime. Records and mapping shows that lime kilns were in existence where the quarry workings are today. The quarry was started c. 1800 and was one of many in the Grenhow area; Duck Street, Toft Gate and Greenhow Hill, but now Coldstones is the only active quarry in Nidderdale. Production at the quarry was increased to accommodate the need for materials to be used in new airfields being opened up across the Plain of York. Coldstones Quarry is located next to the village of Greenhow, on Bewerley Moor, in North Yorkshire, England. The quarry is 4 kilometres (2.5 mi) west of Pateley Bridge on the B6265 road, and some 300 metres (980 ft) away from the village of Greenhow. It is outside of the Yorkshire Dales National Park, but is within the Nidderdale AONB. The name Coldstones derives from the Old Norse Kalde - staines, which is a literal translation meaning cold stones.

The limestone band of the quarry is 13 metres (43 ft) thick, and its top contour point is at the 400 metres (1,300 ft) point, which makes it one of the highest quarries in Britain. However, because the quarry is below the contour line in the hill, it is not normally visible from the adjacent roads, though it can be seen from the Coldstones Cut visitor attraction. The Coldstones Cut visitor point is set at 420 metres (1,380 ft) above sea level.

The quarry was worked by hand until its re-opening 1929, where gelignite was used to loose the quarry faces and mechanization took over for crushing the rock. Permission to quarry for a further 55 years was granted in 1992, on the proviso that a new access road would be built so that lorries leaving the quarry would do so to the south and avoid the village of Greenhow. A significant amount of the product exported from the site uses this road and heads south along the B6541 to the A59 road, and thence on to either Leeds or Bradford for distribution. In the early part of the 19th century, lime and limestone was transported out of the quarry on pack horse, but the coming of the railways to Nidderdale, meant that products were taken to Pateley Bridge railway station (a short distance down the hill) to be exported by train. Despite an initial extension of 55 years in 1992, taking the site to 2047, the site is expected to stop quarrying in 2032.

The old kilns at Toft Gate are still extant, and are now listed as a scheduled monument.

=== Owners ===
- c. 1800 – 1892 unknown
- 1892 – 1902 Elisha Newbould
- 1902 – c. 1920s Henry Newbould
- The quarry closed for a few years (1926–1929), until the West Riding County Council became for responsible for maintaining roads, and so the quarry re-opened to meet new demand.
- 1929 – 1959 Nidderdale Quarries
- 1959 – 1982 The Yorkshire Brick Company ltd
- 1982 – 2000 Pioneer
- 2000 – 2023 Hanson
- 2023 – (present) Heidelberg Materials – Heidelberg had owned the Hanson brand since 2007, but rebranded to Heidelberg Materials in 2023

== Production ==
The quarry works the Hardraw Scar Limestone (which is the youngest rock in the Alston formation geologically speaking). Coldstones Quarry produces limestone which is used as aggregate, block stone, agricultural lime, and concreting aggregate, but other minerals such as barytes, and lead have been mined, or worked. Small amounts of fluorite have been discovered and when worked, this mineral was exported to Derbyshire for processing. Additionally, the quarry has small amounts of prosopite, doyleite and otavite, so far the only location in the United Kingdom where these minerals have been reported. Other minerals found here have been discovered in the Garnet Vein, which is about 2 metres (6 ft 7 in) deep and is on the southern side of the quarry, include aurichalcite, calcite, cinnabar, hemimorphite, cerussite, and smithsonite.

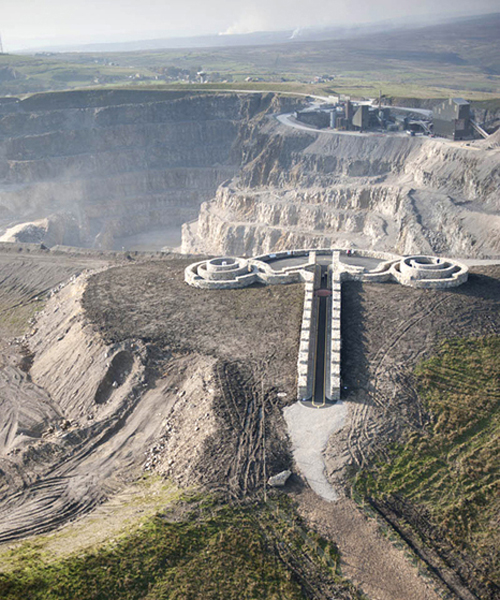
The Coldstones Cut

=== Production tonnages ===
Tonnages are expressed per year;

- 1900 – 140 tonnes (150 tons)
- 1905 – 900,000 tonnes (990,000 tons)
- 2005 – 800,000 tonnes (880,000 tons)
- 2010 – 750,000 tonnes (830,000 tons)
- 2022 – 500,000 tonnes (550,000 tons)

== Coldstones Cut ==
The Coldstones Cut was created by Andrew Sabin and allows visitors to walk through a corridor of limestone and enjoy views over the quarry and also into Nidderdale. The site cost £500,000 to create and used limestone slabs sourced from inside Coldstones Quarry itself. Funding for the project came from the Arts Council, Natural England and Yorkshire Forward, which is a regional development agency; Hanson Aggregates contributed their time and the stone to the project. The installation won the Marsh Award for Excellence in Public Sculpture in 2011.
