= Rise up, Women =

Bronze sculpture in St Peter's Square, Manchester depicting Emmeline Pankhurst

- 'Our Emmeline'
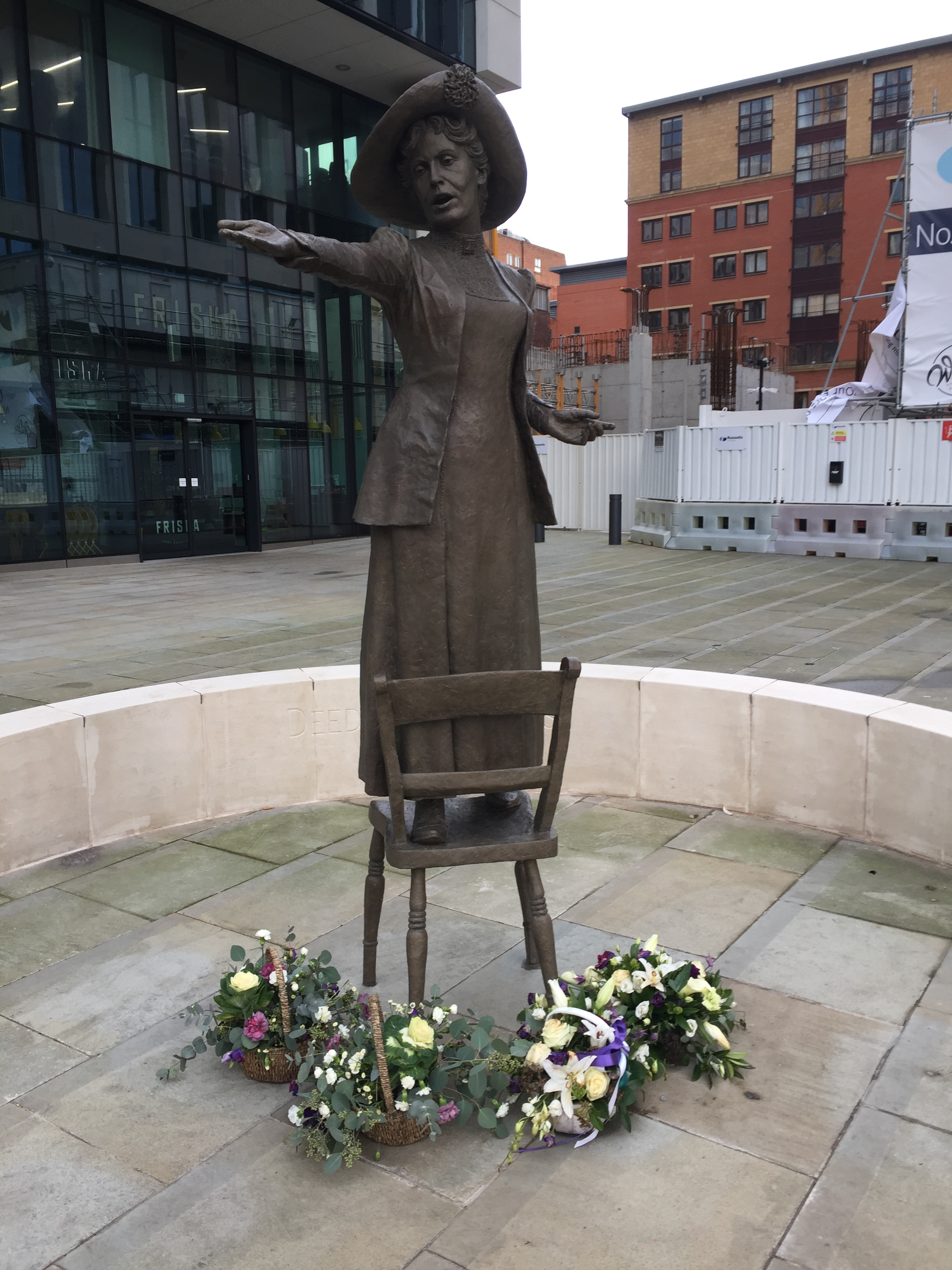

- Location in Greater Manchester
- Artist: Hazel Reeves
- Year: 2018
- Type: Bronze
- Location: St Peter's Square Manchester, M2 3AE United Kingdom; 53°28′40″N 2°14′35″W

Rise up, Women, also known as Our Emmeline, is a bronze statue of Emmeline Pankhurst in St Peter's Square, Manchester. Pankhurst was a British political activist and leader of the suffragette movement in the United Kingdom. Hazel Reeves sculpted the figure and designed the Meeting Circle that surrounds it.

The statue was unveiled on 14 December 2018, the centenary of the 1918 United Kingdom general election, the first election in the United Kingdom in which women over the age of 30 could vote. It is the first statue honouring a woman erected in Manchester since a statue of Queen Victoria was dedicated more than 100 years ago.

== The WoManchester Statue Project ==
The statue was created following a five-year campaign called the WoManchester Statue Project. This was led by Manchester City councillor Andrew Simcock. He had initiated the campaign following a meeting in March 2014 with his friend Anne-Marie Glennon in the Sculpture Hall in Manchester Town Hall. Over coffee she had commented "these (busts) are all men. Where are the women!"

Simcock's campaign was also inspired by a craftivism exhibition held at Manchester Town Hall during February and March 2014. Frustrated by the gender imbalance in Manchester's civic statues, Warp & Weft (artist Helen Davies and heritage researcher Jenny White) devised the statue project, yarn bombing eight male portrait busts with crochet masks depicting local historical women of achievement.

Councillor Simcock invited Warp & Weft to restage their exhibition on 30 July 2014, the day Manchester City Council gave its unanimous backing to his resolution that a 'statue of a woman of significance to Manchester' be created.

Initially a 20-strong list of women was compiled for consideration for the statue:

- Margaret Ashton (1856–1937): first female city councillor for Manchester
- Lydia Becker (1827–1890): suffragist, botanist and astronomer
- Louise Da-Cocodia (1934–2008): nurse and social campaigner
- Margaret Downes (d.1819): killed at the Peterloo Massacre
- Elizabeth Gaskell (1810–1865): novelist and social reformer
- Annie Horniman (1860–1937): theatre patron
- Sunny Lowry (1911–2008): English Channel swimmer
- Kathleen Ollerenshaw (1912–2014): mathematician, educationalist and Lord Mayor of Manchester
- Emmeline Pankhurst (1858–1928): leading suffragist
- Christabel Pankhurst (1880–1958): leading suffragist
- Sylvia Pankhurst (1882–1960): leading suffragist
- Mary Quaile: trade unionist
- Elizabeth Raffald (1733–1781): businesswoman and author
- Esther Roper (1868–1938): suffragist and trade unionist
- Enriqueta Rylands (1843–1908): founder of the John Rylands Library
- Olive Shapley (1910–1999): radio broadcaster
- Shena Simon (1883–1972): educationalist and political reformer
- Marie Stopes (1880–1958): birth control pioneer
- Ellen Wilkinson (1891–1947): MP and mental health campaigner
- Emily Williamson (1855–1936): co-founder of the RSPB

In June 2015, Simcock cycled from Land's End to John o' Groats in 20 stages, each one devoted to one of the women on the list.

A shortlist was created in the autumn of 2015 and Emmeline Pankhurst was decisively selected following a vote by thousands of people across the world.

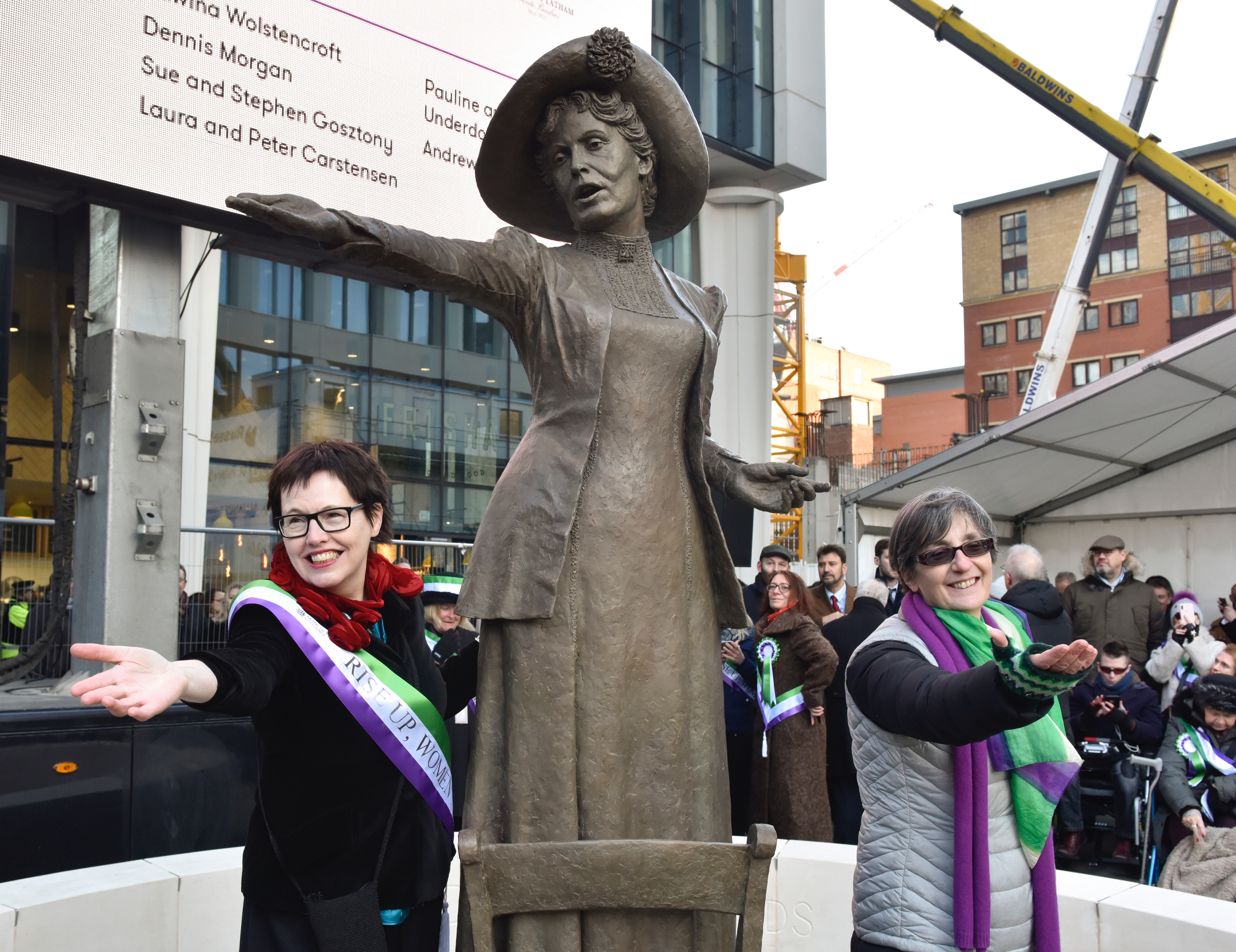
Sculptor Hazel Reeves and descendant Helen Pankhurst at the unveiling

The unveiling was attended by 6,000 people including many who had marched from the Pankhurst Centre near Manchester Royal Infirmary. It was here, as the then home of the Pankhurst family, that the Women's Social and Political Union had been formed.

The event marked exactly 100 years since the first women voted and stood as candidates in a general election. Two marches started from two symbolic locations – the People's History Museum and the Pankhurst Centre – ending up at St Peter's Square, which was attended by 6,000 people including 1,000 local schoolchildren. In July 2018, the Portland stone Pankhurst Meeting Circle was unveiled, designed to encircle the bronze statue.

The statue was funded by corporate sponsors Manchester Airport Group and Property Alliance Group and from the sale of a limited number of bronze maquettes of the statue. A significant donation also came from the Government's Centenary Fund (Centenary Cities).

=== First in the Fight ===
In November 2019, a book was published chronicling the history of the WoManchester Statue Campaign and the 20 women on the original long list for consideration. First in the Fight by Helen Antrobus and Andrew Simcock contains essays on all 20 women plus the history of the campaign.

=== Maintenance of the statue ===
The WoManchester Statue campaign specifically set out to raise money covering the maintenance of the statue.

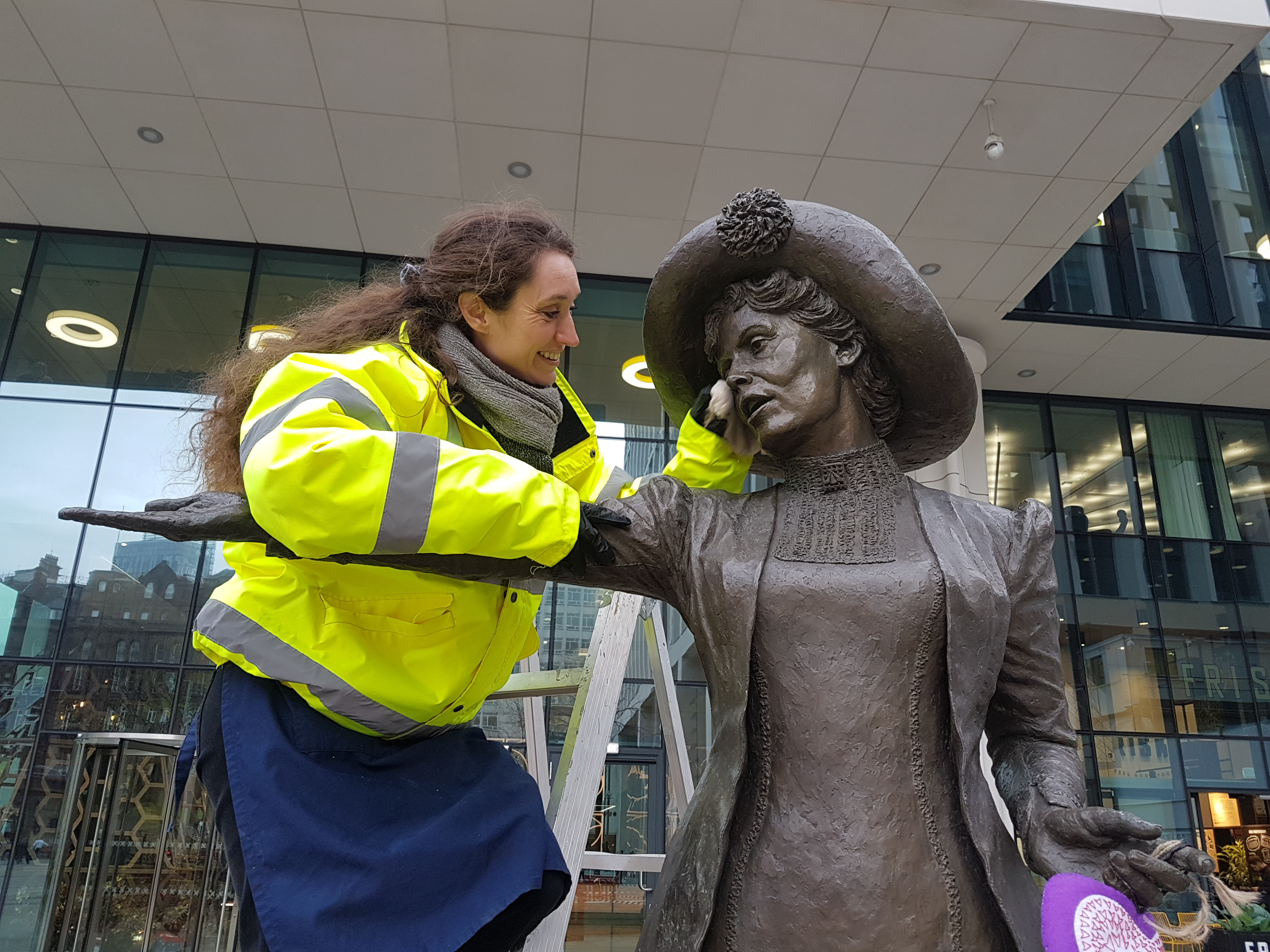
In December 2019, Lucy Branch from Antique Bronze Ltd cleaned and re-waxed the statue

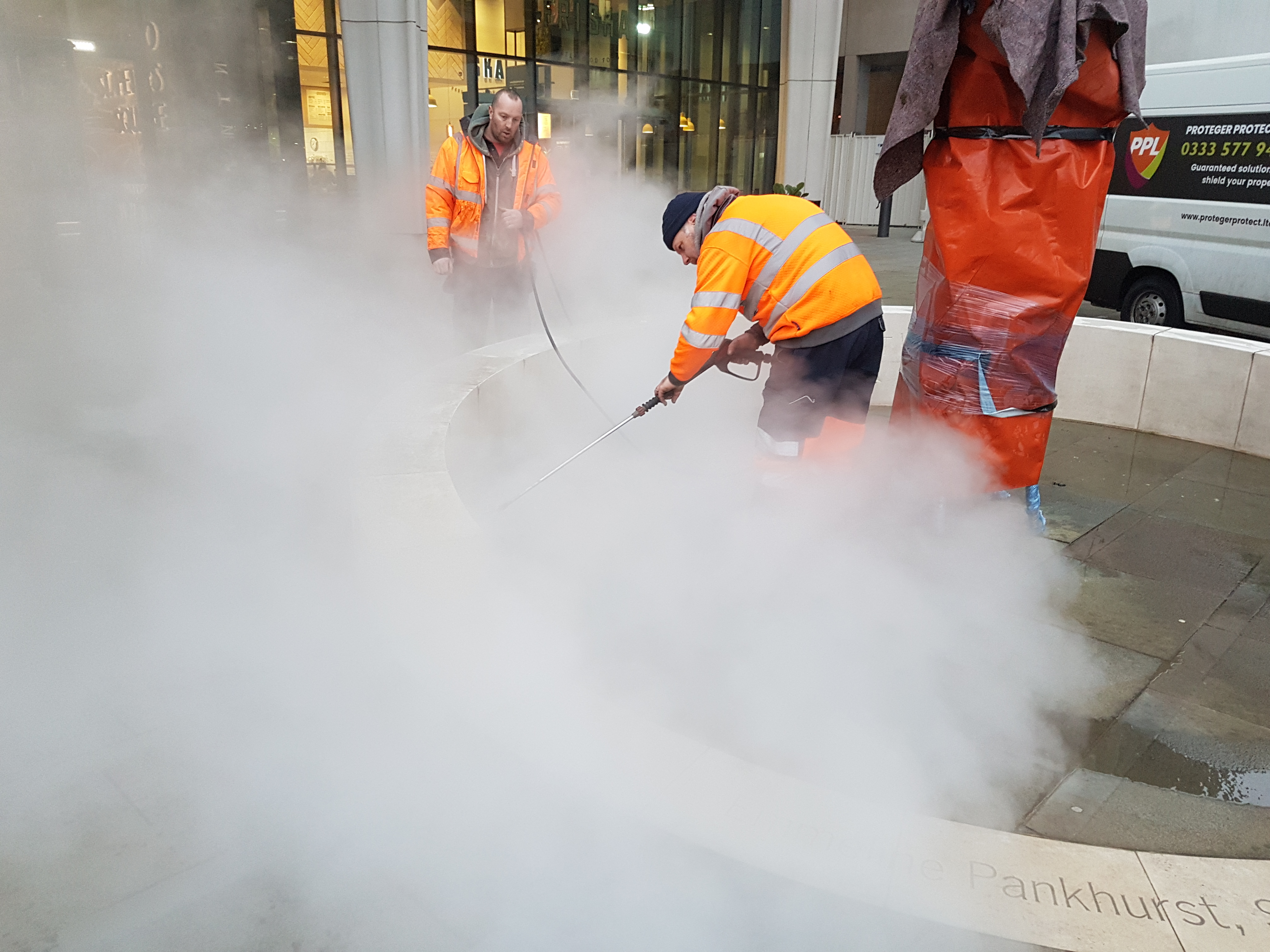
In February 2020, Jon Randles from Proteger Protect Ltd cleaned the meeting circle. Using the Doff system he removed the grime and algae with steam cleaning at 120 °C but critically operating at low pressure to avoid damage to the Portland stone

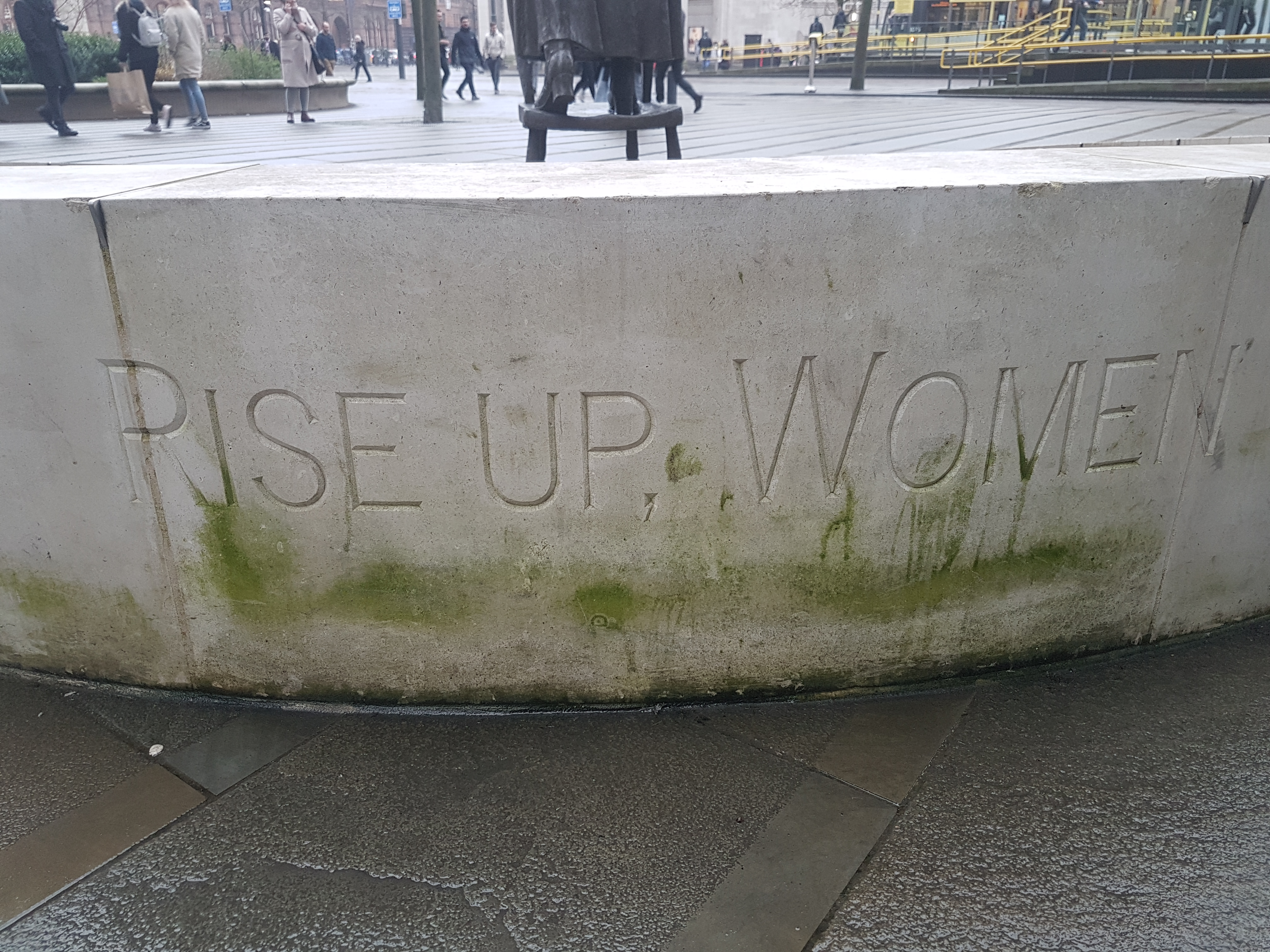
The Portland Stone meeting circle before cleaning

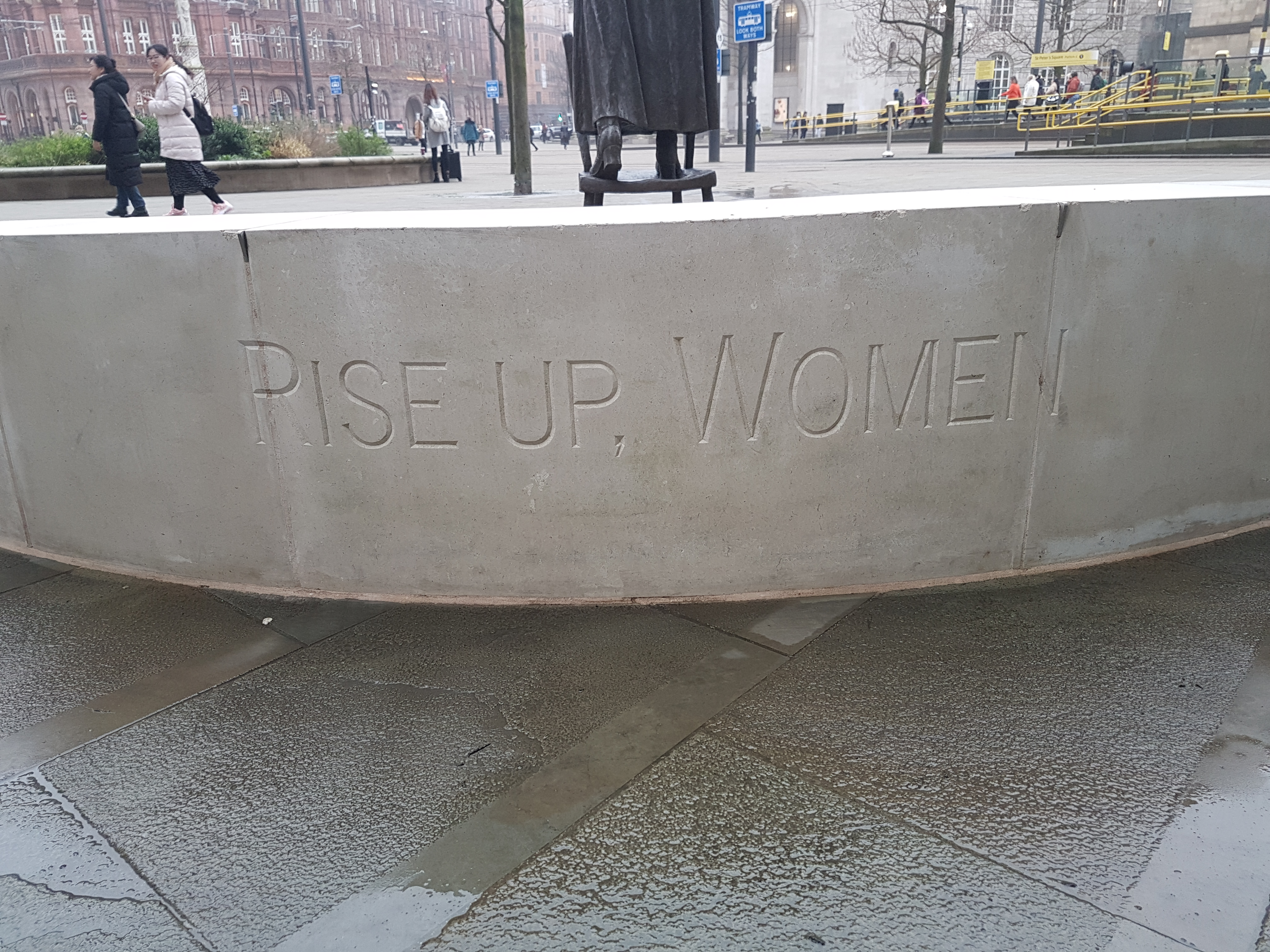
The Portland Stone meeting circle after cleaning

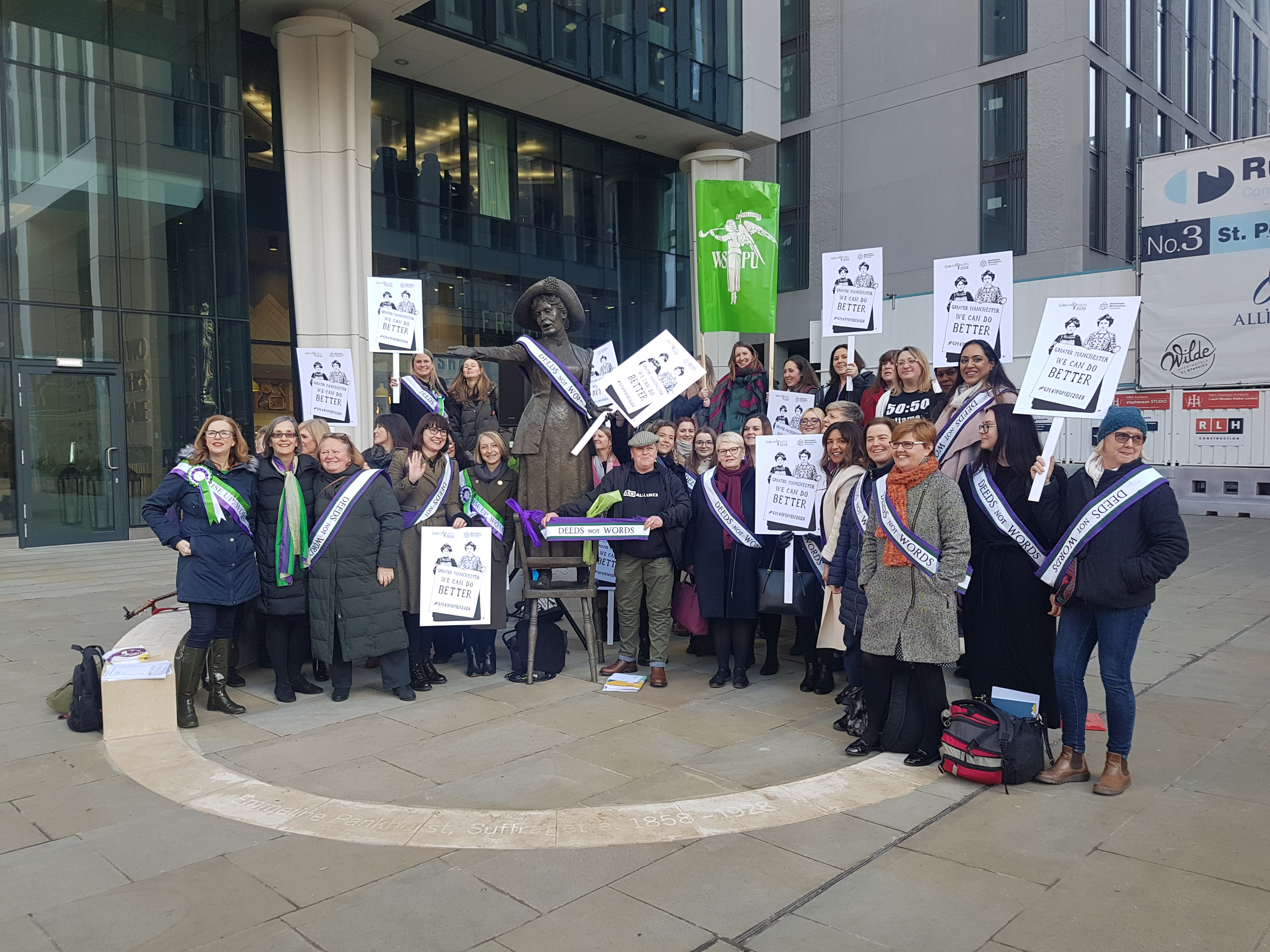
On 6 February 2020, the Gm4Women2028 campaign held a rally at the Emmeline Pankhurst statue

== Award ==
In 2021, the statue won the Public Statues and Sculpture Association (PSSA) Marsh Award for Excellence in Public Sculpture.

== See also ==
- List of monuments and memorials to women's suffrage
