= Scallop (sculpture) =

Sculpture by Maggi Hambling

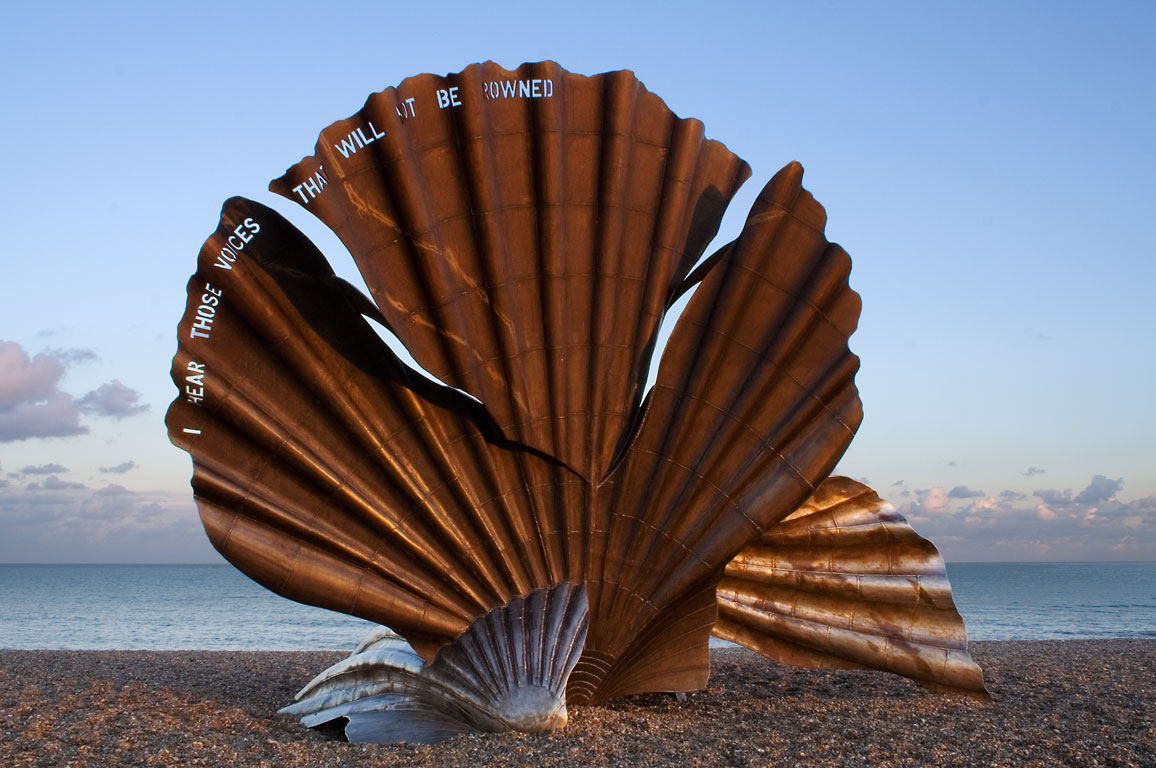
- Artist: Maggi Hambling
- Medium: Stainless steel
- Subject: Benjamin Britten
- Dimensions: 3.7 m (150 in)
- Weight: 3.5 tons
- Location: Aldeburgh, Suffolk; 52.16053°N 1.60587°E

Scallop is a 2003 work by British artist Maggi Hambling. It is located on Aldeburgh beach, Suffolk, in an Area of Outstanding Natural Beauty and is a tribute to composer Benjamin Britten.

== Creation and unveiling ==
Hambling commissioned local business J. T. Pegg & Sons LTD to create the sculpture. It is made from stainless steel and is 3.7 metres in height and weighs 3.5 tons, appearing as two halves of a fractured scallop shell. The sculpture bears a quotation in cut-out lettering from Benjamin Britten’s opera, Peter Grimes: "I hear those voices that will not be drowned".

Hambling was not paid for her time working on the sculpture and funded manufacturing costs with her own money and sales of her artwork. Hambling intended the piece to be interacted with, climbed on, sat on, "made love" under, and used as a shelter.

The sculpture was unveiled on Saturday 8 November 2003 by former culture secretary Chris Smith.

== Reception ==
Reaction to the sculpture was mixed. Scallop was named the best public sculpture in Britain and received the Marsh Award for Excellence in Public Sculpture in 2006. However negative criticism has arisen surrounding the sculpture’s position in an area of outstanding natural beauty with critics claiming that it has ruined views of the sea shore. Following the unveiling of the sculpture, some Aldeburgh residents formed a campaign group calling on Suffolk Coastal District Council to have the sculpture moved to another location. Hambling defended her sculpture as made “for that particular place in juxtaposition with the sea, and that is where I want it to stay.” The sculpture has been the target of vandalism.
