= List of winners of the Sir Hugh Casson Award =

The Sir Hugh Casson Award for the worst new building of the year was awarded annually from 1982 to 2017 by the "Nooks and Corners" column of the British satirical magazine Private Eye. The name ironically honours British architect Sir Hugh Casson. Column author Gavin Stamp (who wrote under the pseudonym "Piloti") explained in 2015 that "he [Casson] would turn up – take a fee – for giving evidence at public inquiries to recommend the demolition of buildings: a trade I despise". Stamp noted that Casson would sometimes mention his office as Vice-Chairman of The Victorian Society when arguing for the demolition of Victorian buildings. The drawing of the "medal" of the award uses a sketch of Casson which is a self-portrait.

Following Stamp's death in December 2017, although the "Nooks and Corners" column continued under a new author, the Sir Hugh Casson Award was discontinued.

== Winners ==
Year	Building	City	Architect	Comment	Reference
1982	Ismaili Centre	London	Casson, Conder and Partners	"lumpishness, banality, repetitiveness and repulsiveness of texture"	Eye 549 p. 7
1983	Fire Station, Shaftesbury Avenue	London	Richard Seifert and Partners	"It is tawdry fancy-dress architecture, without life or imagination"	Eye 575 p. 7
1984	Renault Centre	Swindon	Foster and Associates	"You can tell the Renault Centre is a whizzy High-Tech building because it is painted bright yellow"	Eye 602 p. 9
1985	Lloyd's building	London	Richard Rogers and Partners	"a great glazed grey warehouse ... how astonishingly naive it is as architecture"	Eye 627 p. 7
1986	Clore Gallery, Tate Britain	London	James Stirling	"a vast hole-in-the-wall entrance, a gratuitous neo-Constructivist unsupported corner"	Eye 653 p. 9
1987	Police Station at Buckingham Palace	London	Property Services Agency	"ugly, obtrusive, insensitive, banal"	Eye 679 p. 7
1988	Skylines Village, Isle of Dogs	London	Maxwell Hutchinson	"a 45-degree triangle on its side ... hyped-up mediocrity"	Eye 706 p. 9
1989	The Mound (Note: The award was for the remodelling of The Mound, to make a new public square.)	Edinburgh	Allies and Morrison	"a series of pointless, pretentious structures"	Eye 733 p. 9
1990	Concert Hall	Glasgow	Sir Leslie Martin	"a building which looks as if it was designed in 1950 in, say, Bulgaria"	Eye 757 p. 9
1991	Sainsbury Wing, National Gallery	London	Robert Venturi	"the elaborate and expensive camp joke"	Eye 784 p. 9
1992	United Kingdom pavilion, Expo '92 (Note: A temporary building, demolished in the year it was built.)	Seville	Nicholas Grimshaw	"a showy, pretentious exterior with nothing behind it"	Eye 810 p. 11
1993	Maitland Robinson Library, Downing College	Cambridge	Quinlan Terry	"a gauche and vulgar essay in misunderstood Greek Classicism"	Eye 836 p. 7
1994	Principal's Lodgings, Harris Manchester College	Oxford	Peter Yiangou	"illiterate red-brick neo-Georgian"	Eye 862 p. 9
1995	Faculty of Law	Cambridge	Foster and Partners	"a long extruded half-cylinder of glass and stainless steel"	Eye 888 p. 7
1996	House for an Art Lover	Glasgow	Charles Rennie Mackintosh	"[an] unreal design by [a] long dead architect"	Eye 914 p. 12
1997	Scottish Exhibition and Conference Centre	Glasgow	Foster and Partners	"a triumphant betrayal of all that modern architecture was meant to stand for"	Eye 940 p. 9
1998	Buchanan Galleries	Glasgow	Legge Ericsson, Jenkins and Marr	"a triumph of barbarism, vulgarity, ineptitude"	Eye 967 p. 9
1999	Millennium Dome	London	Richard Rogers and Partners	"a huge circular plastic tent ... [an] extravagant, vapid toy"	Eye 992 p. 17
2000	Falkland Islands Memorial Chapel, Pangbourne College	Pangbourne	Crispin Wride Architectural Design Studio	"so very like the Ruskin Library that its 'architects' are obviously shameless"	Eye 1018 p. 9
2001	The Forum	Norwich	Michael Hopkins and Partners	"all entrance ... a huge and crude building"	Eye 1045 p. 12
2002	Extension to City Art Gallery	Manchester	Michael Hopkins and Partners	"the splendid and really beautiful interiors of the original building .. have been gratuitously spoiled"	Eye 1070 p. 12
2003	Juxon House, Paternoster Square	London	William Whitfield	"an overdone embarrassing compromise, a dog's dinner"	Eye 1097 p. 15
2004	Scottish Parliament Building (Note: This building uniquely won the Stirling Prize for excellence in architecture in the same year.)	Edinburgh	Enric Miralles	"confused and confusing mish-mash of upturned boats and leaflike forms"	Eye 1122 p. 12
2005	Monument to the Women of World War II	London	John W. Mills	"crude and inept ... from a distance, the memorial becomes an incoherent dark lump, formless and inelegant"	Eye 1149 p. 14
2006	Palestra, Blackfriars Road	London	SMC Alsop	"a giant gimmick that is also plain ugly"	Eye 1174 p. 14
2007	The Meeting Place statue, St Pancras station	London	Paul Day	"this tasteless creation"	Eye 1200 p. 14
2008	The Public	West Bromwich	Will Alsop	"a big box ... with no obvious entrances"	Eye 1226 p. 12
2009	One Hyde Park (Note: Shortlisted for Building Design magazine's Carbuncle Cup in 2011.)	London	Rogers Stirk Harbour + Partners	"an overweening (half-empty) ... masterpiece"	Eye 1252 p. 15
2010	One New Change	London	Jean Nouvel	"on this crucial, prominent site, Nouvel's incoherent, solipsistic glazed lump is an insult to St Paul's"	Eye 1278 p. 14
2011	Museum of Liverpool	Liverpool	3XN and AEW Architects	"a cheap rip-off of [ Zaha Hadid's ] Deconstructivist style"	Eye 1304 p. 12
2012	RAF Bomber Command Memorial	London	Liam O'Connor	"pompous, self-regarding and triumphalist"	Eye 1330 p. 12
2013 (Note: The column notes that there were two "conspicuous front-runners" for the award, mentioning first the "Walkie-Talkie" (20 Fenchurch Street, by Rafael Viñoly). Column author Gavin Stamp subsequently said that the Walkie-Talkie was the winner of the award for 2013, as for instance in Eye 1408 p. 21; however the column in 2013 states "The winner this year, however, must be ... the restaurant attached to the new Serpentine Sackler Gallery".)	Restaurant at the Serpentine Sackler Gallery	London	Zaha Hadid Architects	"as incoherent as it is exhibitionistic"	Eye 1356 p. 8
2014	Reid Building, Glasgow School of Art	Glasgow	Steven Holl Architects	"crude and insufferably arrogant essay in minimalist neo-modernism"	Eye 1382 p. 18
2015	Investcorp Building, St Antony's College, Oxford	Oxford	Zaha Hadid Architects	"a long, curved, metallic thing like a big shiny slug"	Eye 1408 p. 21
2016	NEO Bankside and The Switch House	London	Rogers Stirk Harbour + Partners and Herzog & de Meuron	"ragged, discordant and rather incoherent in both surface modelling and overall form", "new, discordant brickwork"	Eye 1434 p. 20
2017	Statue of George Orwell, Broadcasting House	London	Martin Jennings	"The great man is depicted holding a fag, dressed in a crumpled suit and standing like a music hall artist about to crack a joke. The plinth is pathetic"	Eye 1460 p. 20
