= Tim Shaw (sculptor) =

Northern Irish artist (born 1964)

Tim Shaw, RA
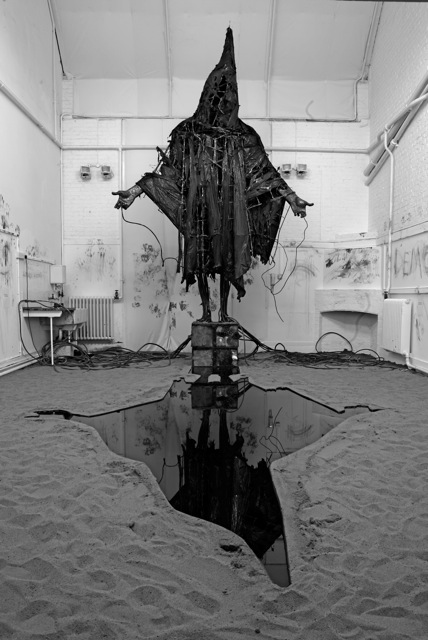
- Casting A Dark Democracy
- Born: 7 August 1964 (age 61); Belfast
- Education: Falmouth School of Art
- Known for: Sculpture, contemporary visual art

Tim Shaw RA (born 1964) is a Belfast-born sculptor and contemporary visual artist working in Cornwall UK. Tim Shaw was elected to be a Royal Academician in 2013 and won the Jack Goldhill Award for Sculpture at The Royal Academy of Arts Summer Exhibition in 2015.

== Education ==
Tim Shaw completed an art foundation course at Manchester Polytechnic and then a BA (Hons) Fine Art degree at Falmouth University.

== Major works ==
In 2009 Shaw's sculpture Middle World was shortlisted for the Threadneedle Prize. From 2000 to 2004, Shaw was also working on a commission from The Eden Project for an installation that would span the entire vine exhibit in the Mediterranean Biome. One of the figures originally intended for this installation was held back at the time due to concerns that it would be found too controversial. These fears were seen to have some foundations when Shaw's 2007 version of the figure, a three-metre high, "naked, portly, and proudly erect" rendering of Silenus, was attacked during its exhibition in a Vyner Street gallery in London's East End by a man wielding an iron bar, shouting "You're worshiping the wrong God!".

The influence of myth, seen in Shaw's early work, is once again present in his 2008 sculpture, Minotaur, a piece that was commissioned to mark the opening of Harrison Birtwistle's Opera, The Minotaur. After this, however, the more political side to his work becomes increasingly evident with a number of sculptures responding to issues such as terrorism and the war in Iraq. At this time Shaw was working in London as a Fellow sculptor at the Kenneth Armitage Foundation. The main works he produced during this 2006 to 2008 residency were Man on Fire: What God of Love Inspires Such Hate in the Hearts of Men, Tank on Fire (awarded the selectors' choice Threadneedle prize in 2008), and the multi-sensory installation Casting a Dark Democracy – Shaw's haunting response to the now infamous image of the Abu Ghraib prisoner, described as "one of too few works to engage unequivocally with the reality and human cost of the Iraq war."

A bronze cast of Man on Fire was installed outside the Imperial War Museum North, and received the 2024 Marsh Award for Excellence in Public Sculpture.

== Public and private commissions ==
- Drummer (2009–11), Lemon Quay, Truro, Cornwall.
- The Minotaur (2008), The Royal Opera House, Bow Street, London.
- Rites of Dionysus (2000–4), The Eden Project, Cornwall.

== Awards and prizes ==
- The Jack Goldhill Award for Sculpture at The Royal Academy Summer Exhibition (2015).
- Threadneedle Prize Shortlist (2009), Mall Galleries
- FBA Selectors' Choice Prize: Threadneedle Prize (2008), Mall Galleries
- Kenneth Armitage Sculpture Fellowship (2006)
- The Mullan Prize (2005), Royal Ulster Academy Annual Exhibition
- Prince of Wales Bursary (2005), The British School at Athens
- Millfield Summer Open Exhibition (2003), – First Prize
- Discerning Eye (1997), Mall Galleries – Prize Winner
- Delfina Studio Trust Award (1996)
