= Nigel Boonham =

English sculptor

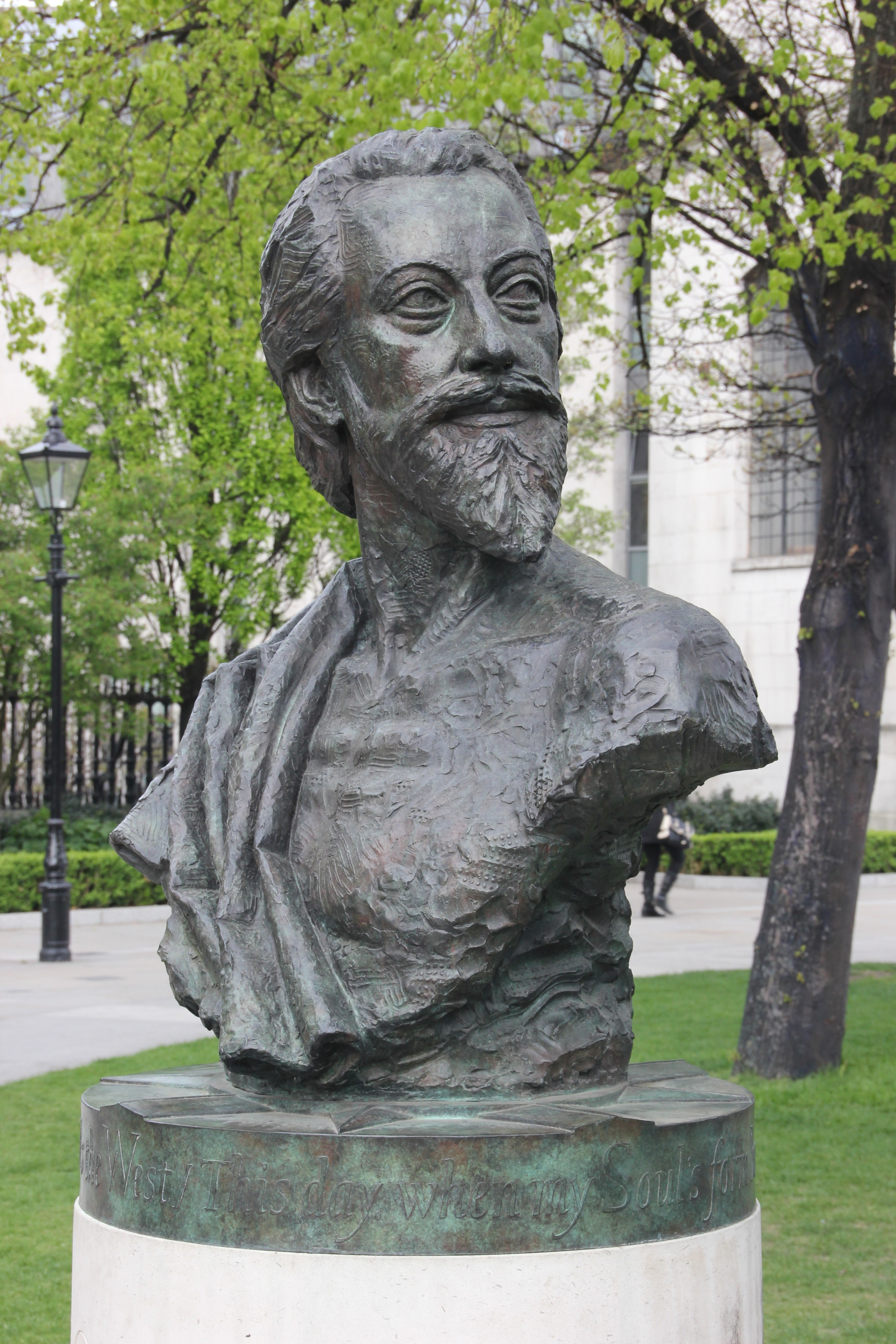
Boonham's bust of John Donne

Nigel Boonham (born 1953) is a British sculptor known mainly for his portrait sculptures.

== Career ==
Boonham trained under John Ravera from 1973 to 1977 followed by working as assistant to Oscar Nemon from 1977 to 1979. From the 1970s, he exhibited at the Royal Academy Summer Exhibition.

Boonham was a fellow of the Royal Society of Sculptors. He also served as vice president of the Society of Portrait Sculptors and was elected president in 2004.

== Works ==
Among Boonham's works is his John Donne Memorial in the grounds of St Paul's Cathedral in London. It was presented as a gift by Bob Hall to the City of London Corporation of which he was formerly an alderman. Boonham also provided a statue of Martin Luther King Jr. for Newcastle University, and a portrait of Princess Diana which she unveiled at the National Hospital of Neurology.
