= The Spectrum Building =

Building in Swindon, England

Renault Centre
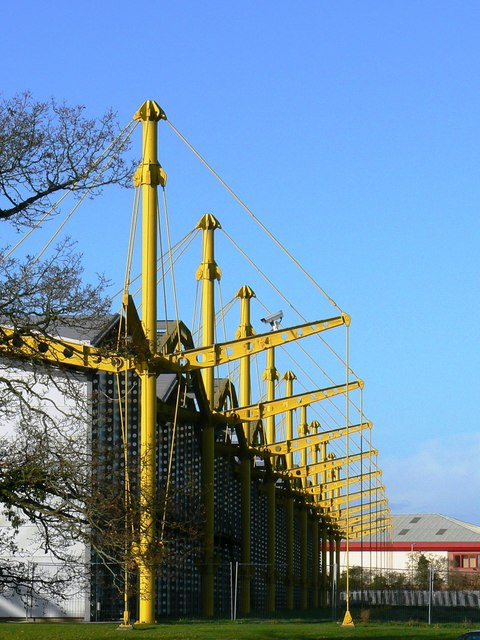
- Interactive map of the Renault Centre area
- Former names: Renault Distribution Centre (until 2001)
- Alternative names: The Spectrum Building (from 2001)

General information
- Architectural style: Structural expressionism
- Location: Rivermead Industrial Estate, Westlea, West Swindon, Swindon, UK
- Coordinates: 51.5669°N 1.8243°W
- Groundbreaking: 27 July 1981
- Completed: December 1982
- Cost: £8,266,400 (1983 price)
- Client: Renault

Height
- Height: 10 m (33 ft)

Technical details
- Size: 288m x 96m
- Floor area: 58,500 m2
- Grounds: 16 acres

Design and construction
- Architecture firm: Foster Associates
- Quantity surveyor: Davis Belfield Everest
- Main contractor: Bovis Construction
- Designations: Grade II* listed

The Spectrum Building (formerly the Renault Distribution Centre) is a high tech building in Swindon, England, commissioned by the French car company Renault for their UK operations. Designed by the British architect Norman Foster of Foster Associates, it opened in 1982.

Renault moved out in 2001, and since then it has been known as The Spectrum Building. It was listed Grade II* by English Heritage in 2013.

In 2025, the building was converted into an arsenal factory operated by the Portuguese military-industrial corporation Tekever for the production of unmanned aerial vehicles.

== Design ==
The architecture expressed not only the corporate ownership, through the yellow of Renault used on all the structural elements, but also promoted a modern statement on industrial relations by using the same roof over the warehouse and offices, making no distinction between white- and blue-collar workers. The cable-stayed steel structural system provides a 24m column-clear zone, with the columns being of only 450mm diameter.

Renault commissioned the building in 1980 after outgrowing their premises in Reading. Planning permission was granted in June 1981, construction commenced July 1981 and practical completion was achieved in December 1982.

The building won several awards in 1984 including the British Constructional Steelwork Association's Structural Steel Award, a Civic Trust Award and a Financial Times 'Architecture at Work' award. It also won Private Eye's Sir Hugh Casson Award for the worst new building of the year.

== History ==
In 1983, the building was officially opened by the French Minister of Consumer Affairs, Catherine Lalumière.

In 1985 the building featured in the James Bond film A View to a Kill.

The facility was closed in 2001 when Renault ended its operations in Swindon.

In 2013, the building was Grade II* listed by Historic England.

In late 2023, it was reported that the building would undergo a £4.7m renovation, funded by AEW Capital Management.

In September 2025, Minister of Defence John Healey announced that the site would be converted into a military drone manufacturing facility operated by Tekever, expected to open in 2026 as identified in the 2025 Strategic Defence Review.

Since 2022, the UK government has purchased over £270m of Tekever drones for the Armed Forces of Ukraine. The 254,000 square foot site would contain research and development offices, as well as a full production line. This follows Tekever's acquisition of the experimental airfield at ParcAberporth in Ceredigion, Wales. Production of Tekever AR3 and AR5 drones is planned. The nearby Yatesbury Airfield and the Science and Innovation Park in Wroughton would also be used for validation and test flights.
