= Hazel Reeves =

British sculptor

Hazel Reeves MRSS SWA
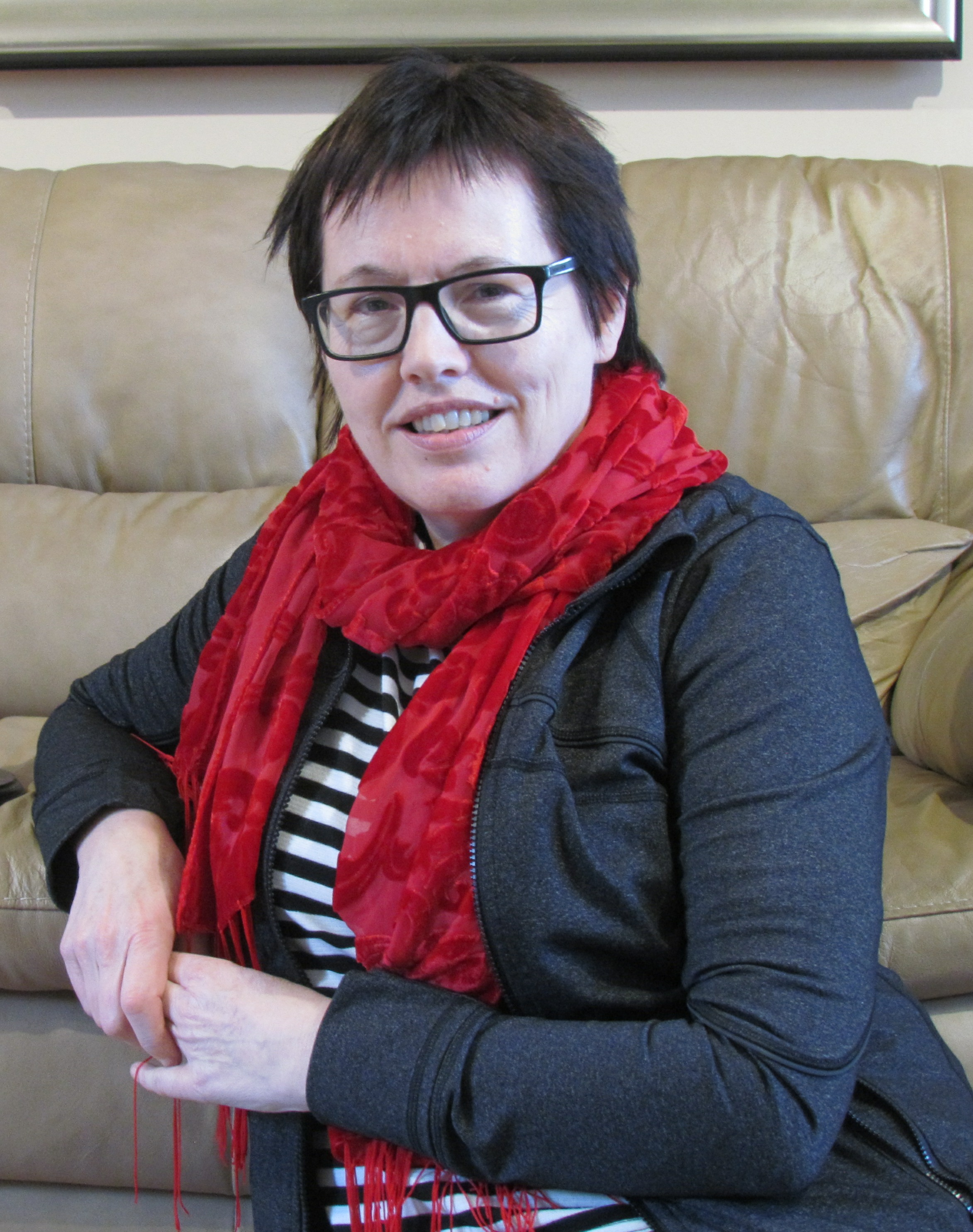
- Reeves in January 2019
- Born: Croydon, Surrey, UK
- Education: Imberhorne School, Sussex, UK; Kingston Business School, Surrey, UK; London School of Economics and Political Science, London, UK; University of Sussex, Sussex, UK; Heatherley School of Fine Art, London, UK; Art Academy, London, UK; Kingston University, Surrey, UK; Florence Academy of Art, Italy
- Known for: Sculpture
- Website: https://www.hazelreeves.com

Hazel Reeves, MRSS is a British sculptor based in Sussex, England, who specialises in figure and portrait commissions in bronze. Her work has been shown widely across England and Wales. Public commissions can be found in Carlisle, London, Congleton and Manchester. Since 2020, Reeves' work increasingly embraces soundscapes of nature and movement.

== Early life and education ==
Reeves was born in Croydon, Surrey and now lives in Brighton, East Sussex. She attended Imberhorne School in East Grinstead, West Sussex, Kingston Business School and the London School of Economics and Political Science (LSE) to study international development and gender equality MSc (Econ). In 2003 she studied sculpture with Sylvia MacRae Brown at the University of Sussex, at Heatherley School of Fine Art (London) and in 2009 at the Florence Academy of Art, Italy.

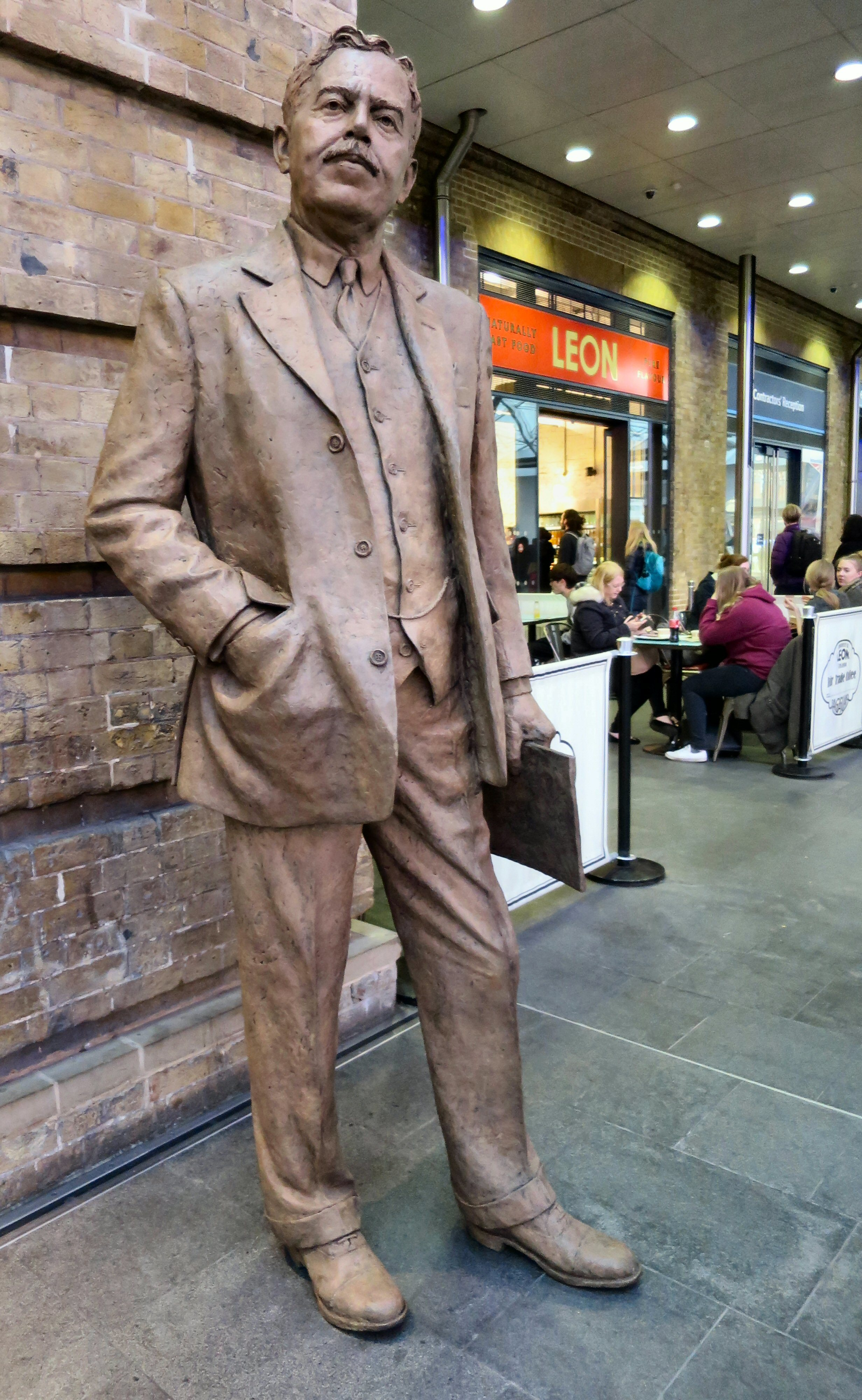
Statue of Sir Nigel Gresley by Hazel Reeves, King's Cross Station, London

== Career ==
Reeves' first quasi-public commission was of Sadako Sasaki for the Hedd Wen Peace Place, Llanfoist, Abergavenny, unveiled on the World Day of Peace, 21 September 2012. It tells the story of Sadako and her 1000 paper cranes, used worldwide in peace education.

The statue of Sir Nigel Gresley, designer of steam locomotives Flying Scotsman and Mallard, was Reeves' first major public commission. Her original design had included a mallard duck but it was removed after objections from two relatives who thought it was demeaning. The statue was unveiled at London King's Cross railway station on 6 April 2016, the 75th anniversary of his death.

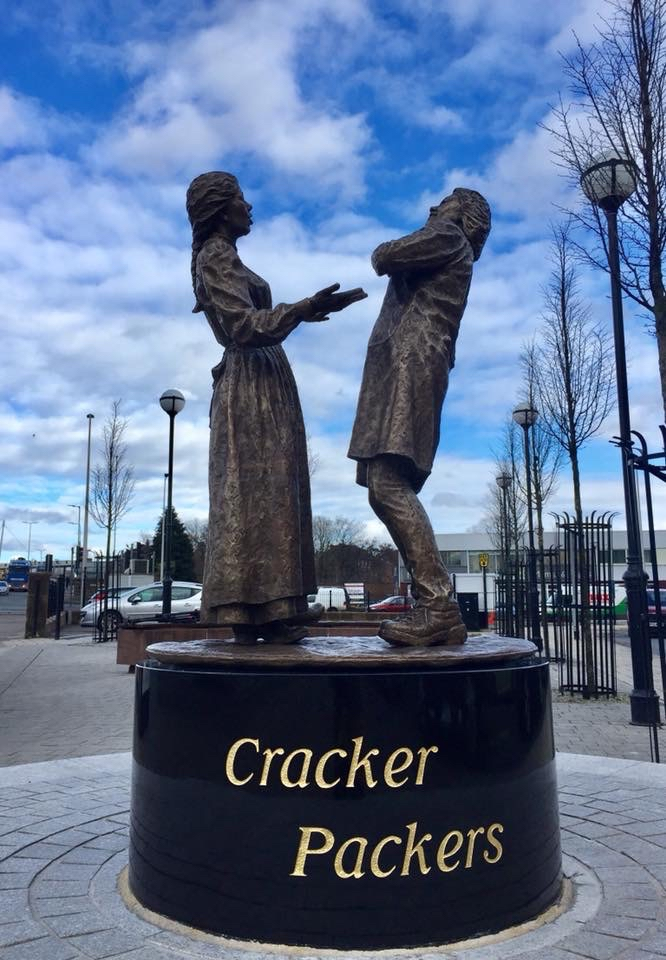
The Cracker Packers bronze statue by Hazel Reeves, Carlisle, 2018

On International Women's Day, 8 March 2018, Reeves' Cracker Packers statue was unveiled in Caldewgate, Carlisle, close to the pladis factory, where Carr's Table Water Biscuits are manufactured. The statue celebrates the lives of women biscuit factory workers from the Carr's factory in Carlisle. Based on former and current Cracker Packers the statue is of two women factory workers, one from the past and one from the present, standing atop a giant Carr's Table Water Biscuit. The statue was commissioned by Carlisle City Council and was one of hundreds that were nominated for Historic England's "Immortalised" season in 2018.

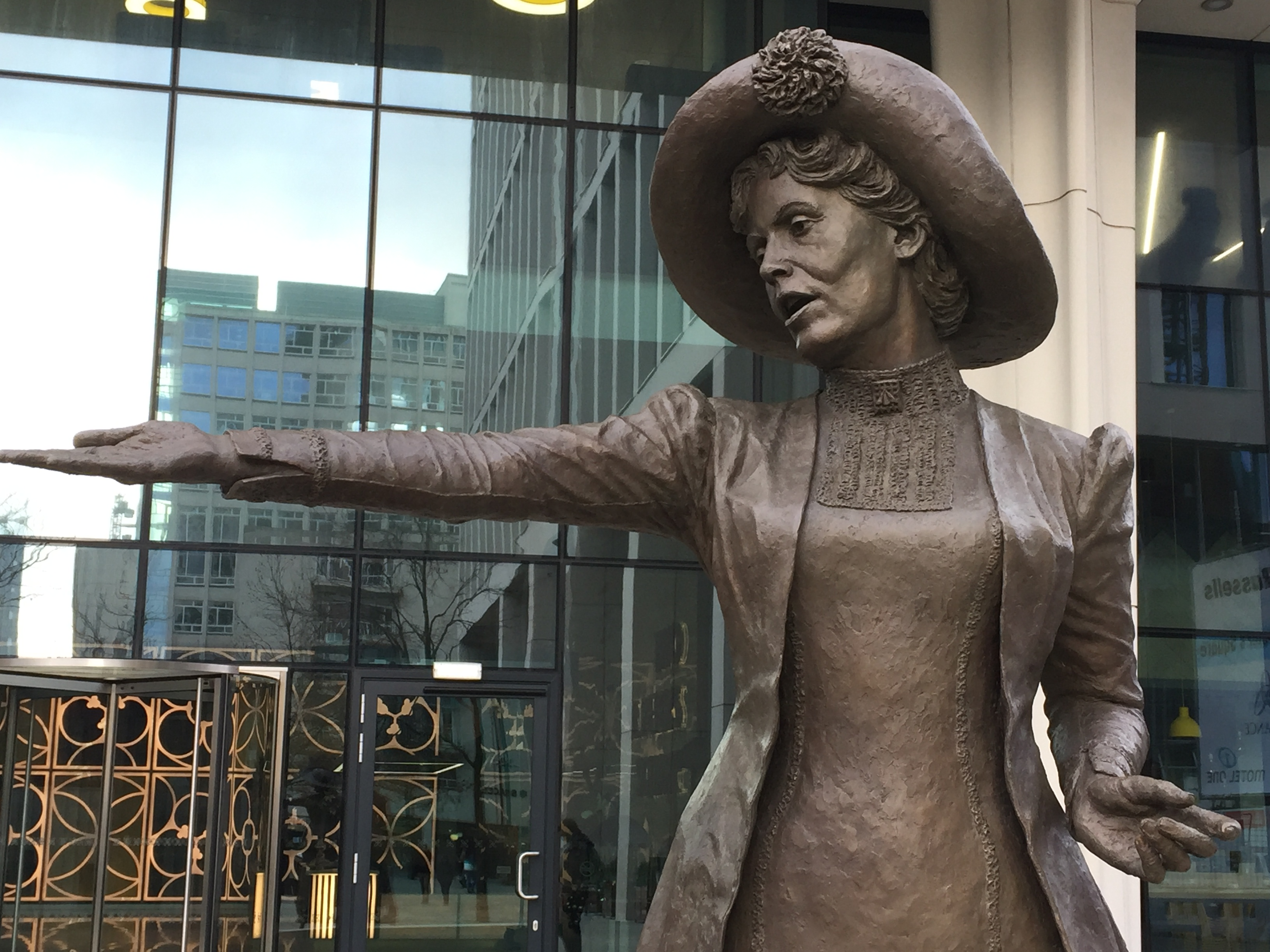
Rise Up, Women bronze statue of Emmeline Pankhurst by Reeves, Manchester, 2018

In 2017, Reeves' winning design – Rise up, Women – was selected from a shortlist of six designs for a bronze statue of Emmeline Pankhurst, by winning the public vote and being the unanimous choice of the WoManchester Statue Project selection panel. The statue of Emmeline Pankhurst was unveiled in St Peter's Square, Manchester (her hometown) on 14 December 2018. In 2021 it won the Public Statues and Sculpture Association (PSSA) Marsh Award for Excellence in Public Sculpture. In 2025, Reeves was appointed guest judge for these Awards.

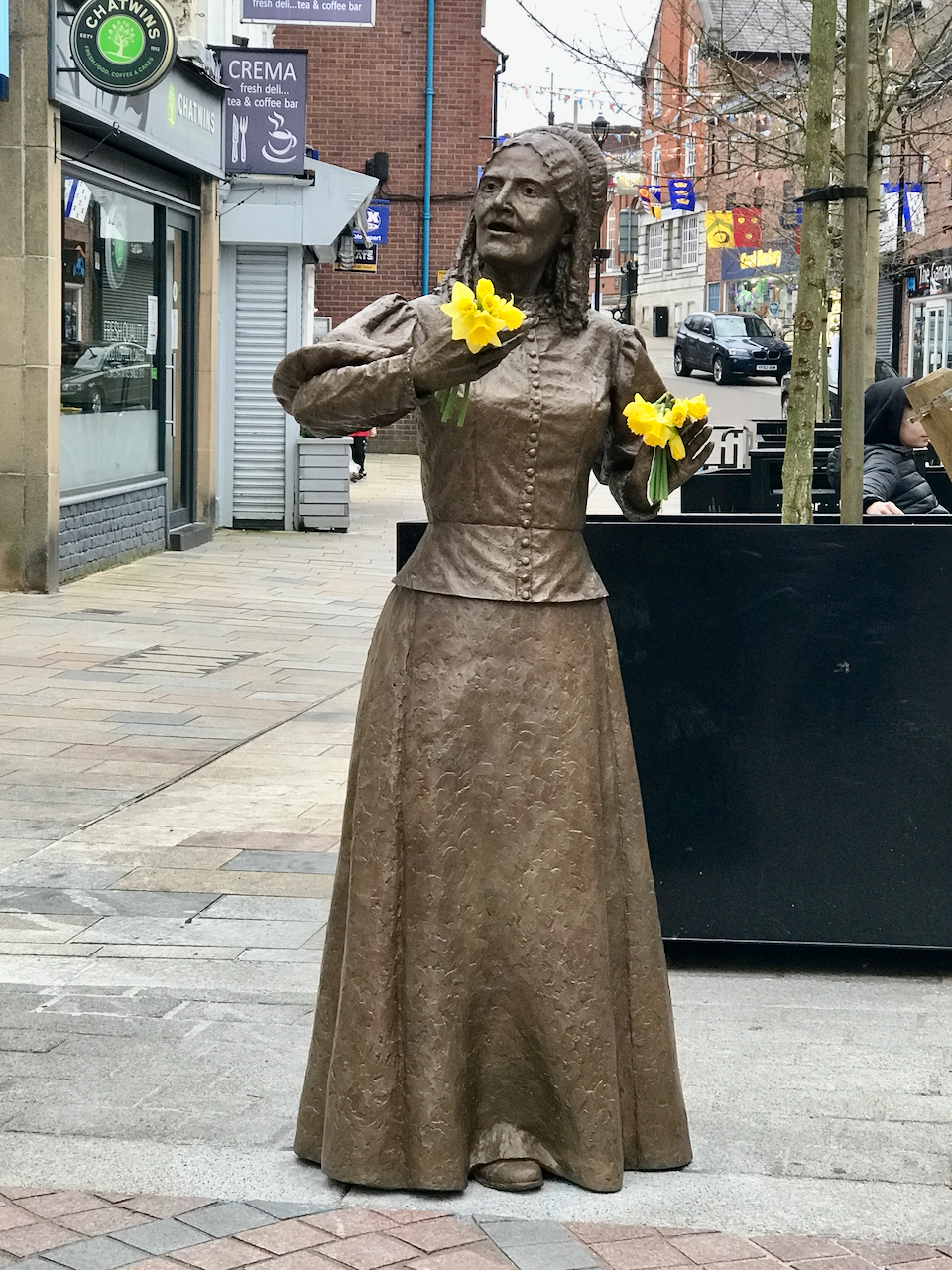
"Our Elizabeth" bronze statue of Elizabeth Wolstenholme Elmy by Reeves, Congleton, 2022

Reeves' statue of Elizabeth Wolstenholme Elmy (1833-1918), a pioneering activist who fought for equality throughout her life, was unveiled in Congleton by Baroness Hale of Richmond on International Women's Day, 8 March 2022.

Reeves seeks to redress the lack of representation of women in some of her public commissions as well as private commissions, such as portrait sculptures of disability rights activists Baroness Jane Campbell and Diane Kingston. Reeves has been appointed to sculpt Ada Nield Chew (1870-1945), the vocal factory worker who became a women's rights campaigner, for installation in Crewe. The 'Statue for Ada' campaign is coordinated by Cheshire Women's Collaboration and the sculptor has been engaging with the public to help design a maquette of the statue.

Sir John Manduell CBE, the Founding Principal who brought together two Manchester music schools to establish the Royal Northern College of Music (RNCM), was honoured in June 2024 with a new bust created by Hazel Reeves.

Increasingly Reeves records soundscapes from nature reserves and sites of rewilding - she is resident artist at Knepp Wildland - using this audio to enable people to feel connected to nature and each other.

Reeves' Sculptural Murmurings project at Fabrica Gallery, Brighton, was funded by the National Lottery through Arts Council England, who funded Reeves' Soundscapes of Hope project, drawing on her field recordings at Knepp and the nature reserves of Svartådalan, Sweden. Two sound events resulted: Layback with Nature (Phoenix Art Space, Brighton) and Sculptural Murmurings (II) (Fabrica Gallery). In 2025, Reeves returned to Fabrica Gallery for Wild Grooves silent disco in collaboration with field recordist Axel Wild, founder of Sounding Wild.

Reeves worked with Pallant House Gallery on the project Moving with Nightingales, in collaboration with dancers Rosaria Gracia and KJ Mortimer, inspired by Maggi Hambling's exhibition Nightingale Night. These workshops feature Reeves' field recordings of nightingales from Knepp Wildland, which are also being acquired by the British Library Sound Archive and used by BBC Radio 4 Tweet of the Day programme.

In 2024, Reeves' collaborated with pianist and composer Damian Montagu on the track Knepp Dawn, released on 5 May 2024 to mark International Dawn Chorus Day. The track celebrates the dawn chorus in the Knepp scrubland that features bird species facing cataclysmic declines elsewhere, like the nightingale, turtle dove, cuckoo, white stork.

Moving further afield, in 2026 Reeves was awarded the Eilean Shona Residency, from the Royal Society of Sculptors, where she spent one month on this Hebridean Island exploring - through sound, sculpture and movement - what being a collaborator with nature means for her.

In 2026 the Environment Agency commissioned Reeves to record and create a soundscape of the future of Thorney Island as the Agency works with partners to create new habitats for wildlife - mudflats and salt marsh - and improve flood resilience.

Reeves is an elected member of the Royal Society of Sculptors (MRSS). She teaches portrait sculpture workshops at Art Junction in Billingshurst, Phoenix Brighton and Morley College (London).
