= Women of Steel =

Sculpture by Martin Jennings

Coordinates: 53°22′50″N 1°28′21″W

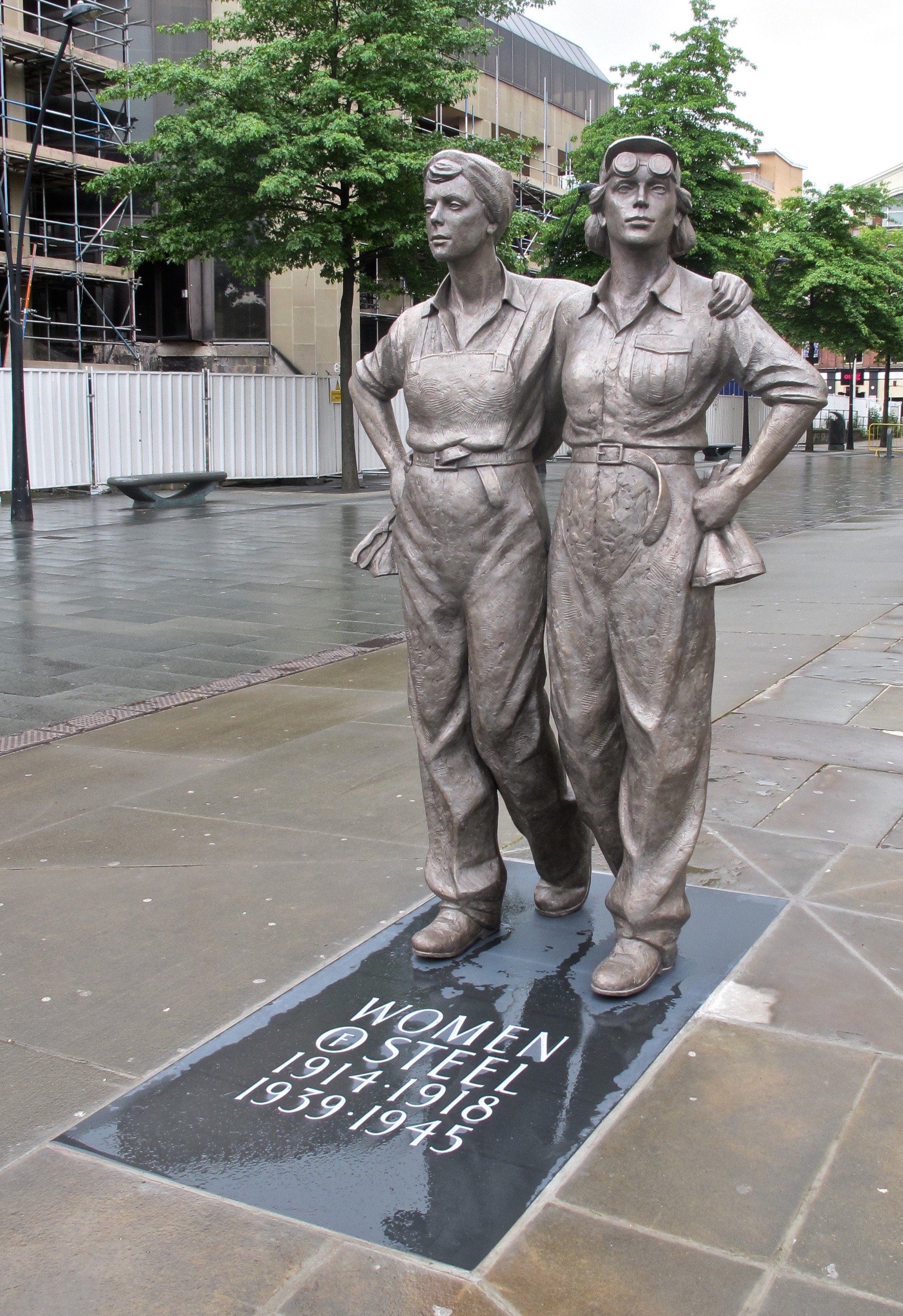
Women of Steel (2017), Barker's Pool, Sheffield

Women of Steel is a bronze sculpture that commemorates the women of Sheffield who worked in the city's steel industry during the First World War and Second World War. A work of the sculptor Martin Jennings, it was unveiled in June 2016. Women of Steel was given the Keith Hayman Award in the Sheffield Design Awards 2016 and the Public Monuments and Sculpture Association's 2017 Marsh Award for Excellence in Public Sculpture.

== Background ==
The sculpture was commissioned by Sheffield City Council. The project cost £150,000 of which £102,000 was paid for the sculpture. The unveiling was attended by 100 women who worked in the steelworks.

Additional money that was raised for the statue paid for medallions to commemorate the women who worked in Sheffield's steelworks during the world wars. The medallions were made by the Sheffield Assay Office, with 100 women having applied for them and 400 family members of deceased women steelworkers.
