= Martin Jennings =

British sculptor

Martin Jennings FRSS
- Born: 31 July 1957 (age 69); Arundel, West Sussex, England
- Occupation: Sculptor
- Notable work: Effigy of King Charles III for the Royal Mint
- Website: Official website

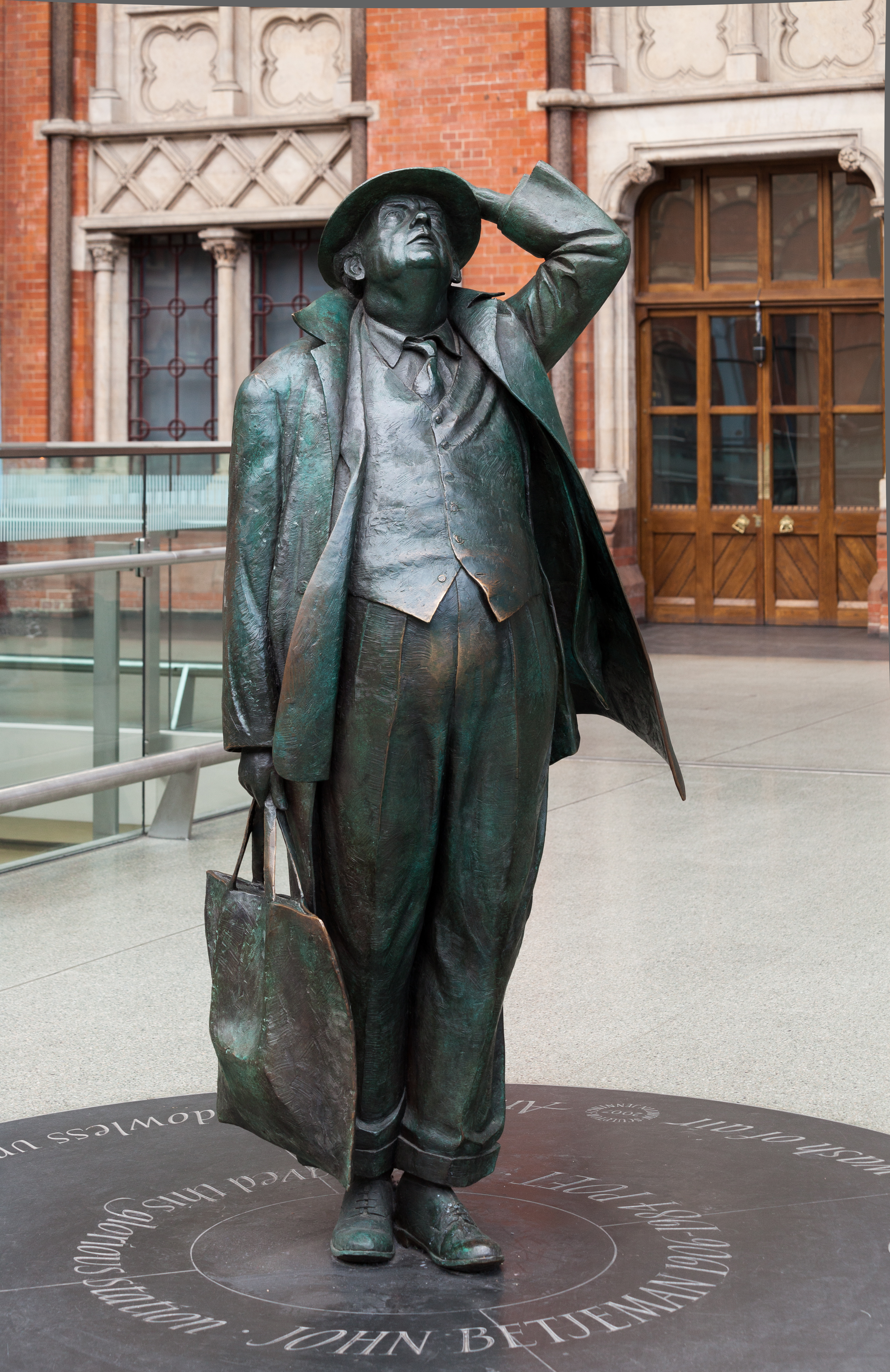
Statue of John Betjeman (2007), St Pancras railway station, London

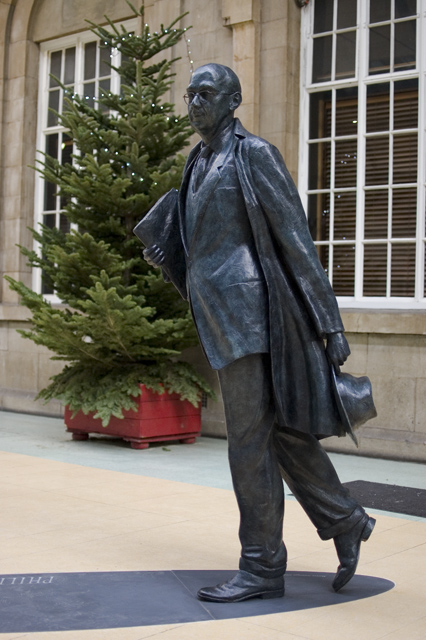
Philip Larkin (2007), Hull Paragon Interchange station

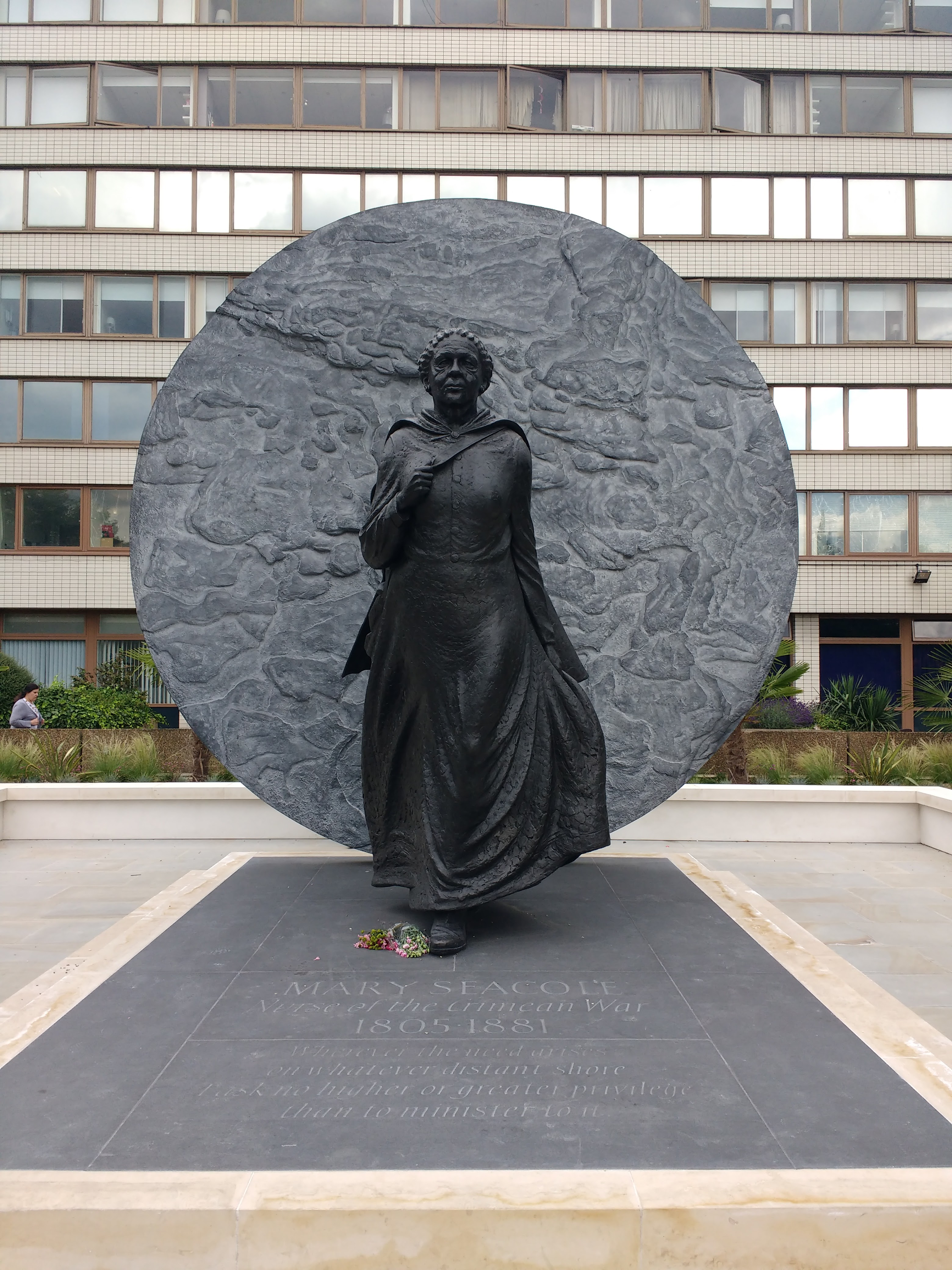
Statue of Mary Seacole (2016), St Thomas' Hospital, London

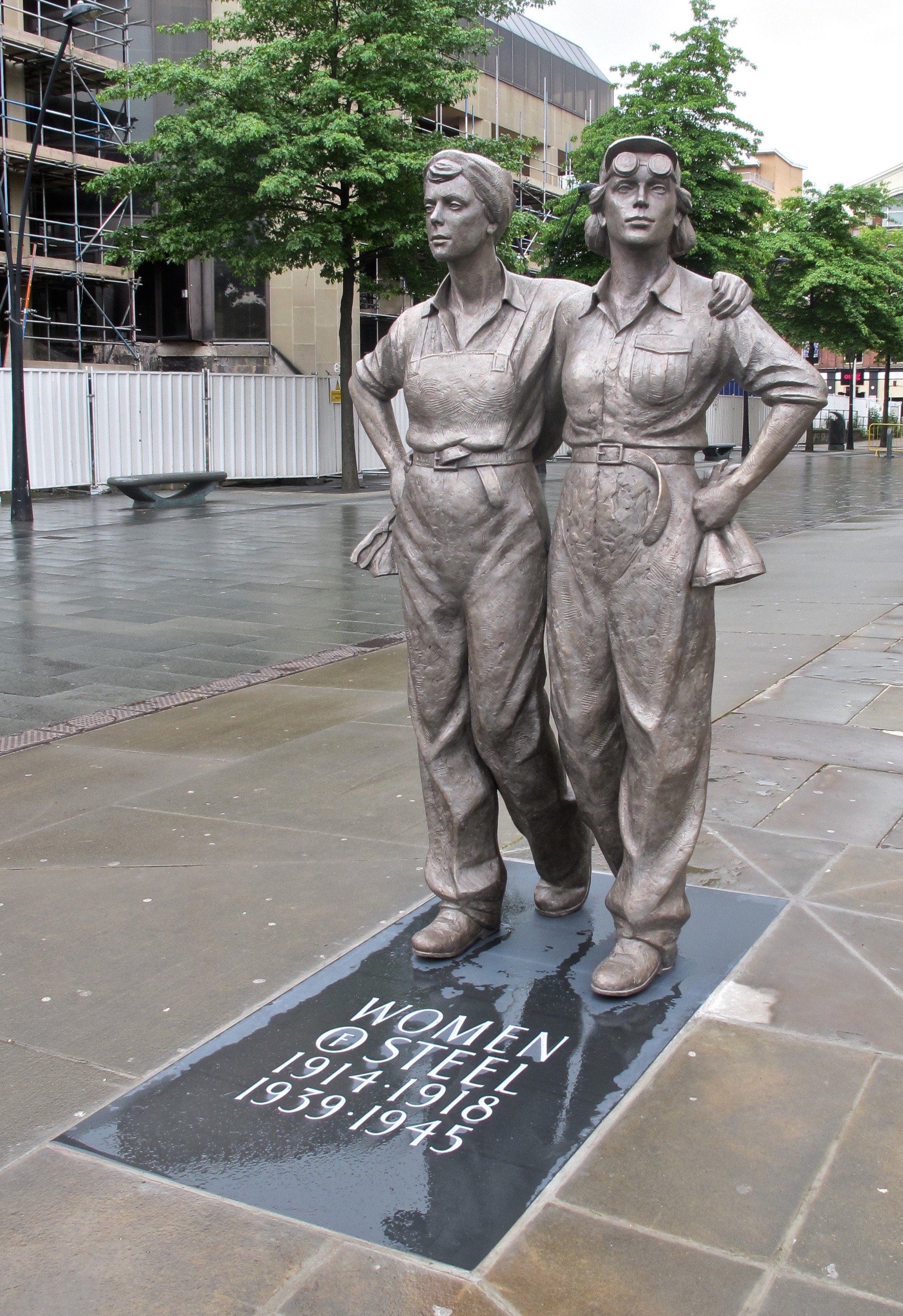
Women of Steel (2017), Barker's Pool, Sheffield

Martin Jennings (born 31 July 1957) is a British sculptor who works in the figurative tradition, in bronze and stone. His statue of John Betjeman at St Pancras railway station was unveiled in 2007 and the statue of Philip Larkin at Hull Paragon Interchange station was presented in 2010. His statue of Mary Seacole (2016), one of his largest works, stands in the grounds of St Thomas' Hospital in central London, looking over the Thames towards the Houses of Parliament.

== Early life ==
Jennings was born on 31 July 1957, in Arundel, West Sussex, England. In 1979 he received his honours degree in English Literature and Language at the University of Oxford, after which he took a City & Guilds of London Art School course in Lettering (1979–80). From 1980 to 1983 he was apprenticed to Richard Kindersley for architectural lettering.

== Notable works ==
Jennings created a bronze monument commemorating the pioneer plastic surgeon Sir Archibald McIndoe which was unveiled in June 2014 in the High Street, East Grinstead. Jennings' own father, Michael Jennings, a tank commander badly injured near Eindhoven in 1944, was treated for burns by McIndoe's team during the war. The monument depicts McIndoe standing behind and resting his hands reassuringly on the shoulders of a seated airman, who has burned hands clawed together, and a scarred face turned to one side. The figures are encircled by a stone bench.

Also in 2014, Jennings completed a bronze statue of Charles Dickens, which was unveiled in Guildhall Square, Portsmouth, the city of the author's birth.

In June 2016, two statues by Jennings were installed. The first paid tribute to the women who worked in the armaments industry during the Second World War and was sited in front of Sheffield's City Hall. For Women of Steel Jennings was given the Public Monuments and Sculpture Association's 2017 Marsh Award for Excellence in Public Sculpture. The second commemorated Crimean War nurse Mary Seacole and was sited in front of St Thomas' Hospital in London. Both of these were unveiled at a time when the paucity of monuments to women across the country was being publicly discussed. The making of the Jennings statue was recorded in the ITV documentary David Harewood: In the Shadow of Mary Seacole (2016) along with her life story.

In November 2017, Jennings' statue of George Orwell was unveiled outside Broadcasting House, headquarters of the BBC, in London. This won Jennings a second Marsh award – but also Private Eye's "Sir Hugh Casson Award" for 2017's ugliest new building [sic].

On 30 September 2022 the Royal Mint unveiled Jennings' design for the obverse face of the British coinage, for which he had modelled the effigy of King Charles III. A crowned version of the same effigy was used for a special edition issue at the time of the coronation in May 2023. Coins using the effigy have Jennings' initials under the monarch's neck. A "digitally re-lit" version of the portrait has been used by Royal Mail for the new stamps bearing the image of Charles III, the first time since the 1940s (and the George VI portrait by Humphrey Paget) where the same, unmodified effigy has featured on both coins and stamps.

Jennings' sculpture of the life mask of the 21-year-old John Keats was unveiled in Moorgate in the City of London in October 2024.

In September 2025, it was announced that Jennings had been chosen to create a statue of Queen Elizabeth II as part of a memorial to her in St James's Park, London.

His statue of Jane Austen was unveiled in The Close near Winchester Cathedral in October 2025.

== Work in public collections ==
The National Portrait Gallery in London has three portraits by Jennings: Edward Heath, Philip Pullman and Lord Bingham. A cast of his portrait bust of Sir Edward Heath stands outside the House of Commons in The Palace of Westminster. His bronze portrait bust of Queen Elizabeth the Queen Mother is exhibited in the crypt of St Paul's Cathedral. His maquette for a statue of John Radcliffe is in the collection of the Ashmolean Museum in Oxford.

== Portraits of Jennings ==
The National Portrait Gallery collection has a 2001 photographic portrait of Jennings by Norman McBeath.

== Personal life ==
Jennings is based in the Cotswolds, near Stroud. He is a Fellow of the Royal Society of Sculptors.

Preceded by Jody Clark	Coins of the pound sterling Obverse designer 2022	Succeeded by incumbent
