= Harlow Sculpture Town =

Sculpture collection in Harlow, Essex, England

Harlow Sculpture Town is a title used since 2009 to refer to the collection of over 90 public sculptures sited throughout the town of Harlow in the English county of Essex. This collection includes work by major international sculptors such as Auguste Rodin, Henry Moore, Elisabeth Frink and Barbara Hepworth, amongst others.

The collection has its foundation in the early days of the town itself, which is a former Mark 1 New Town built as part of a nationwide programme of post-war reconstruction. Harlow’s master planner Sir Frederick Gibberd was uncompromising in his vision that the town should be home not only to high quality housing, public amenities and expansive green spaces, but also to the finest works of art. He established Harlow Art Trust in 1953 with a mission to beautify Harlow by commissioning, siting and maintaining public art, and it has been in operation ever since.

The decision to refer to the sculpture collection as Harlow Sculpture Town was first proposed in 2008 by Michael Paraskos who was working at the time for the Harlow Arts Trust, which owns most of the public sculpture on show in Harlow. On the 26 March 2009 Harlow Council voted to approve a proposal made by the Trust to redesignate Harlow as 'Harlow Sculpture Town' and initially the new title was used on council and other tourist publications, and on local road signs.

The sculpture collection has grown to be part of the town’s social fabric and are now repositories of the personal histories and collective memory of successive generations. They remain a focal point of cultural activity for schools, community groups, and visitors. Harlow Art Trust works with developers to commission new work and also runs an annual Sculpture Town Artist in Residence programme, giving an early career artist the opportunity to contribute their work to this collection of national significance.
