= John Donne Memorial =

Bronze sculpture in London, United Kingdom

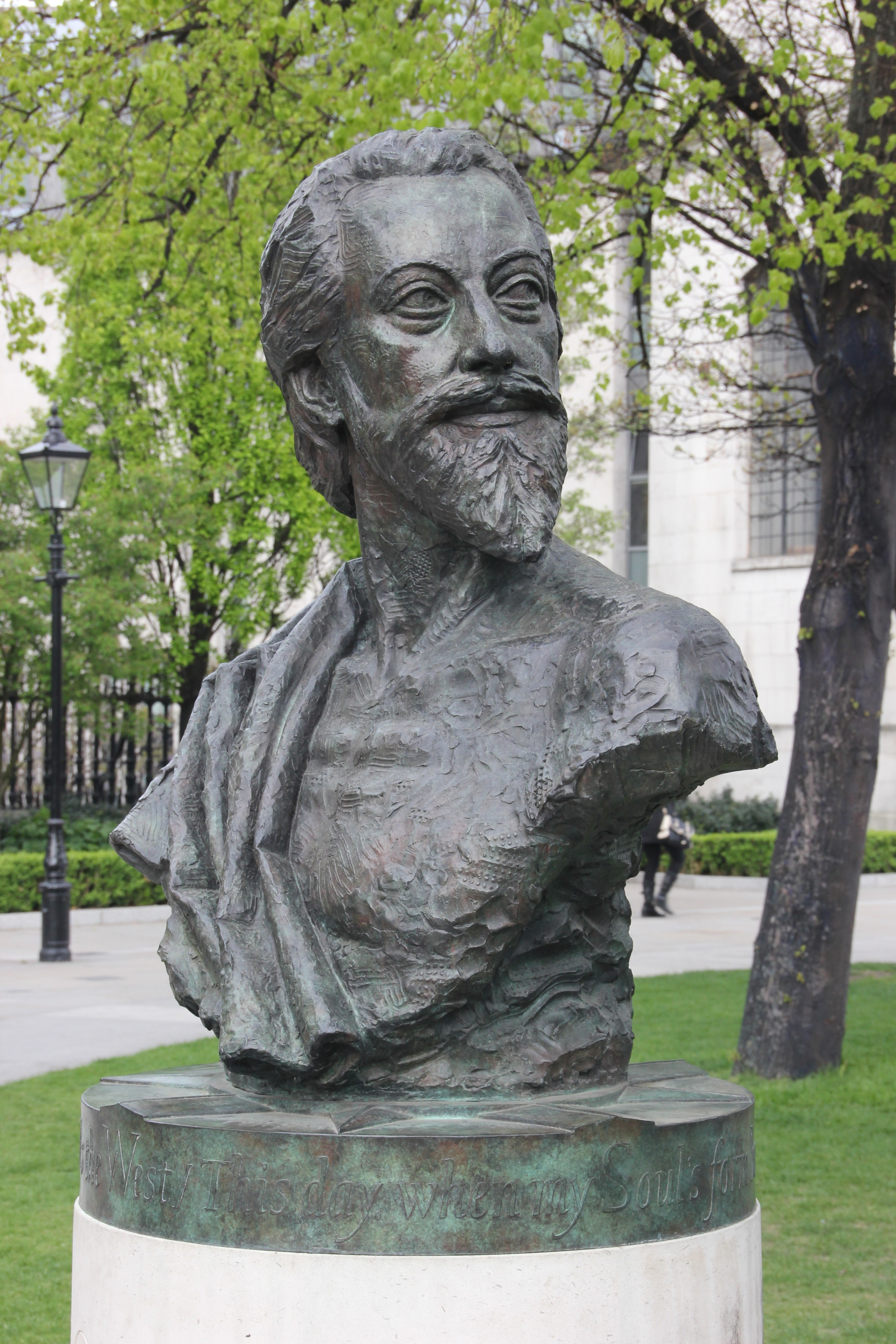
- The bust in 2014
- Artist: Nigel Boonham
- Subject: John Donne
- Location: London, United Kingdom; 51°30′48″N 0°05′50″W

The John Donne Memorial is a bronze bust of John Donne by Nigel Boonham, installed in the garden to the south of St Paul's Cathedral in London, United Kingdom. Donne faces east towards his birthplace on Bread Street. Below the bust is an inscription with the text

Hence is't, that I am carried towards the West,
This day, when my Soul's form bends to the East.

It was commissioned by the City of London, led by Alderman Robert Hall, and marks the first public memorial to Donne.
