= Le Pustra =

English cabaret artist

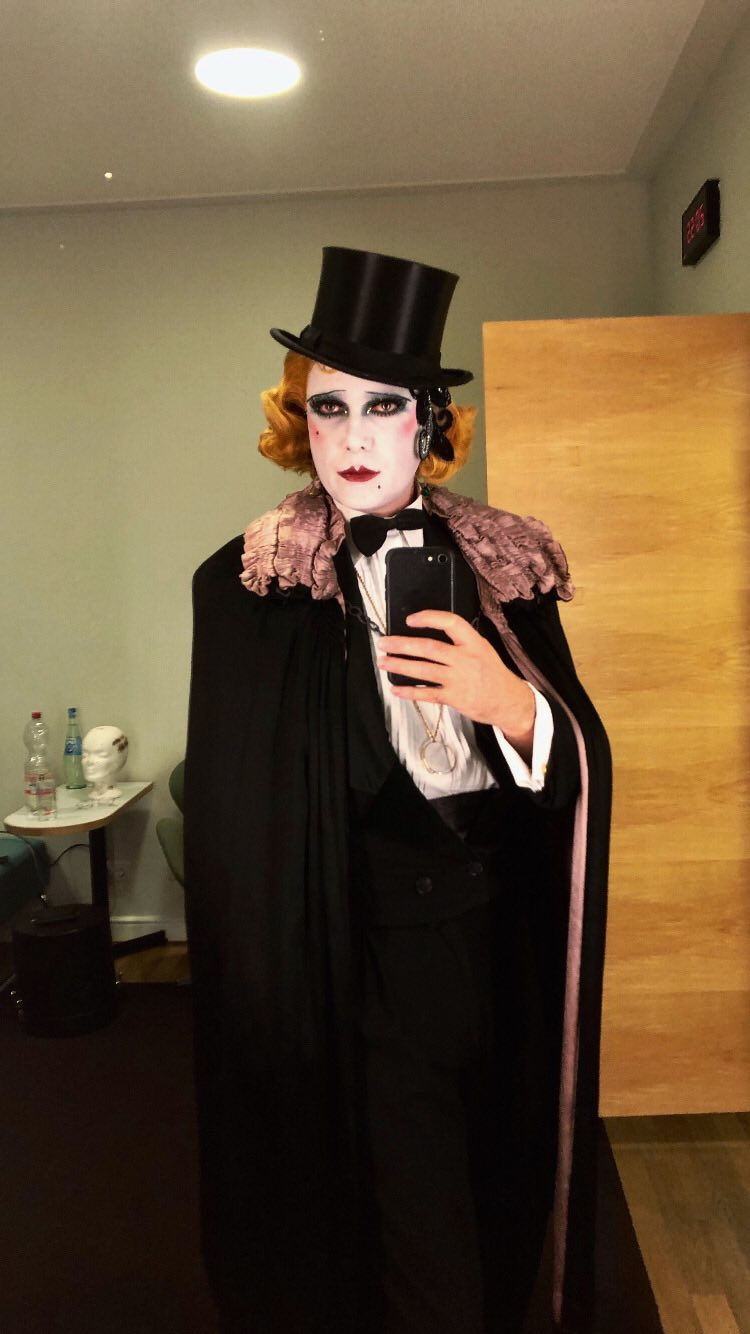
- Le Pustra at Philharmonie Berlin, 2025.

Background information
- Also known as: Madame Le Pustra
- Born: Cape Town, South Africa
- Genres: Cabaret, Actor, Varieté
- Occupations: Performance artist, singer, actor, life drawing model
- Years active: 2006–Present
- Members: Performers: Le Pustra.

Le Pustra (born 1 July 1977) is an actor, singer, salonnier and self-proclaimed kunstfigur - best known for his Weimar-cabaret-inspired show Kabarett der Namenlosen and his portrayal of Edwina Morell in the neo-noir German television series Babylon Berlin.

== Early life ==
Le Pustra (real name concealed) was born in Cape Town, South Africa, and relocated to the United Kingdom in 2000 to pursue a career in musical theatre in London. He had numerous odd jobs including working at London's Theatre Royal, Drury Lane as an usher, a sex worker, dishwasher and tarot card reader in nightclubs. In 2006, Le Pustra emerged onto the London underground cabaret and varieté scene appearing in different guises at numerous club nights, cabarets, festivals, and burlesque events. Between 2015 and 2026, Le Pustra lived in Berlin.

== Career ==
=== Varieté and Cabaret ===
Between 2006 and 2015, Le Pustra performed in numerous cabaret and variety shows as a sideshow and comedic performer. He dabbled in tarot card reading, was a self-taught musical saw player, and part of the Vaudevillian duo Pustra/Vile-een and The Gorey Cabinet with German actor, Malik Ibheis.

In early 2011, Le Pustra co-produced and wrote a Vaudevillian all-male show entitled 'Villains' which was produced in Rome's Teatro Palladium. RuPaul's Drag Race UK contestant Joe Black (drag queen) co-starred in the show. The show returned to Rome for one night only on 5 September 2011 at the Villa Celimontana Festival.

On 23 October 2012, Le Pustra was invited by Amanda Palmer to join a live musical saw performance (dubbed a Saw-chestra) and accompanying Neil Gaiman's live rendition of Leon Payne's song "Psycho". The Saw-chestra members included Le Pustra, Victor Victoria from musical duo, EastEnd Cabaret and Adrian Stout from cult Cabaret group, The Tiger Lillies.

Other Cabaret appearances include The Royal Academy of Arts, Skibo Castle, Wilton's Music Hall, The Box (London), Venice Carnival, Life Ball (Vienna), Södra Teatern (Stockholm), Edinburgh Fringe Festival, Lost Vagueness, Wintergarten Varieté (Berlin), Madame JoJo's (London), Palais de Tokyo (Paris), Schirn Kunsthalle (Frankfurt), Coney Island (New York) and Perth World Fringe Festival.

Club nights include The Face by Steve Strange, Torture Garden, Act ART and Club Room Service by drag queen DJ and party promoter Jodie Harsh.

=== Le Pustra's Kabarett der Namenlosen ===
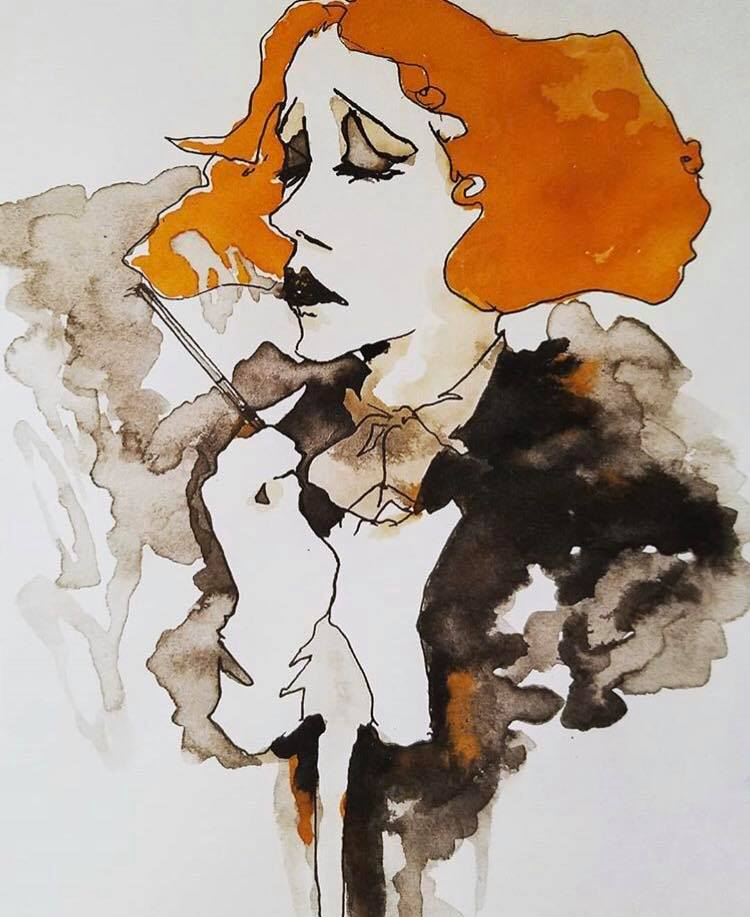
Le Pustra illustration by Anna Tikhomirova (2019)

In 2011, Le Pustra created a contemporary reimagining of the Berliner Kabarett during the Weimar Culture interwar period in Berlin. The show was entitled Le Pustra's Kabarett der Namenlosen or Cabaret of the Nameless and was first performed on 24 September 2011 at the Old Cholmeley Boys Club in London.

In 2016, the project was developed in Berlin and co-produced by Else Edelstahl from Bohème Sauvage. The show featured an international cast and selected music from Friedrich Hollaender, Mischa Spoliansky, Willy Rosen and Kurt Weill. Le Pustra's character was partly inspired by dancer Anita Berber and Marlene Dietrich. The original show, also entitled Kabarett der Namenlosen, was a notorious but popular cabaret in Weimar-era Berlin from 1926 to 1932, created by Erich Lowinsky - also known as "Elow". Le Pustra's vermilion-coloured wig was designed by hairstylist Nina Butkovich-Budden from Nina's Hair Parlour.

Between 2016 and 2019, American artist Ella Guru created three large oil paintings inspired by the show. In 2018, Irish artist Alana Richards created a series of paintings and an art exhibition based on the show's characters entitled Morphium: Hallucinations of a Kabarett.

In 2020, an unfinished documentary focusing on Le Pustra and the project was abandoned.

In 2022, Kabarett der Namenlosen was featured in Babylon Berlin Season 4, with Le Pustra reprising his role as Edwina Morell. The scene presents a new interpretation of Erich Lowinsky's notorious cabaret, originally staged at the Monbijou Cabaret in Berlin on Monday nights.

A revival of Kabarett der Namenlosen was staged on 8–9 December 2023 at Heimathafen Neukölln in Berlin. A souvenir booklet, Memoirs of a Kabarett, featuring text by Le Pustra, was printed for the show's performances.

The song "Opium Express", written by Italian songwriter Fiammetta Alexander, was inspired by Le Pustra and his show.

This project has contributed to Le Pustra's association with contemporary interpretations of Weimar-era Berlin cabaret aesthetics.

=== Television ===
In 2020, Le Pustra made his television debut as Edwina Morell, a sinister cross-dressing souteneur of the Luxor nightclub in the third season of German crime drama Babylon Berlin. The character of Edwina was inspired by Le Pustra's Kabarett der Namenlosen theatre show. In 2022, Le Pustra returned as Edwina in the fourth season, portraying the character as the host of the Kabarett der Namenlosen at the Moka Efti nightclub. The scene draws on Elow’s original 1920s concept and was written with Le Pustra in mind. In the fifth and final season, Morell appears briefly in two episodes as the manageress of the Mikado club, this time with blonde hair.

=== Moka Efti Orchestra ===
As of May 2023, Le Pustra has performed regularly with the big band Moka Efti Orchestra as a featured soloist. In 2025, Le Pustra participated as a special guest in the show Der Nasse Fisch ("The Wet Fish"), a 13-date German tour, performing alongside actor Benno Fürmann. The tour spanned 12 cities and included venues such as the Gewandhaus in Leipzig, the Prinzregententheater in Munich, the Admiralspalast in Berlin, and the Laeiszhalle in Hamburg.

On 26 November 2025, Le Pustra performed with the orchestra in a sold-out concert at the Berliner Philharmonie.

=== Babylon Berlin Live in Concert ===
On 11–13 September 2023, Le Pustra appeared as a featured soloist in the Babylon Berlin Concert alongside Estonian conductor Kristjan Järvi, singer Max Raabe, actress Meret Becker and composer Johnny Klimek. Le Pustra performed the song Heut' Nacht in Peru. The concert was broadcast on Germany's Das Erste channel as a TV special on the 1st of October 2023.

=== Reception and scholarship ===
In 2024, Le Pustra's portrayal of Morell was discussed in the essay collection Babylon Berlin, German Visual Spectacle, and Global Media Culture, edited by Hester Baer and Jill Suzanne Smith and published by Bloomsbury USA. Smith also examines Le Pustra's stage persona in The Afterlives of Weimar Berlin: Twenty-First-Century Literature, Media, and Visual Culture, published by Camden House Publishing, and in the chapter "Shadows of Babylon and Shreds of Artificial Silk" in the Cambridge University Press volume Weimar's Long Shadow (2024).

=== Other Film & Television ===
In 2015, Le Pustra appeared in director Shelly Love's unfinished fantasy short film The Fallen Circus playing a latex-clad villain. He can also be heard on the film's score as a guest musical saw player accompanying The Irrepressibles. Le Pustra's costume was designed by Oliver Garcia, who has worked on films such as Maleficent and Hugo.

In October 2017, Le Pustra and the cast of Kabarett der Namenlosen performed "Das lila Lied" for the BBC Four series Tunes for Tyrants: Music and Power with Suzy Klein.

In 2018, he appeared on Anthony Bourdain: Parts Unknown"Here's what Tony and his guests had to say about Berlin". Explore Parts Unknown. 6 June 2018. which aired on CNN (Season 11, Episode 6). That year, Le Pustra appeared in two 16 mm short films by American filmmaker Julie Orlick.

In 2025, Le Pustra appeared in two episodes of the web series Bulletin Berlin, created by British photographer Gavin Evans.

=== Music Videos and Collaborations ===
In 2007, Le Pustra appeared in the music video "Starz in Their Eyes" by British recording artist Just Jack.

In 2018, Le Pustra played dual roles in the music video "Black for the Occasion" by Faroese artist Heiðrik á Heygum.

In 2023, Le Pustra appeared in the music video for "Ghosts," a single by Berlin-based artist Paura Diamante.

In 2026, Le Pustra collaborated with the ambient band Ten Thousand Lakes on a reinterpretation of the German aria "Glück, das mir verblieb" ("Marietta’s Lied") from Erich Wolfgang Korngold’s opera Die tote Stadt.

=== Fashion and visual arts ===
In 2010, Le Pustra produced and directed a fashion film for Serbian designer Marko Mitanovski which was screened at London Fashion Week, London's Selfridges and Malaysian International Fashion Week. The short fashion film, Mr Pustra's Lament Act II, was selected to screen at Diane Pernet's Film Festival, A Shaded View on Fashion Film, in Milan, Italy, in June 2012. That same year, Le Pustra walked in London Fashion Week for designer Ziad Ghanem at Freemasons' Hall, London and was invited back the following year. Le Pustra also modelled for fashion designer Ivana Pilja in 2013, and they collaborated once again for Berlin Alternative Fashion Week in September 2015 and March 2016.

Other work includes an advertising campaign for Air Berlin and a cameo appearance in Stephen Lally's fashion film The Dionysian.

== Artistic Persona and visual style ==
Le Pustra's stage identity can be understood within the tradition of the Kunstfigur—an artistically constructed persona in which the performer becomes both creator and creation. Rather than functioning solely as a character adopted for individual performances, Le Pustra has developed a continuous visual and theatrical identity that extends across cabaret, photography, film, costume, and public appearances. He frequently performs in white-faced clown makeup reminiscent of the Pierrot character and a porcelain-doll aesthetic

This approach recalls the tradition of artists who used self-fashioning as an artistic medium. The Italian aristocrat and muse Luisa Casati, whose declaration "I want to be a work of art" became associated with her extravagant self-presentation, represents an earlier example of the body and persona being treated as a form of artistic expression. Similarly, Le Pustra's performances explore the transformation of identity into an ongoing visual artwork, combining elements of cabaret, drag, Gothic aesthetics, silent cinema, and avant-garde fashion.

The persona incorporates references to early twentieth-century artistic movements, including German Expressionism, Surrealism, and Weimar-era cabaret. Through elaborate costumes, white-faced makeup, and theatrical presentation, Le Pustra creates a figure that exists between character, performance, and visual art.

=== Publications and recognition ===
Le Pustra has appeared in publications including British and Italian Vogue, Hunger Magazine, Reuters, French Playboy, I-D, V Magazine, Dark Beauty Magazine, Spindle Magazine. Images of Le Pustra have also been published in books including New Club Kids: London Party Fashion in the Noughties by photographer Oggy Yordanov, What Else Is in the Teaches of Peaches by Peaches (musician), Night Flowers by Damien Frost, Boy Story by Magnus Arrevad, In der Fremde: Pictures from Home by Romeo Alaeff, The Fantastic World of Atelieri O. Haapala and Martin Schoeller's photobook Drag Queens

In 2017, the Victoria and Albert Museum acquired a photograph of Le Pustra by Magnus Arrevad for its permanent collection. The work remains in the museum's collection and is not currently on public display.

== Academia and Lectures ==
In 2020, Le Pustra co-authored a chapter with Dr. Anna-Sophie Jürgens for the book Circus and the Avant-Gardes: History, Imaginary, Innovation published by Routledge. The chapter, titled Glam Clowning: From Dada to Gaga – A Conversation with Le Pustra explores the origin and reinterpretation of the Dada inspired vinyl suit made famous by German countertenor and New Wave artist, Klaus Nomi.

In 2025, Le Pustra's work has also been discussed in academic scholarship, including Dr Will Visconti's essay “The language(s) of contemporary cabaret” published in the journal Comedy Studies, which examines contemporary cabaret performers drawing on historical traditions such as Weimar-era Berlin cabaret.

Le Pustra has participated as a guest speaker for various Educational Institutions including UCLA, Goethe-Institut, CIEE in Berlin, Humboldt University of Berlin, Australian National University, Freie Universität Berlin and The London Archives.

Between 2022 and 2026, a series of online illustrated talks were created for Morbid Anatomy with provocative titles such as Anita Berber: Tanz der Schönen und Verdammten, Opium: Darkling's Muse and Glitter, Guts & Glam: The Creatures of the Night.
