= Lewcock =

Lewcock is a surname. Notable people with the surname include:

- Connie Lewcock (1894–1980), British suffragette, arsonist and socialist
- R. A. Lewcock (1846–1932), British architect
