= EastEnd Cabaret =

British caberet performers

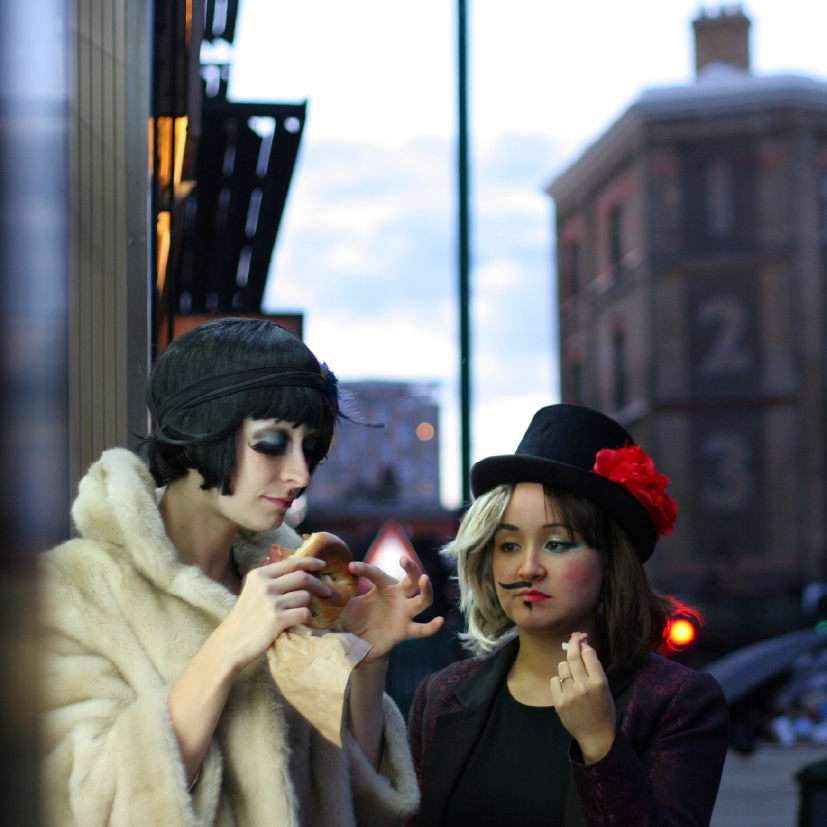
- Bernadette Byrne (left) and Victor Victoria

Background information
- Genres: Cabaret Comedy
- Years active: 2009–2018
- Members: Bernie Dieter, Victoria Falconer
- Website: www.eastendcabaret.com

EastEnd Cabaret is a musical comedy cabaret character duo based in London, England, formed in late 2009.

== History ==
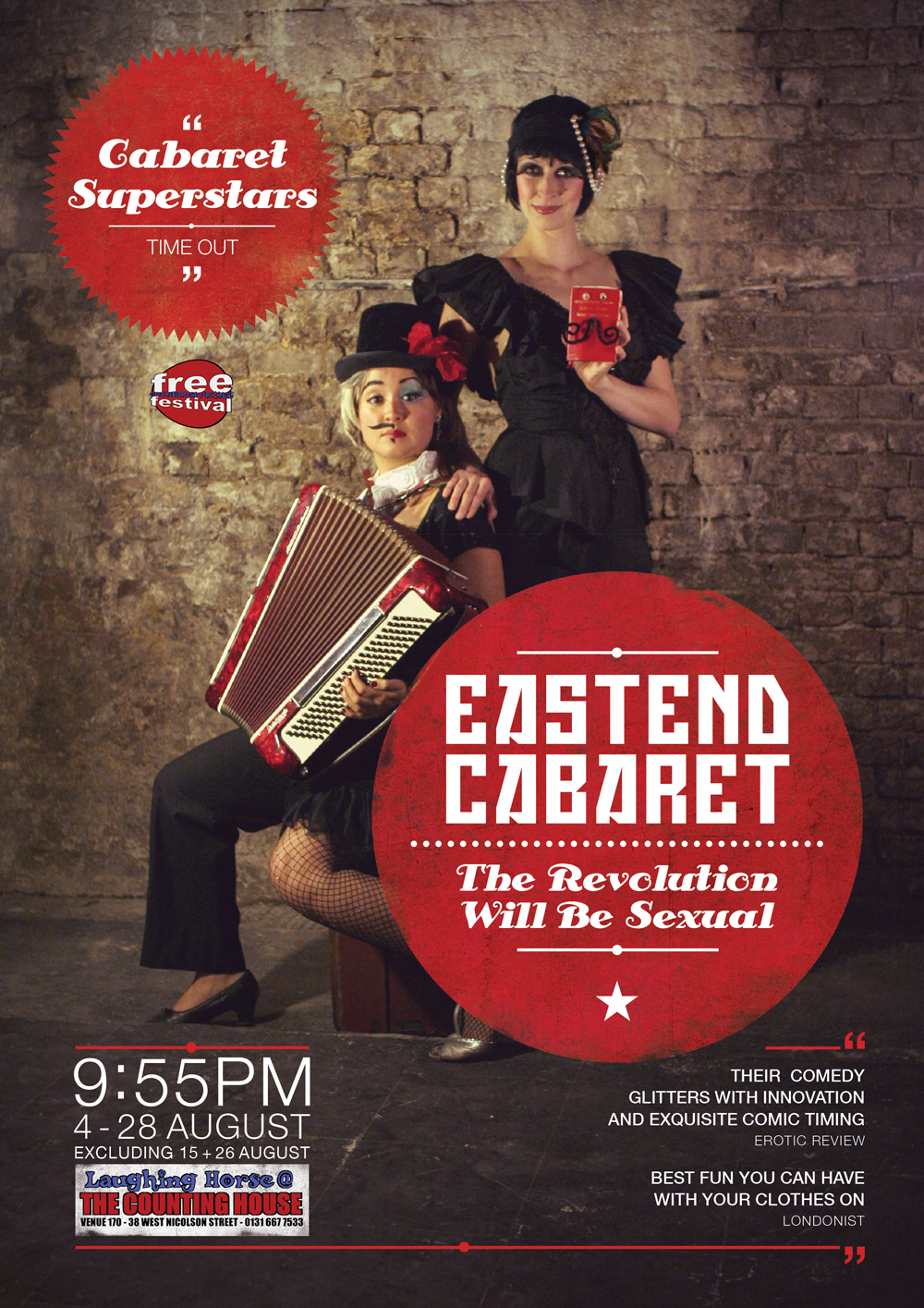
Poster for The Revolution Will Be Sexual

The first incarnation of EastEnd Cabaret was in November 2009 at the iconic East End pub owned by artist Pauline Forster, The George Tavern. The show was called Bernadette Byrne (Bernie Dieter) and the EastEnd Cabaret, and took the form of a cabaret revue, featuring singers, poets and comedians.

EastEnd Cabaret created and curated "The Attic" in December 2010, a pop-up cabaret bar in an illegal squat in Soho. The building (which once housed the Limelight Club, famed in the 1980s for celebrity nightclubbers including Prince) was taken over by art squatters The Oubliette Arthouse.

In 2011, in an article on the London cabaret scene, the duo was named as one of Time Out magazine's Top Ten "Cabaret Superstars".

Their critically acclaimed live shows toured across multiple countries and festivals, including repeat appearances at Edinburgh Fringe, the Arcola Theatre, the Famous Spiegeltent at Melbourne International Comedy Festival, New Zealand Comedy Festival and Soho Theatre.

Their final live show was at Darwin Festival in 2017.

== Awards ==
| Year | Award | Category | Result | Ref. |
|---|---|---|---|---|
| 2012 | Adelaide Fringe | Best Cabaret (overall) | Won | |
| 2012 | Hospital Club hClub100 | Performance | Won | |
| 2012 | TO&ST Time Out & Soho Theatre Award, Edinburgh Fringe | Best Cabaret | Nominated | |
| 2015 | London Cabaret Awards | Best Musical Variety Act | Won | |

== Other media ==
=== Television ===
EastEnd Cabaret filmed two of their songs for the third season of Live at the Electric, BBC Three's comedy variety show hosted by comedian Russell Kane. The episodes were screened in early 2014. They also appeared on ABC2 in 2014 for Comedy Up Late, a live variety show featuring the best of the Melbourne International Comedy Festival.

=== Radio ===
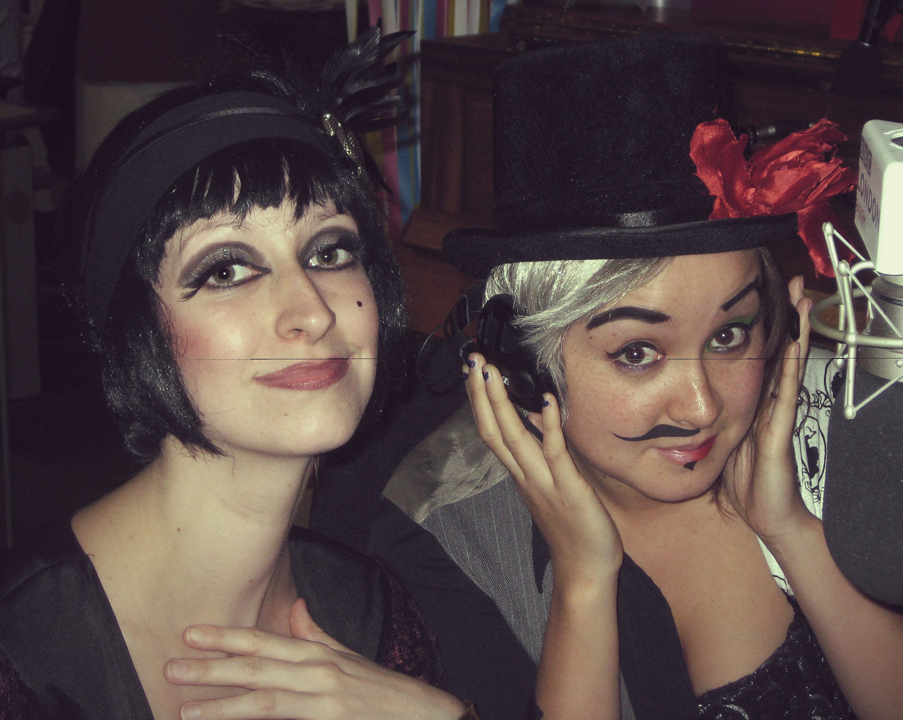
Bernadette Byrne (left) and Victor Victoria at BBC London

EastEnd Cabaret appeared on BBC Radio 1's Edinburgh Fringe programme, "Fun and Filth Cabaret" in 2012. Hosted by Nick Grimshaw, it streamed on radio and YouTube. In June 2011, the duo appeared on BBC London's Late Night Show with Joanne Good, performing "Is It in Yet" (a song recounting Bernadette's attempt to deflower three different virgins) to a shocked host, but delighted listeners.

EastEnd Cabaret have also performed live on 3 JOY's programme The Cabaret Room with Paul Williamson in Melbourne, as well as on Sundays with Libbi Gorr on 774 ABC Melbourne, Fresh Air, SAFM and 891 ABC Adelaide.

=== Online and elsewhere ===
EastEnd Cabaret's innovative use of online marketing tools was one of the aspects highlighted by judges of The Hospital Club hClub100 award. They were placed in performance category top ten alongside comedian Tim Key, comedy producers Underbelly and presenter Layla Anna-Lee. The music video for their original song, "Dangerwank", filmed and edited by Triple A Films, has had over 53,000 hits to date.
