= Florence Callcott =

British artist (1866–1938)

- Born: Florence Newman; 1866; St James, London England
- Died: 21 January 1938 (aged 71–72); Hendon, London
- Education: Slade School of Fine Art
- Known for: Sculpture, medallist
- Spouse: Frederick Thomas Callcott

Florence Callcott née Florence Newman (1866 – 21 January 1938) was a British sculptor of portrait medallions and medals.

== Biography ==
Callcott was born in the St James area of central London and studied sculpture at the Slade School of Fine Art. She first exhibited a work at the Royal Academy in 1890 and then regularly at leading commercial galleries until 1930. Callcott worked in bronze, wax and plaster on a wide variety of subjects. She specialised in creating portrait medallions and showed examples at the Paris Salon in both 1897 and 1904 and at the Royal Academy in 1906 and 1907. In total she showed 21 works at the Royal Academy between 1890 and 1925 and also exhibited at the Royal Scottish Academy, the Royal Glasgow Institute of the Fine Arts and with the Society of Women Artists. She married the sculptor Frederick Thomas Callcott in 1912 and they sometimes worked on commissions together. Callcott also painted miniatures, one of which is in the British Royal Collection, and she was elected an Associate member of the Royal Society of Miniature Painters.
