= The Black Friar, Blackfriars =

Listed pub in London, England

Black Friar
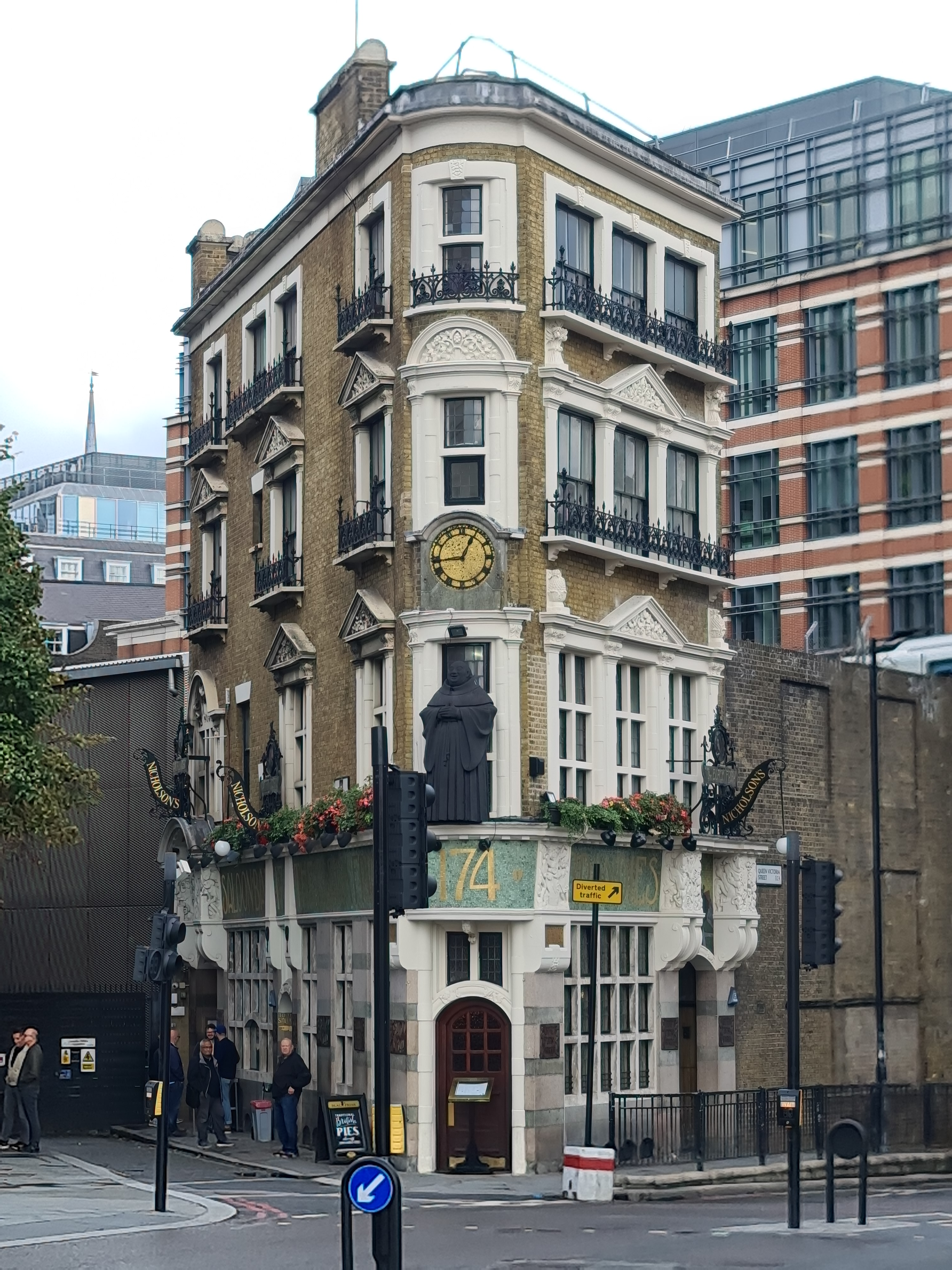
- The pub in 2022
- Alternative names: The Blackfriar

General information
- Type: Public house
- Architectural style: Arts and Crafts
- Location: 174 Queen Victoria Street, Blackfriars, London, EC4, England
- Coordinates: 51.5121°N 0.1037°W
- Year built: c. 1875; 151 years ago
- Renovated: c. 1905 and 1917 (remodelled)
- Owner: Mitchells & Butlers

Design and construction
- Designations

Listed Building – Grade II*
- Official name: The Black Friar public house
- Designated: 5 June 1972
- Reference no.: 1285723

Renovating team
- Architects: Herbert Fuller-Clark; Frederick T. Callcott; Henry Poole

Website
- Official website

The Black Friar (also known as The Blackfriar) is a Grade II* listed pub on Queen Victoria Street in Blackfriars, London, England. Built in about 1875 on the site of a medieval Dominican friary, it was extensively remodelled in the Arts and Crafts style by the architect Herbert Fuller-Clark from 1905, with decorative work by the sculptors Frederick T. Callcott and Henry Poole. It is included on the Campaign for Real Ale's (CAMRA) National Inventory of Historic Pub Interiors and has a three-star rating denoting an interior "of outstanding national historic importance".

== History ==
The building was constructed in about 1875 on the site of a former medieval Dominican friary and was remodelled in about 1905 by the architect Herbert Fuller-Clark. Much of the internal decoration was carried out by the sculptors Frederick T. Callcott and Henry Poole, whose work reflected the site's monastic associations. A further phase of work followed between 1917 and 1921, when a vaulted rear room known as the Grotto was completed within a former railway arch to designs prepared by Fuller-Clark in 1913 but delayed by the First World War.

The building was nearly demolished during a phase of redevelopment in the 1960s, until it was saved by a campaign spearheaded by poet Sir John Betjeman. On 5 June 1972, the Black Friar was designated a Grade II* listed building.

It was included on the Campaign for Real Ale (CAMRA)'s National Inventory of Historic Pub Interiors before the inventory's grading system was revised. Under the revised scheme, it is rated three stars and its interior is regarded as being "of outstanding national historic importance". As of February 2026, the pub's freehold was owned by Mitchells & Butlers and it was operated as part of the company's Nicholson's pub chain.

== Architecture ==
=== Exterior ===
The building occupies a corner site and has a roughly triangular footprint. It has four storeys, with basement levels below, and is built of yellow brick with stone detailing. The flat roof is marked by two tall chimneys.

The ground floor contains the pub frontage, which wraps around both street elevations and the angled corner. Entrances are provided on each frontage and at the corner itself. Above the ground floor is a wide mosaic band incorporating the name of the pub and other lettering, interspersed with carved panels depicting scenes associated with drinking and friars. Additional decorative panels and hanging signs are located above the entrances, while a mosaic image of a friar marks the Queen Victoria Street entrance.

The upper floors contain elaborately detailed windows, including grouped windows facing Queen Victoria Street and a clock on the corner elevation. Decorative metal guards are fitted to many of the windows. The building is finished with a projecting cornice below the roofline.

=== Interior ===
The interior is richly decorated, making extensive use of marble, mosaics, metalwork, wood panelling and sculptural decoration. At the rear is a small vaulted room known as the Grotto, created within a former railway arch.

The main bar contains a large fireplace set within a broad arched recess, with built-in seating on either side. Decorative panels above and around the fireplace depict friars and other figures associated with the pub's theme. Stained glass, relief panels and metalwork continue throughout the room, including artwork above the bar illustrating scenes of monks engaged in everyday activities.

The Grotto is entered through a series of arches and has a vaulted ceiling decorated with mosaics and marble detailing. Bronze relief panels, sculpted figures and decorative inscriptions are incorporated throughout the space. Many of the decorative schemes draw on scenes from monastic life, alongside references to nursery rhymes and Aesop's Fables.

Further decorative features include carved capitals, ornamental lighting brackets and panels incorporating materials such as mother-of-pearl and coloured stone. Mirrors are used extensively, creating the impression of a larger space within the relatively small room.

== Gallery ==
=== Exterior ===
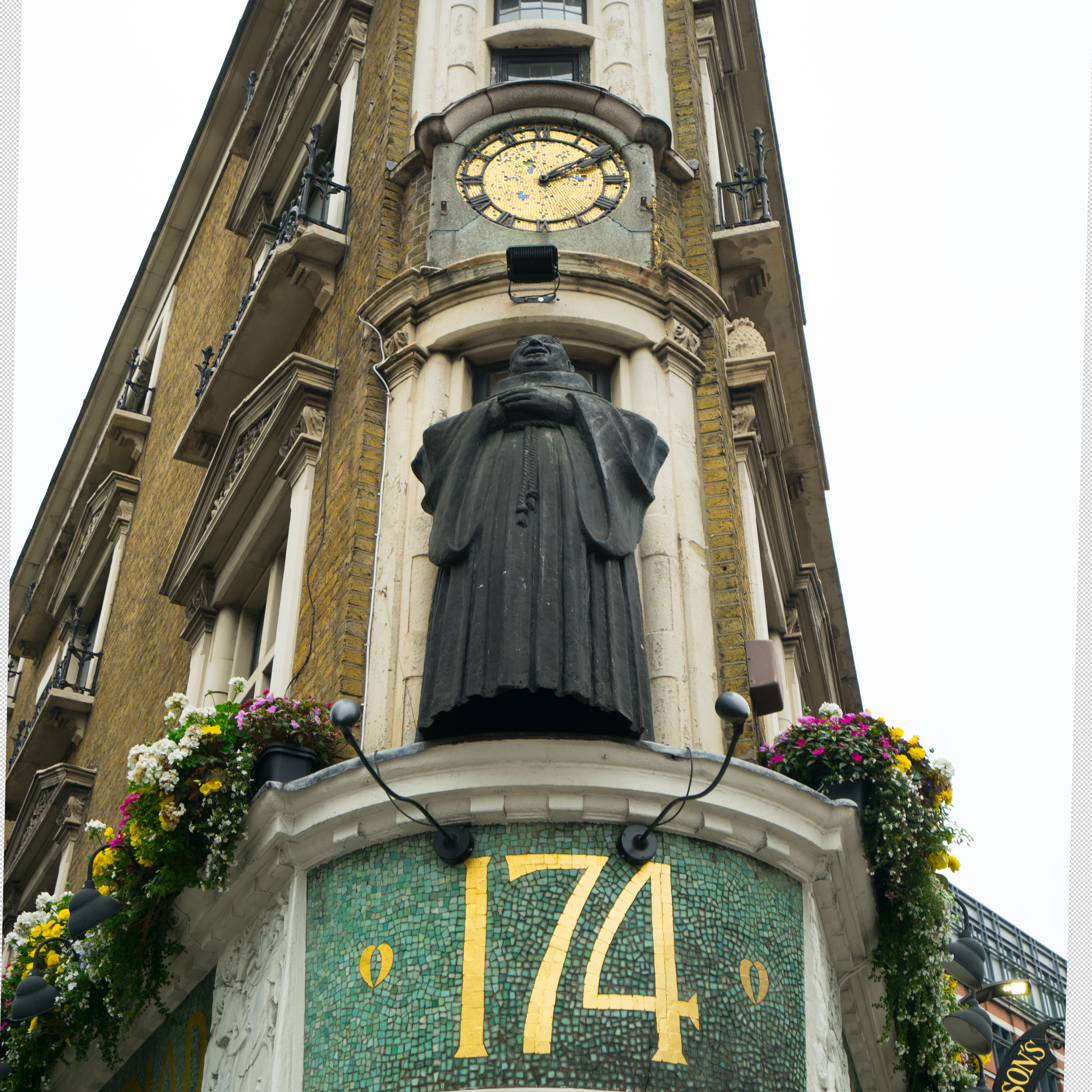
Statue and clock on the corner elevation in 2017

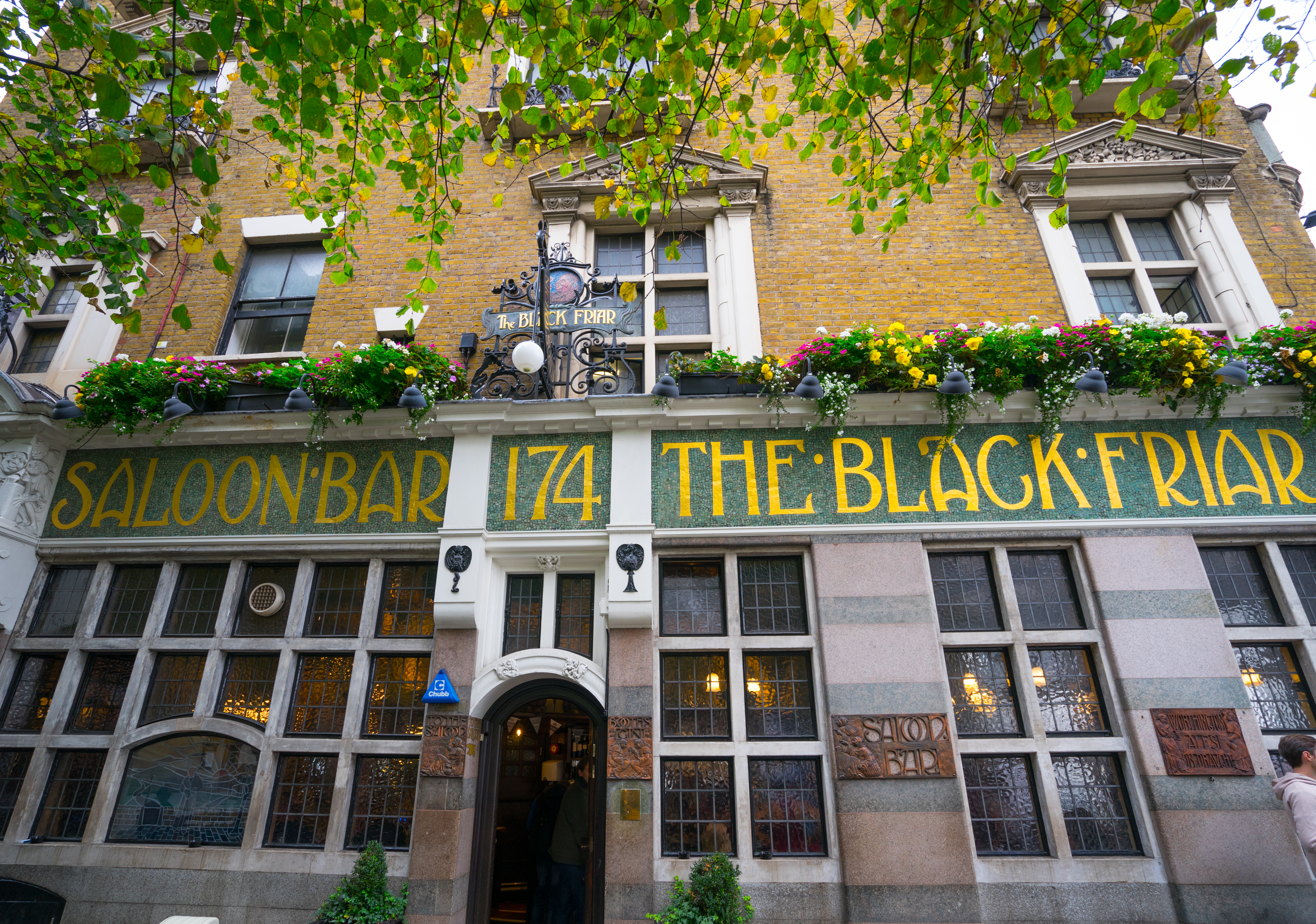
The pub entrance in 2017

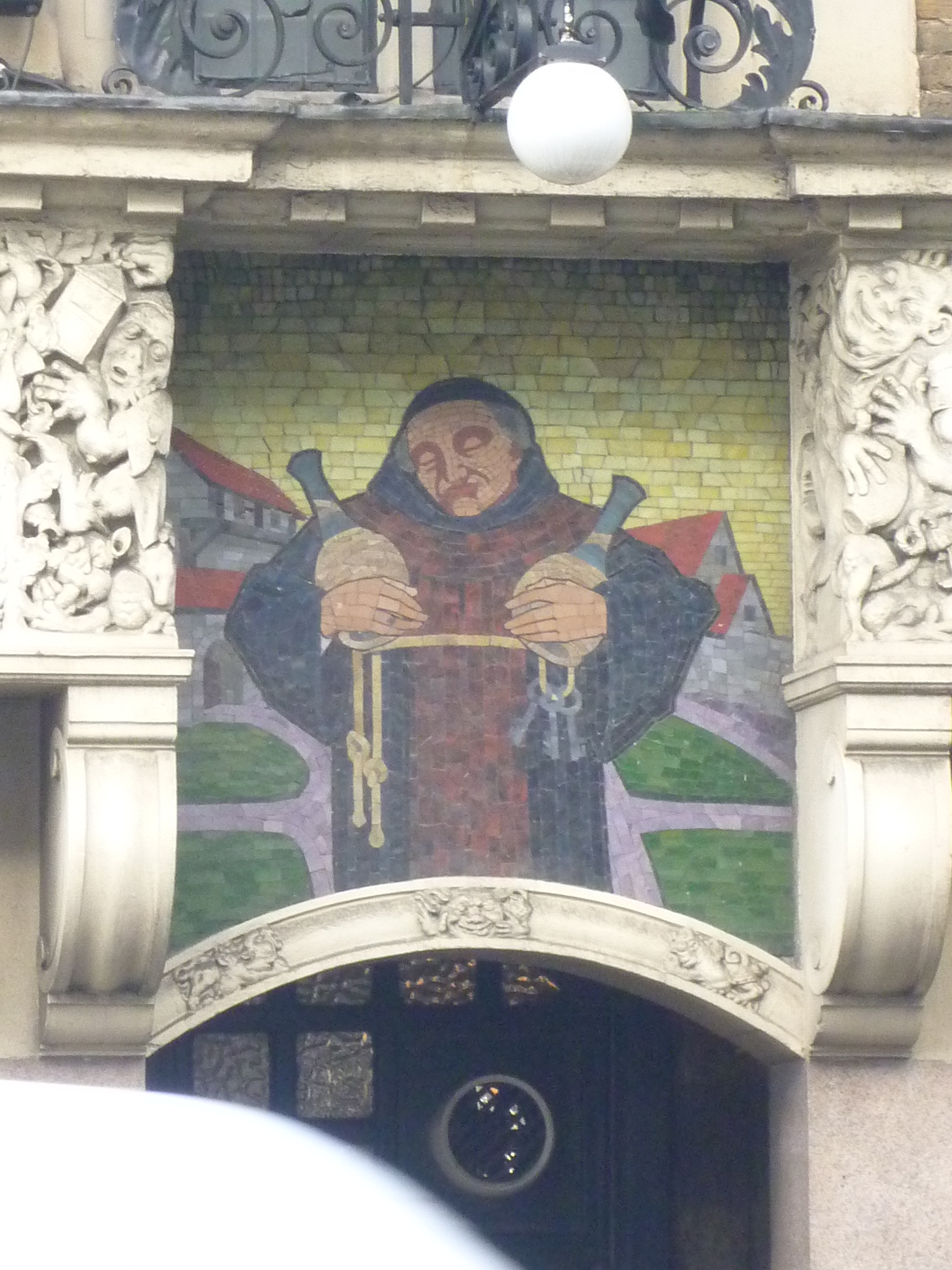
Mosaic decoration in 2017

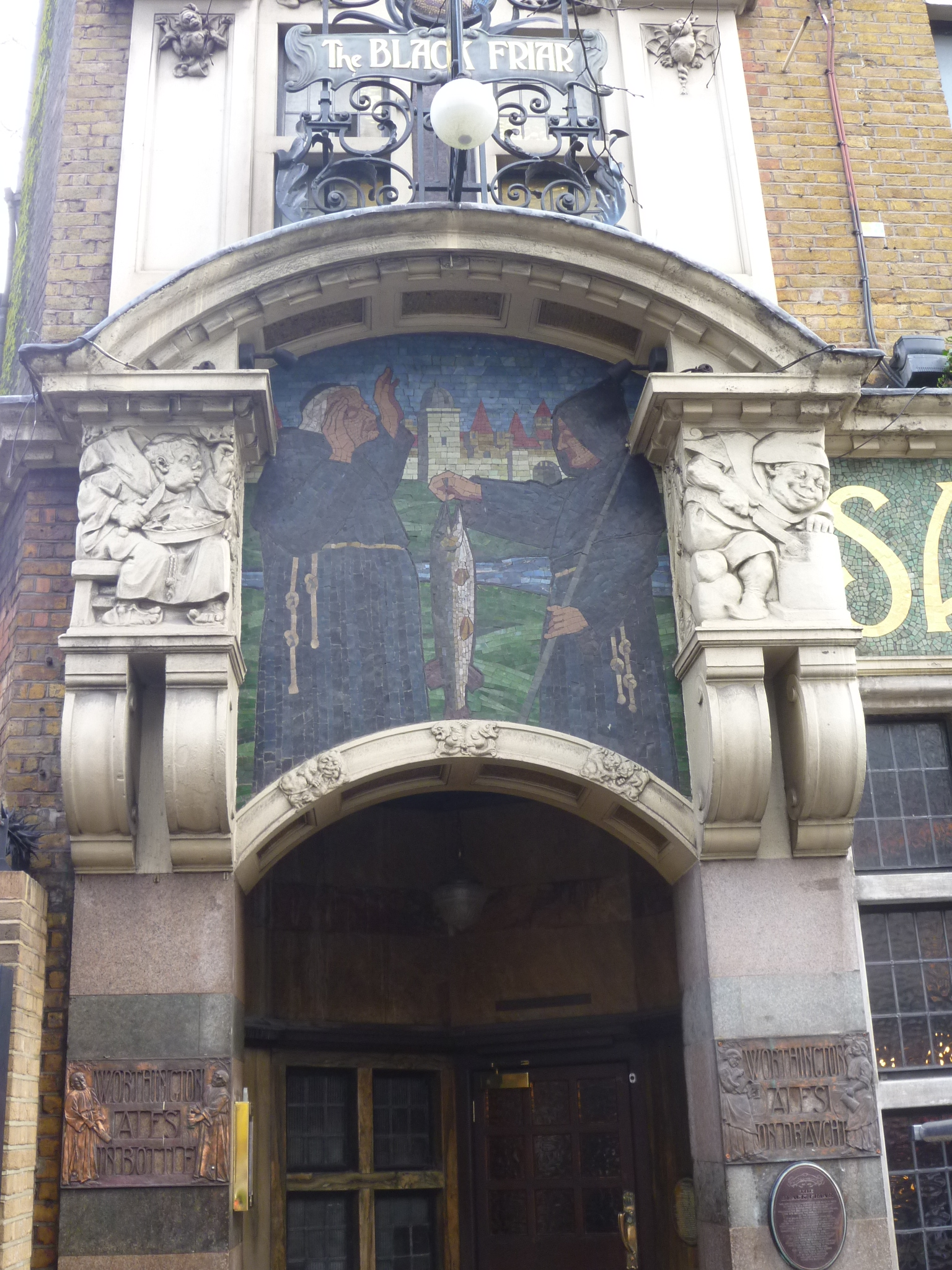
Mosaic decoration in 2017

=== Interior ===
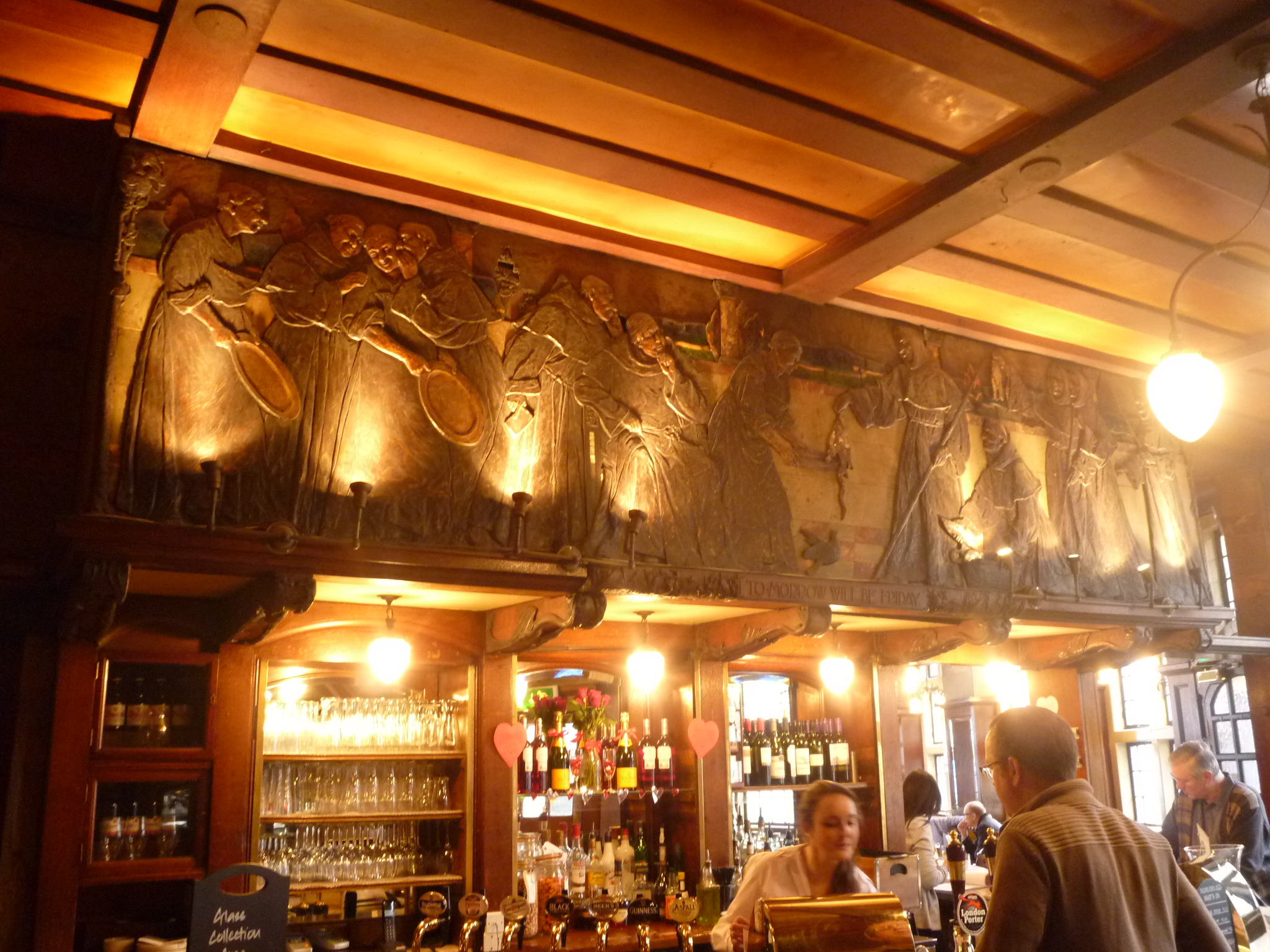
Relief panels in 2013

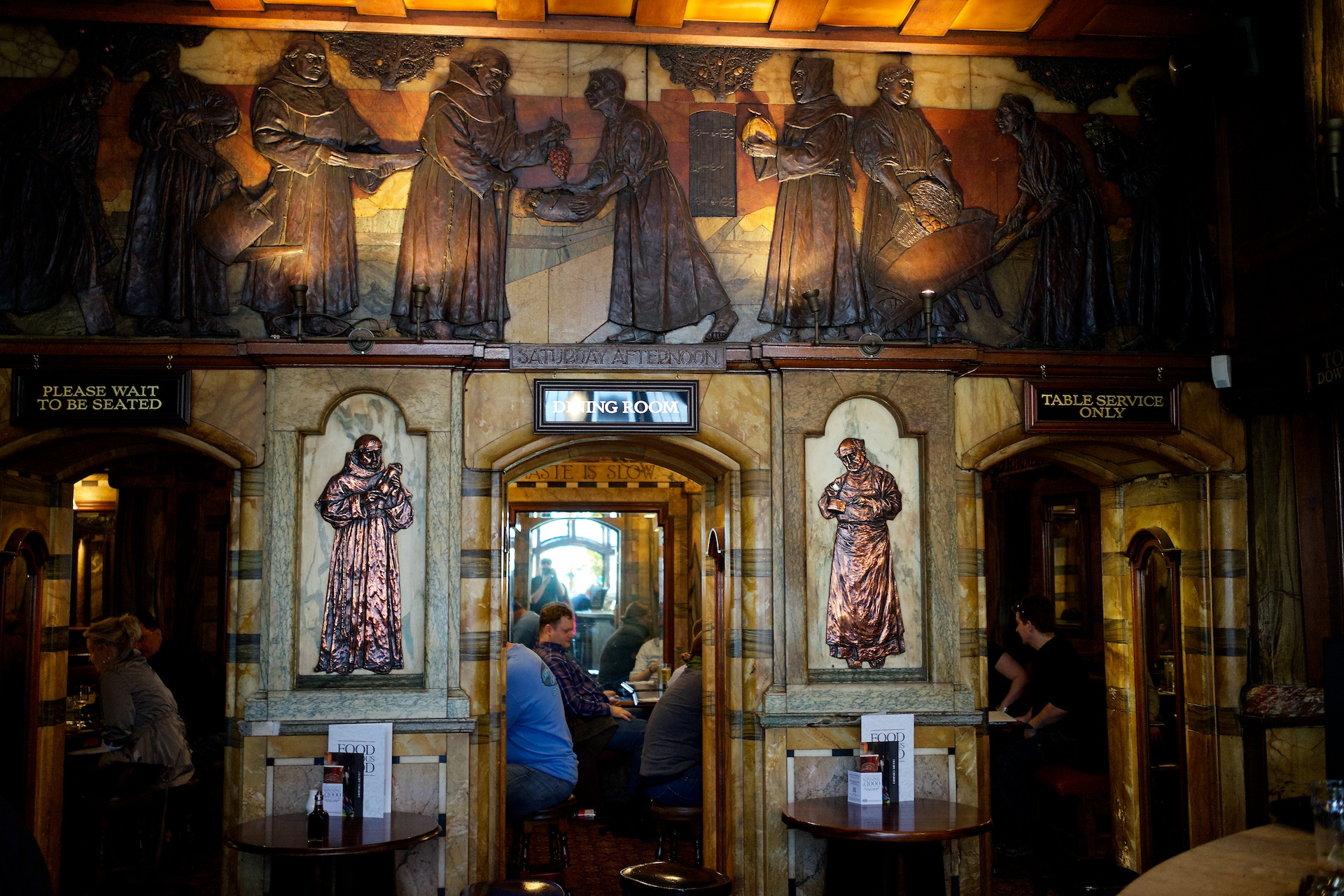
Arcaded arches in 2014

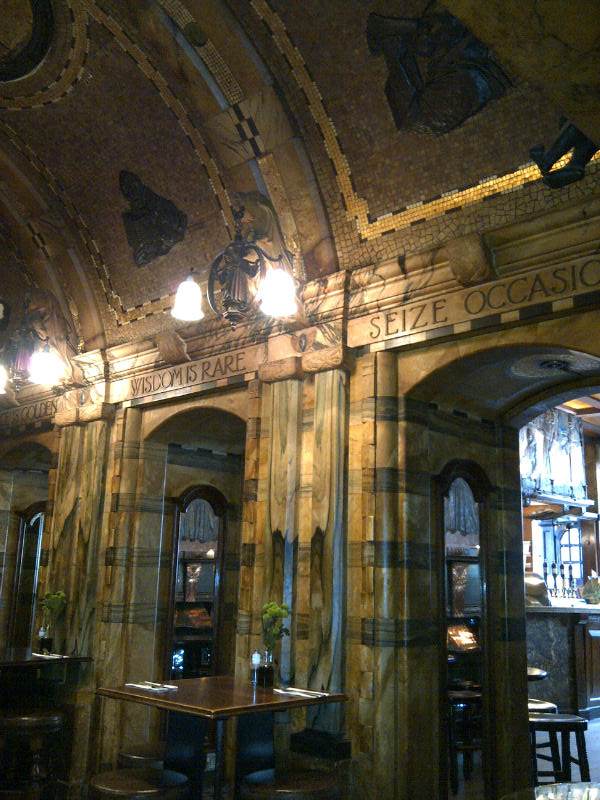
Barrel-vaulted Grotto in 2013

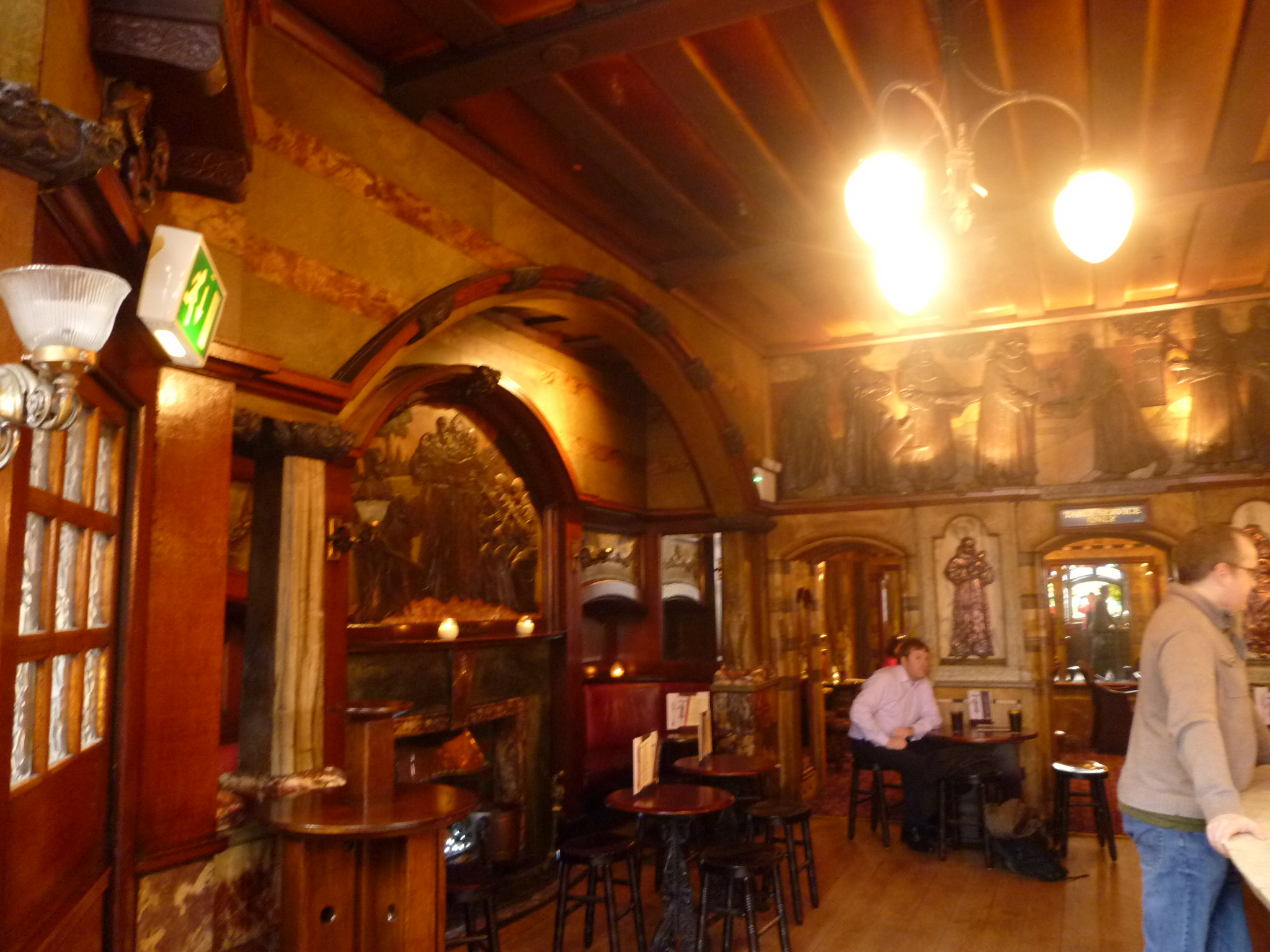
Fireplace recess in 2013

== See also ==
- Grade II* listed buildings in the City of London
