= Herbert Fuller-Clark =

British architect

- Born: 1869; London, England
- Died: 27 September 1934 (age 65); Anerley, Surrey, England
- Occupation: Architect
- Buildings: Black Friar

Harold Herbert Fuller-Clark (1869 – 27 September 1934) was a British Arts and Crafts architect.

== Career ==
Fuller-Clark was the architect responsible, in 1905, for the ground floor interior of the Black Friar, a Grade II* listed public house at 174 Queen Victoria Street, Blackfriars, London.

Fuller-Clark also designed Boulting's Offices at Riding House Street, which OUP describe as "a remarkably free composition", as well as 40 and 41a Foley Street, London in about 1908. In 1912, he appeared to have been in Jamaica.

== Personal life ==
A member of Nautilus SC, he won the Surrey County Water Polo Association Senior Competitions in 1903 and 1904, having won other swimming and water polo medals in 1891 (as Captain H. F. Clark), 1899, 1902 and 1903.

On 3 June 1911, he married Alice Maud Tewson (1878–1957). They had a son, Second Lieutenant Herbert Tewson Fuller-Clark (1913–24 March 1942) who served in the Royal Indian Army Service Corps: he was killed in India and is buried in the Delhi War Cemetery.

Fuller-Clark died in 1934 in Anerley, Surrey - reportedly on 27 September but his death was registered in Bromley, Kent in the July–August quarter, 1934.
