= Black Lion, Kilburn =

Listed pub in London, England

Black Lion
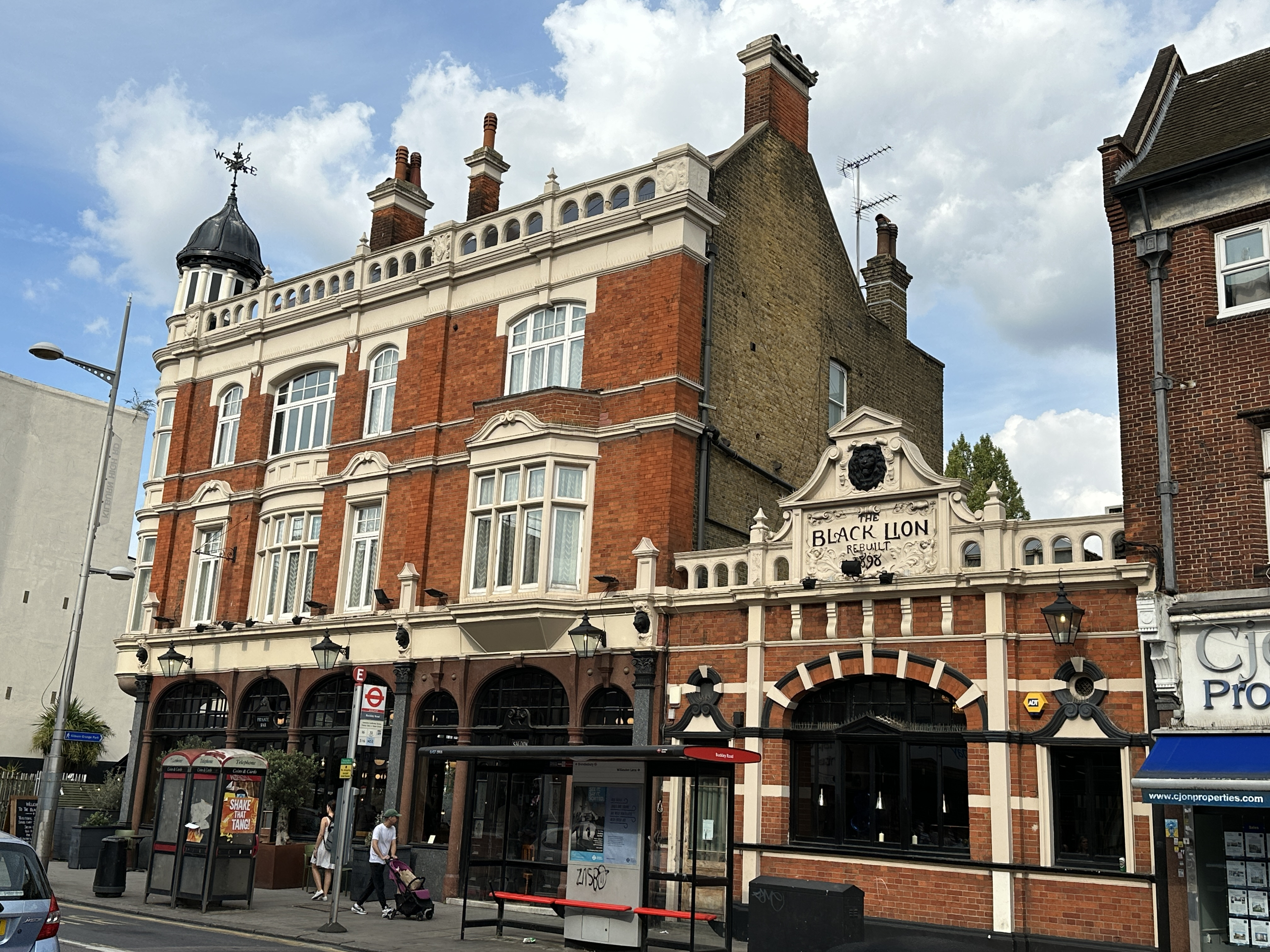
- The pub in 2023

General information
- Type: Public house
- Architectural style: Flemish Gothic
- Location: 274 Kilburn High Road, Kilburn, London, England
- Coordinates: 51.543796°N 0.199868°W
- Year built: c. 1898; 128 years ago
- Renovated: 2003 (refurbished); 2022 (restored)
- Owner: B & B London Properties Ltd.

Design and construction
- Architect: R. A. Lewcock
- Other designers: Frederick T. Callcott
- Designations

Listed Building – Grade II*
- Official name: Black Lion public house
- Designated: 14 May 1974
- Reference no.: 1379254

Website
- blacklionkilburn.co.uk

The Black Lion is a Grade II* listed public house with accommodation on Kilburn High Road in Kilburn, London, England. Built in about 1898 to the designs of R. A. Lewcock, it retains a late Victorian interior that is rated three stars by the Campaign for Real Ale (CAMRA), denoting an interior of "outstanding national historic importance".

== History ==
The public house was built in about 1898 by the architect R. A. Lewcock, with the interior carved panels by Frederick T. Callcott.

On 14 May 1974, the Black Lion was designated a Grade II* listed building. It was included on the Campaign for Real Ale (CAMRA)'s National Inventory of Historic Pub Interiors before the inventory's grading system was revised. Under the revised scheme, it is rated three stars and its interior is regarded as being "of outstanding national historic importance".

A major refurbishment in 2003 altered the layout, with a surviving screen moved to its present position from its former location at right angles to the main road. Following a restoration programme completed in 2022, which included repairs to the historic plasterwork, the removal of later alterations, and the refurbishment of 11 guest rooms, the pub received CAMRA's Conservation Award at the 2023 Pub Design Awards. As of June 2026 the freehold is owned by B & B London Properties Ltd and the pub is operated by London Village Inns.

== Architecture ==
=== Exterior ===
The building occupies a corner site and is constructed of red brick with stone detailing, with a pub frontage finished in pink and grey granite beneath a slate roof. Designed in a Flemish Gothic style, it has three storeys with a later single-storey extension.

The principal frontage has four window bays and wraps around a curved corner, with a further four bays along the side elevation. The ground floor features a series of arches and entrances on both the main street and the corner. Decorative glass survives in several windows and doors.

The upper storeys are divided by brick piers and finished with a prominent cornice and parapet. Windows vary in size and arrangement, including curved and angled bays, many with decorative surrounds. At the corner, stacked curved windows rise through the upper floors and are topped by a lantern with a domed roof and weather vane.

The extension contains a large arched window and a decorative parapet. Above it is an inscription recording that the Black Lion was rebuilt in 1898.

=== Interior ===
The interior in 2023

The interior retains its original U-shaped bar serving two principal rooms, which are separated by a glass and timber screen. Although the main space was originally divided into a greater number of compartments, only one substantial screen survives. The bar counter, original bar-back, mirrored fittings and fireplaces with mirrored overmantels also remain.

The two principal rooms are notable for their decorative plasterwork, including an elaborate frieze and ornamented ceilings with moulded roundels. Similar decoration is found in the extension room, which is lit by three roof lanterns. The walls also display a series of four copper relief panels by Callcott depicting scenes associated with the earlier Black Lion and the nearby Kilburn Wells spa.

Decorative etched glass survives in a number of windows, particularly on the side elevation. The large room in the extension, now used as a restaurant, originally served as a music room. Overall, the interior retains a significant proportion of its original layout, fittings and decorative features.

== See also ==
- Grade II* listed buildings in the London Borough of Camden
