= George Tavern =

Pub and music venue in Stepney, London

Coordinates: 51.5143°N 0.0530°W

The George Tavern
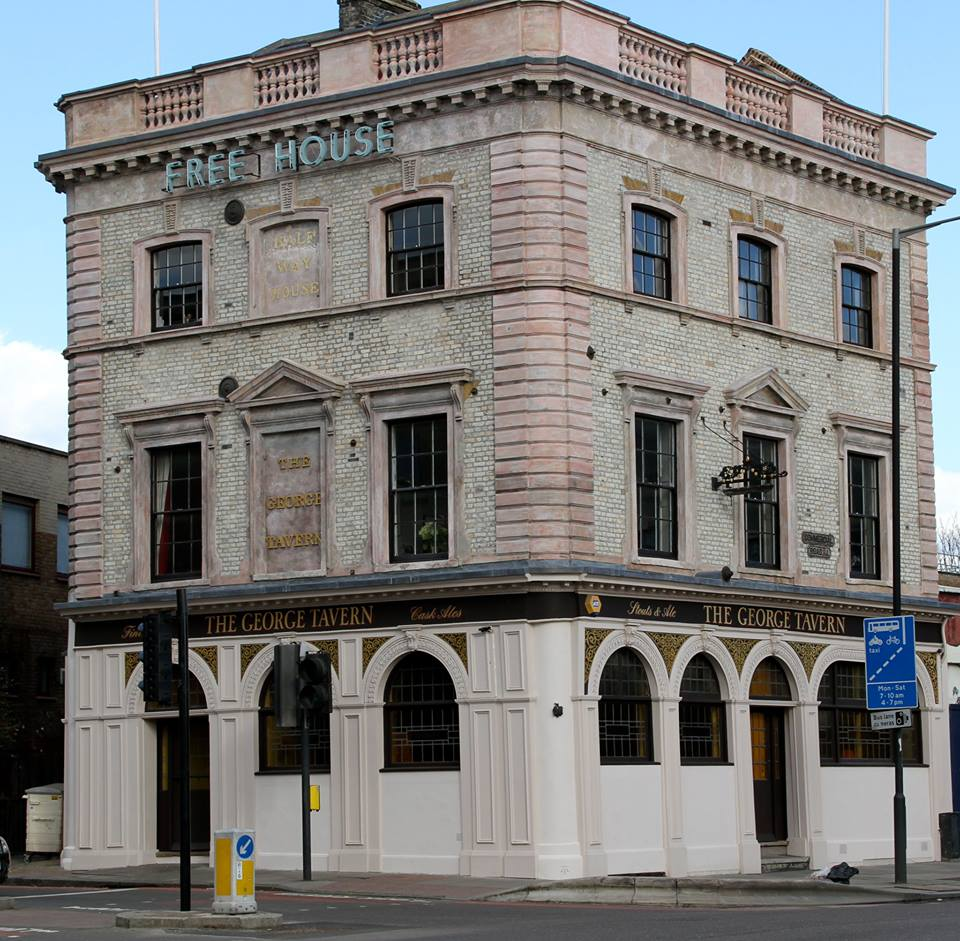
- Interactive map of The George Tavern
- Former names: Halfway House
- Location: Stepney, London, England
- Owner: Pauline Forster
- Capacity: 150
- Type: Venue, pub
- Events: Blues, rock, punk, folk, indie, alternative
- Public transit: Shadwell; Shadwell

Construction
- Opened: 1623; 403 years ago
- Reopened: 2002
- Rebuilt: after 1745, 1799-1819

Website
- thegeorgetavern.london

Listed Building – Grade II
- Designated: 27 Sep 1973
- Reference no.: 1240090

The George Tavern is a Grade II listed public house and music venue located on Commercial Road in Stepney, London. It is owned and operated by artist Pauline Forster.

Formerly known as the Halfway House, the building contains original brickwork some 700 years old, and is mentioned in texts by Geoffrey Chaucer, Samuel Pepys and Charles Dickens. In 2002, artist Pauline Forster bought the derelict building at auction and has reopened it as a music, performance and arts venue, and pub. It is also a popular location for photo, film, and video shoots.

== History ==
The George Tavern was built approximately on the site of the Halfway House, believed to be of mid-17th-century origin. Map evidence shows that the Halfway House was rebuilt in the 18th century, some time after 1745, approximately 50 yards to the north east of the earlier inn. A corner building, with the annotation 'George', appears on William Faden's Fourth Edition of Horwood's Plan map published in 1819.

The present building was probably built between 1799 and 1819 and also appears on Greenwood's map of 1827. The pub therefore forms part of the development of Commercial Road, which was created following the Commercial Road Act 1802 (42 Geo. 3. c. ci) to link the newly built East India Docks and West India Docks to the boundary of the City of London. The pub was remodelled in 1862 by James Harrison and the ground-floor pub interior was further remodelled in 1891 by R. A. Lewcock.

In the 1970s, a nightclub, Stepneys, was added in a building that backs onto the pub. The nightclub was famous for its illuminated dance floor.

The pub received Grade II listing in 1973 for the following reasons:

- A handsome corner public house with well-detailed Italianate elevations of 1862, which has strong townscape interest
- Retention of earlier features from remodelling 1820s building
- Fine ornate tiling to bar, presumed to date from the 1891 remodelling
- Group value with Nos 300 to 334 (even) opposite
- Of historic interest as a reminder of the use of the site as an inn, possibly since the 17th Century, and as part of the early 19th Century development of Commercial Road, an important historic thoroughfare from the Docklands to the city.

== Music venue and shoot location ==
Since 2002, the George Tavern has played host to a number of musical acts, including The Magic Numbers, Kodaline, John Cooper Clarke, Nick Cave, Anna Calvi, The Last Dinner Party and Sir Roger Penrose. It continues to host live music on most nights of the week.

It has also played host to a number of artists who have used the George Tavern as a photo shoot or film location. This includes Netflix's Sense8; the Sally Potter film Ginger & Rosa, MTV Bang, Plan B's film Ill Manors, Channel 4's The Morgana Show. Individual shoots with the likes of Kate Moss, Grandmaster Flash, Justin Timberlake, Adrien Brody, Grace Jones, Nick Cave, and Clean Bandit have taken place on site.

== Property development dispute ==
In 2002, Pauline Forster purchased the George Tavern at auction. The original plot was split at auction, with the nightclub Stepneys being sold to a landlord, who then sold it to Swan Housing Association.

In 2008, Forster became involved with a dispute with property developer Swan Housing Association, and this dispute continues into 2016.

Details about this matter are at Pauline Forster's dispute.

== Awards ==
In October 2008, The George Tavern was runner-up in the Stella Artois "Love Your Local Campaign", a competition to find London's best loved pubs and highlight the struggling pub industry.
