= Nina's Hair Parlour =

Vintage makeup and hair salon in London

Coordinates: 51°31′27.72″N 0°10′7.2″W

Nina's Hair Parlour was a vintage makeup and hair salon established in 2005 by Nina Butkovich-Budden. It was based in Marylebone, London, England.

Nina Butkovich-Budden, a Croatian national, began specialising in vintage hair while working at the Cut and Clipper, a small salon on The Cut, Waterloo. Butkovich-Budden quickly established media interest, which in turn generated more customers. Eventually larger premises were needed as the small salon could no longer cope with demand.

Butkovich-Budden teamed up with the makeup artist Issidora, in June 2008 and the pair opened a bigger salon in Alfie's Antique Market in Marylebone. The salon's interior was designed to emulate the salons of the 1950s, with original chair-mounted hairdryers and pistachio-coloured walls. Home to a small hair and makeup museum, it was often hired for filming and fashion photo shoots. Butkovich-Budden and Issidora work closely with hair and makeup brands Oribe and Cosmetics à La Carte.

Butkovich-Budden was interviewed on BBC Radio 4's Woman's Hour alongside Nicky Clarke and her entire team appeared on the BBC's Children In Need show Celebrity Scissorhands alongside Lee Stafford and Steve Strange, as vintage hair and makeup experts.

Issidora and Butkovich-Budden were instrumental in integration of freelance fashion industry makeup and hair artists into the BECTU union. After a two-year-long campaign and contribution from the freelancers across the United Kingdom, rate card was published for the first time on the BECTU website in November 2015.

They continue to work on BBC documentary programs creating makeup and hair styling.
