= Pauline Forster =

English artist, performer and musician

Pauline Forster (born 1949, Carlisle) is an English artist, performer, musician, designer and landlady of The George Tavern in the East End of London. She was previously known under the name Wilson-Copp. She is best known for her Dog On performance, a mirrored Ford Capri outside the Tate Modern on its opening day, 8 May 2000.

== Biography ==
=== Early life and education ===
Pauline Forster was born in Carlisle, Cumbria in 1949, daughter of Jack Forster and Meg Arbury, the fourth of six siblings. They lived a feral, poverty stricken life until Pauline was 9 when they moved to Gloucestershire. Enterprising from an early age Pauline had her first market stall at 6.

Leaving home at 16 Pauline went to Gloucester College of Art and was initially given a place at Falmouth College of Arts. However, her declared dyslexia prevented her from gaining the necessary grade in English and the place was subsequently refused.

Pauline settled in Stroud and went on to marry and have five sons. After her divorce, she started an Access programme in Art in 1998 and went on to study Fine Art at Cheltenham College of Art in 2000. In 2003, she bought The George Tavern. Pauline was diagnosed with breast cancer in 2004. She currently lives and works at The George Tavern, Stepney.

=== Career ===
==== Handmade by Pauline Forster ====
After the disappointment of not being allowed to carry on her art education Pauline was penniless and had to turn to her enterprising abilities. She collected old scraps of leather and created Handmade by Pauline Forster in 1969, a clothing and accessory label. She took her hippy-style products from Kings Road to the Isle of Wight Festival and always sold out. The business grew over time and her products were stocked by Harrods and were included in the Queen's Christmas crackers as prizes for many years. Pauline sold Handmade by Pauline Forster in 1994.

==== Guerilla Art ====
While at Cheltenham College Forster created the first of her notorious performance art pieces. Dog On was a clamped, mirrored Capri which Forster slept in for three nights outside the Tate Modern starting on the day of its grand opening. The work courted much media attention with features in most of the daily newspapers. The work was to challenge the YBA/Brit Art scene that was dogged by elitism. On the night before the Queen was visiting the Tate Modern Pauline was woken up by MI5, who threw her onto the streets with no shoes or money and impounded the car as the piece was considered a "security risk". Branded as an "art terrorist" Pauline was adamant; "I am not an anarchist, I'm an artist", she told one paper.

Forster has gone on to create an untitled performance where she walked through the streets of Cheltenham dusting the trail and herself in flour; the film was shown in Leicester Square as part of an Arts Festival. In 2002 Pauline squatted a Balti house in Brick Lane and opened an exhibition entitled London's Burning where she laid out hundreds of carbonised bagels and loaves. In 2003 Forster took her Capri onto the streets of London on the day the congestion charge was brought into effect. She had the car pulled by six women from east London to Trafalgar Square while rose petals and the dawn chorus came from the interior.

== Exhibitions and Performances ==
Date	Name	Type	Location
2000	Dog On	Site specific performance	The Tate Modern
2000	One Woman Show.	Performance	Cheltenham Art Centre
2000	Mummy has to go to bed – she needs to sometimes.	Performance	Cheltenham College of Art
2000	Untitled (flour performance)	Performance	291 Gallery
2001	The Boat Performance	Sonic performance	Trinity buoy Wharf
2001	Photographic Exhibition	Photography	Sweden
2002	London's Burning	Installation	Brick Lane
2002	Last Performance.	Multi-media	Stroud Slad Farm.
2003	Escamping	Performance	Red Gate Gallery
2006	The Recovery Room with Toby Penrose	Drawings	The George Tavern
2006	Bar Orchestra	Sonic performance	The George Tavern
2006	Golden Organic Fucking Rocks	Sonic performance with Toby Penrose and Selfish Cunt	100 Club
2007	Dragging The Plank	Performance	City of London
2011	Dog On	Joe Rush's Mutoid Waste Company Group show The Unfair ground	Glastonbury 2011

== The George Tavern ==
Pauline purchased The George Tavern in 2003. The Georgian public house (formerly The Halfway House) is situated in the East End of London in Stepney and is a Grade II listed building. Pauline has built up The Georges reputation as a top music, performance and art venue, and a location for film and advertising.

Acts that have played at The George include John Cooper Clarke, Evan Dando, Pete Doherty, Snow Patrol, Duran Duran and Nick Cave.

=== Property dispute ===
The George Tavern launched a campaign in 2008 to stop a development attached to the historic building. The campaign was supported by several national celebrities.

=== Mark Blanco ===
A play produced by Forster, Accidental Death of an Anarchist, was due to launch at The George Tavern in December 2006, when lead actor Mark Blanco died in suspicious circumstances. The case was covered in the news, with Forster commenting that the police weren't doing anything to investigate the death.

Forster opened The Mark Blanco Theatre at The George Tavern in March 2007.

== East London Advertiser ==
Since February 2008 Pauline Forster has written a fortnightly column for Newspaper of The Year East London Advertiser. Entitled "In My Words" Pauline's column is about topical local issues ranging from health care to financial crisis. Her opinionated position often causes debate.
