= Frederick T. Callcott =

British sculptor and artist

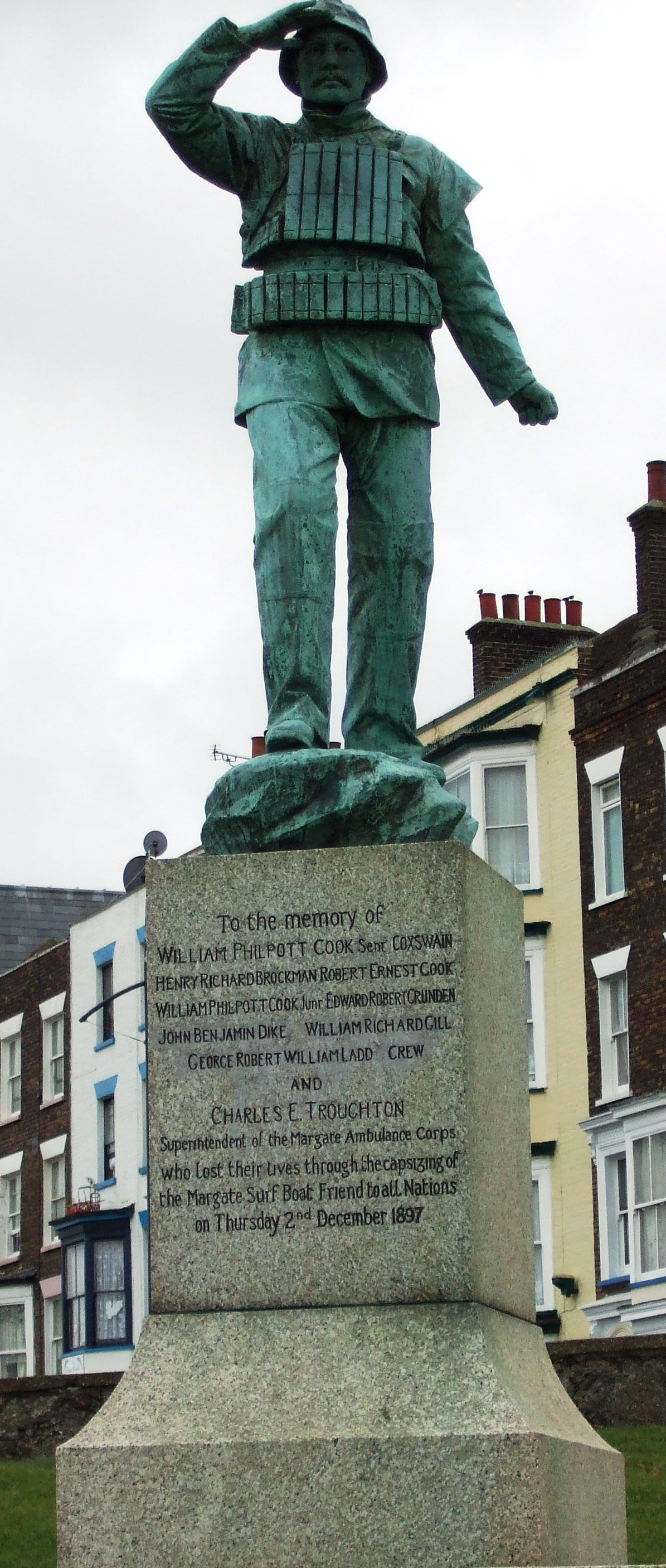
1899 Memorial to the crew of Friend to all Nations, Margate

Frederick Thomas Callcott (1854 – 11 May 1923) was a British sculptor and artist.

== Early life ==
Frederick Thomas Callcott was born in St Clement Danes, London, the son of Frederick Herbert Callcott. The architect, Charles William Callcott (born 1864) was his younger brother.

== Career ==
Callcott designed the interior carved panels in the Black Lion, a Grade II* listed public house at 274 Kilburn High Road, Kilburn, London.

Callcott was also responsible for some of the work in The Black Friar, Blackfriars.

In 1899, Callcott was responsible for sculpting the memorial to the nine out of a crew of 13 who died in a failed rescue attempt by the boat Friend to all Nations in Margate in 1897.

Callcott died on 11 May 1923. He was living at 17 Woodstock Road, Golders Green, London, but died in St Leonards on Sea, Sussex.

== Personal life ==
Callcott married fellow sculptor, Florence Newman (1867–1938) on 9 April 1912 in All Saints, St John's Wood, London.
