= R. A. Lewcock =

British architect

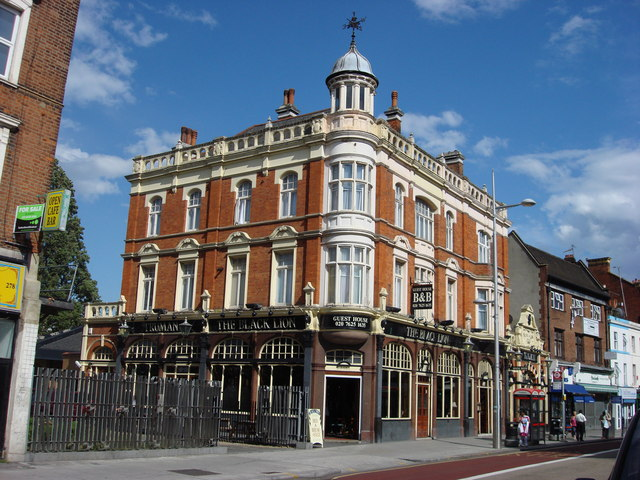
The Black Lion

Robert Alexander Lewcock (1846–1932) was a British architect.

Lewcock was the architect responsible for the Black Lion, a Grade II* listed public house at 274 Kilburn High Road, Kilburn, London. It is on the Campaign for Real Ale's National Inventory of Historic Pub Interiors.

It was built in about 1898, with the interior carved panels by Frederick T Callcott, with whom Lewcock worked on a number of projects.
