= Whitehill Wood =

Whitehill Wood may refer to:

- Whitehill Wood, Aberdeenshire
- Whitehill Wood, Ayrshire
- Whitehill Wood, Monmouthshire
- Whitehill Wood, Oxfordshire
- Whitehill Wood, South Lanarkshire
- Whitehill Wood, Warwickshire
- Whitehills Woods, County Durham
