= Cavalry Barracks, Hounslow =

Former British Army installation in London

- Hounslow
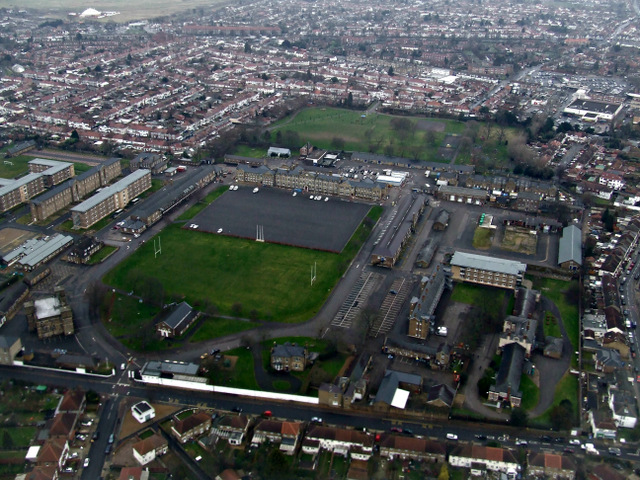
- Aerial view of Cavalry Barracks, Hounslow

Site information
- Type: Barracks
- Owner: Ministry of Defence
- Operator: British Army

Location
- Location within Greater London
- Coordinates: 51°28′10″N 00°23′21″W

Site history
- Built: 1793
- Built for: War Office
- In use: 1793–2021

Cavalry Barracks is a former British Army installation located north of Hounslow Heath in Hounslow, west London. Hounslow was one of 40 new barracks established around the country in the wake of the French Revolution, to guard against the dual threats of foreign invasion and domestic sedition. The barracks later became a busy depot for the London military district. The barracks have been described by Historic England as 'one of the most significant and complete barracks in the country'; as of June 2021 the site is scheduled to be developed as a sustainable living project by Hounslow Council.

== History ==
The area around Hounslow Heath has been used for centuries to garrison armies of the Crown, because of its proximity to London, Windsor Castle and Hampton Court Palace. In the 17th century, Oliver Cromwell marshalled an army on the heath at the end of the English Civil War in 1647. James II also camped his troops here to hold military exercises in an unsuccessful attempt to intimidate the Parliament in London shortly before the Glorious Revolution.

=== 18th century ===
In 1793, the area became a permanent barracks for troops using the heath when permanent buildings were erected as part of the British response to the threat of the French Revolution. The establishment of large Army barracks inland (rather than as part of the nation's coastal defences) was a novelty in England which, up until this time, had been resisted; people (remembering James II) objected not just to the idea of barracks but to the whole concept of a standing army . A change of policy came about, however, after the French Revolution, when fears of a French invasion were matched by fears of home-grown insurrection. In 1792, plans were drawn up by Pitt's government for six barracks, strategically placed on the outskirts of provincial industrial towns, to house cavalry units which could, if required, be mobilised to maintain public order. A seventh was built on the outskirts of London, at Hounslow. These barracks all shared common features: troopers were accommodated in first-floor barrack rooms above the stables, which were arranged in two long blocks either side of a parade ground, while officers were quartered in a separate building in the centre (a departure from the earlier English tradition whereby officers' quarters were adjacent to and adjoining those of the men).

=== 19th century ===
In 1818, the War Department (prompted by concerns at the effect of a recent inclosure act on the availability of public open space) acquired some 300 acres (120 ha) of Hounslow Heath to serve as a training ground. In August that year, the Prince Regent conducted a review of the troops of the 12th Lancers and the Royal Horse Artillery on the Heath; one of many similar reviews that took place there over the years.

Florence Nightingale undertook some of her early training at Hounslow.

In June 1846, Private Frederick John White was flogged after a court-martial sentenced him to 150 lashes for insubordination at Hounslow Barracks. He died a month later, making him the last soldier to die after a flogging in the British Army. White was buried in nearby St Leonard's churchyard, Heston. Calls for abolition of flogging were made in Parliament; it was eventually outlawed in 1881.

==== Expansion ====
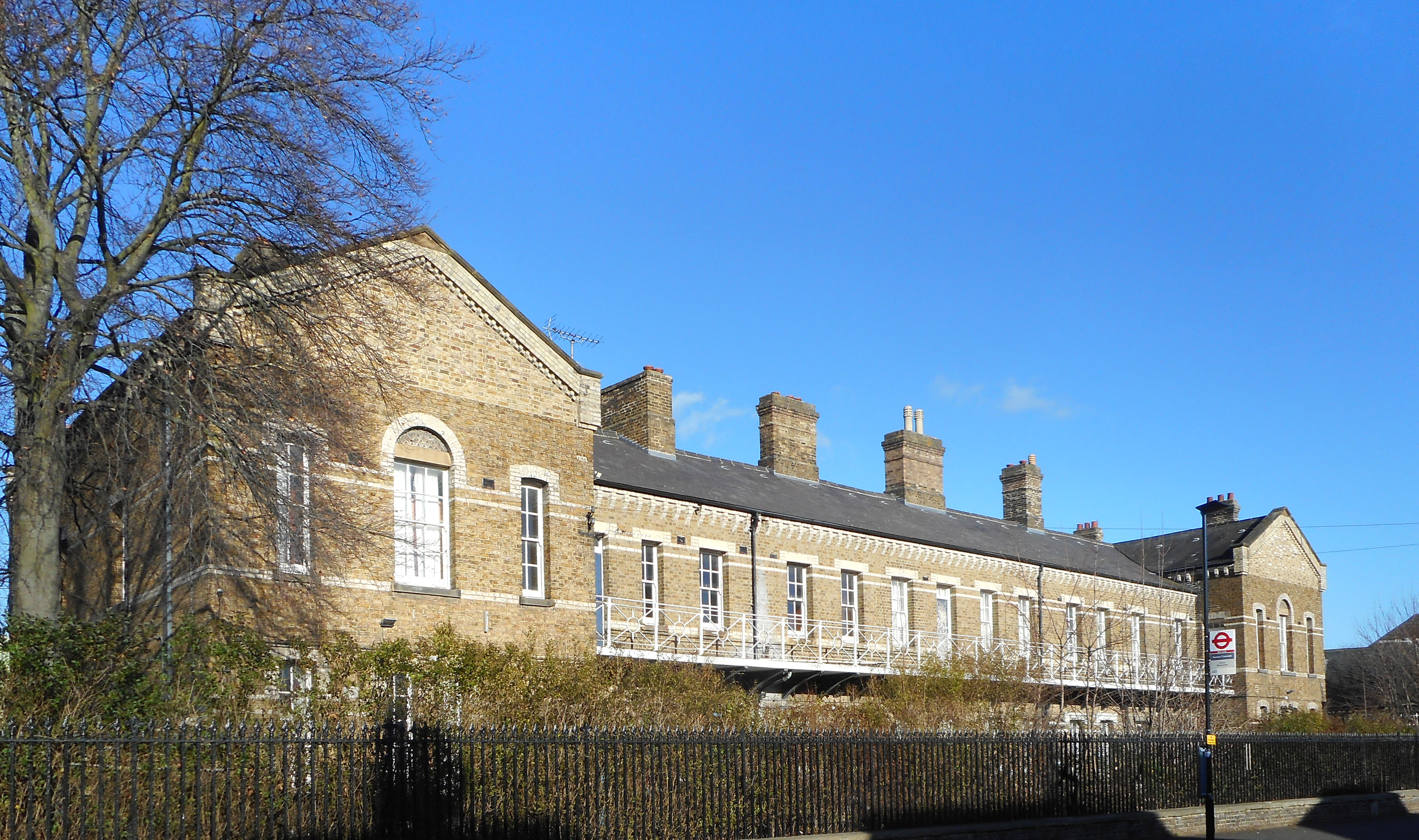
Fusiliers' Block of 1876, built as part of the expansion of the site.

In 1873, a system of recruiting areas based on counties was instituted under the Cardwell Reforms, and the barracks became the depot for the two battalions of the 7th Regiment of Foot, and the site was significantly expanded to create infantry barracks alongside the cavalry accommodation. In 1875, the barracks also became the depot for the 57th (West Middlesex) Regiment of Foot and the 77th (East Middlesex) Regiment of Foot. Following the Childers Reforms, the 57th and 77th regiments amalgamated to form the Middlesex Regiment and the 7th Foot became the Royal Fusiliers. Both the Royal Fusiliers and the Middlesex Regiment had their depots in the barracks in 1881.

By 1884, the barracks had its own railway station on the newly created District Railway (later part of the London Underground – today the line and station are part of the Piccadilly line branch to Heathrow Airport). In My Early Life, Winston Churchill recalls travelling by rail to Hounslow Barracks two or three times a week whilst living at his mother's house in Knightsbridge, around 1896.

=== 20th century ===
The Middlesex Regiment relocated from Hounslow Barracks to the newly built Inglis Barracks in 1905. During the First World War, the barracks was, among other things, headquarters of the Officer Commanding No 10 District, Eastern Command (a district comprising the counties of Kent, Middlesex, Surrey and Sussex, as well as the garrison town of Woolwich (excluding Territorial troops)). Between the wars, as well as being the depot of the Royal Fusiliers, Cavalry Barracks continued to house a succession of different regiments of horse. The last horsed cavalry regiment to be stationed at Hounslow was the Royal Scots Greys, which departed in 1938.

During World War II, the barracks served as Headquarters, Eastern Command from 1939 to 1941, General Headquarters of the Home Forces from 1941 to 1944, and again Headquarters, Eastern Command from 1944 (continuing so until 1968). Over the course of the war, many different regiments or units were stationed or billeted at the barracks. On 2 January 1940, work began on converting 27 acres (11 ha) of adjacent farmland into a hutted camp (Beavers Lane Camp), with additional accommodation for 1500 troops. The farm buildings were used as MT offices and sheds. In late 1941, the 70th Battalion the Middlesex Regiment moved into Hounslow Cavalry Barracks. Known as the "Young Soldiers Battalion", because they were all 18- and 19-year-old volunteers, they remained there at the barracks until they moved over the road into Beavers Lane Camp in 1942. Hounslow was the first time the troops had been formed together as a battalion since their formation in May 1940, having been scattered in small units in and around London guarding Vulnerable Points (VPs).

After the Second World War, the barracks continued to serve as Headquarters Eastern Command until 1968 (although a separate underground 'War Headquarters' was established at Wilton Park in 1954). The Royal Fusiliers vacated their section of the barracks in 1949 (having had their depot there since the 1870s). In 1968, with the disestablishment of Eastern Command, the barracks became Headquarters, Southern Command, with Lieutenant-General David Peel Yates (the last Commander-in-Chief, Eastern Command) remaining at Hounslow as Commander-in-Chief, Southern Command. Until the 1970s, Cavalry Barracks was also home to the (Army's) West London Communication Centre and the Hounslow Regimental Pay Office manned by members of the Royal Army Pay Corps (whose predecessors had been at Hounslow since at least the early 1900s).

From 1981 to 1986, Cavalry barracks was the home of the 1st battalion the Grenadier Guards. During their stay, they mounted public duties in London and Windsor. They were also responsible for providing military support to the civilian services at Heathrow Airport at the time of high terrorist threat from the IRA. The Battalion also deployed from Hounslow to South Armagh in Northern Ireland. Then the 2nd Bn Scots Guards were there until 1992, carrying out regular public duties, then moving to Redford Barracks in Edinburgh.

=== 21st century ===
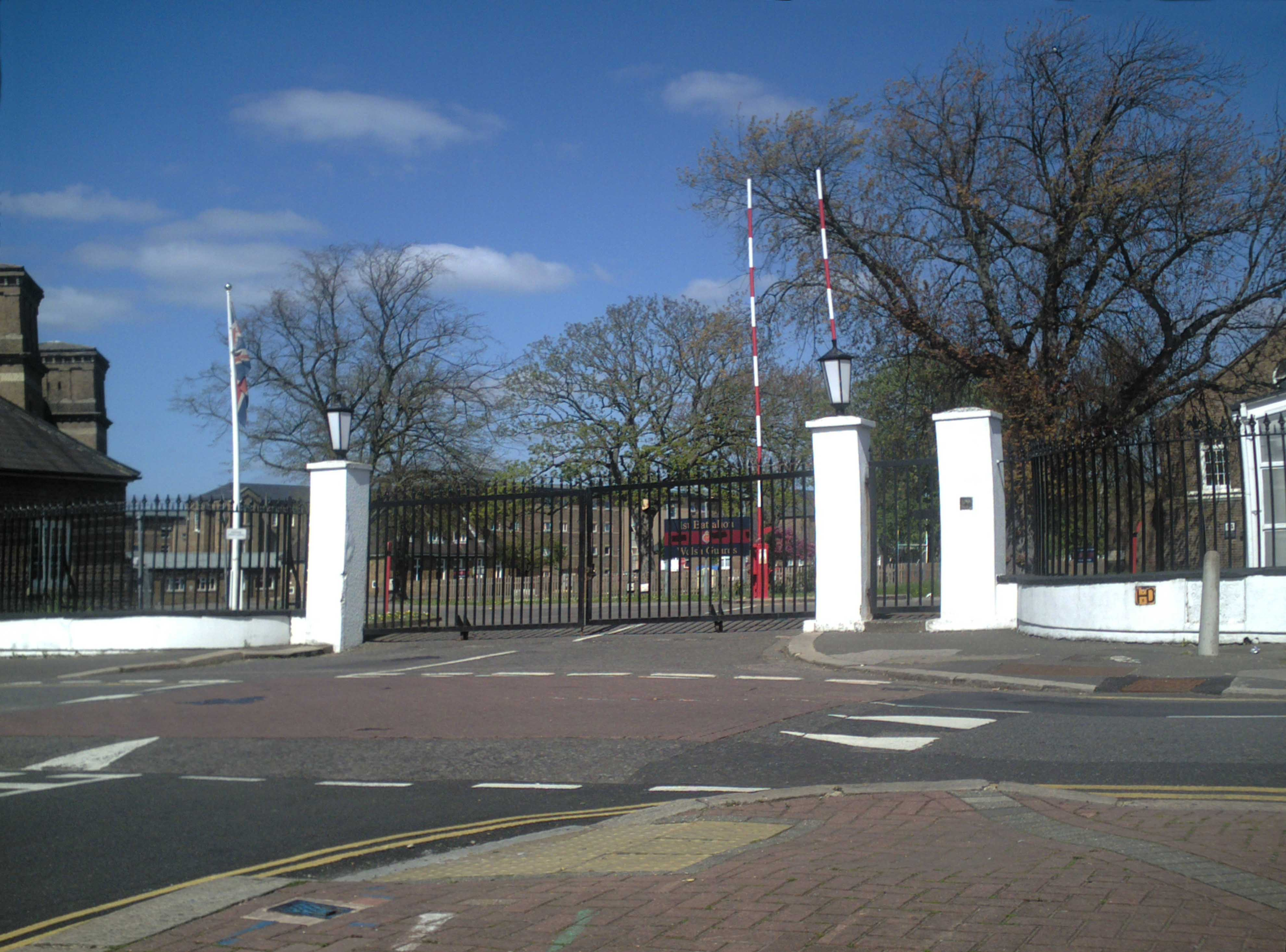
View through the main gate, with the Keep just visible to the left.

In 2007, MPs expressed concern in a report that some of the Victorian buildings at Cavalry Barracks were so bad that troops staying in tented camps in Afghanistan had better living conditions than those at Hounslow. Between March 2010 and mid-2011, the Ministry of Defence built 396 en-suite bed spaces in six new accommodation blocks to house 354 junior ranks and 42 for senior non-commissioned officers under their SLAM (single living accommodation modernisation) project to improve military accommodation. In 2011, the 1st Battalion Welsh Guards moved into the barracks, remaining there for three and a half years, after which the 1st Battalion Irish Guards was stationed there from 2015.

==== Closure ====
In November 2016, the Ministry of Defence announced that the site would close in 2020. This was later extended to 2021, and the 1st Battalion Irish Guards moved to their new home at Aldershot Garrison in June 2021, while the barracks, acquired by Hounslow Council, will be developed as a sustainable living project.

== Architecture ==
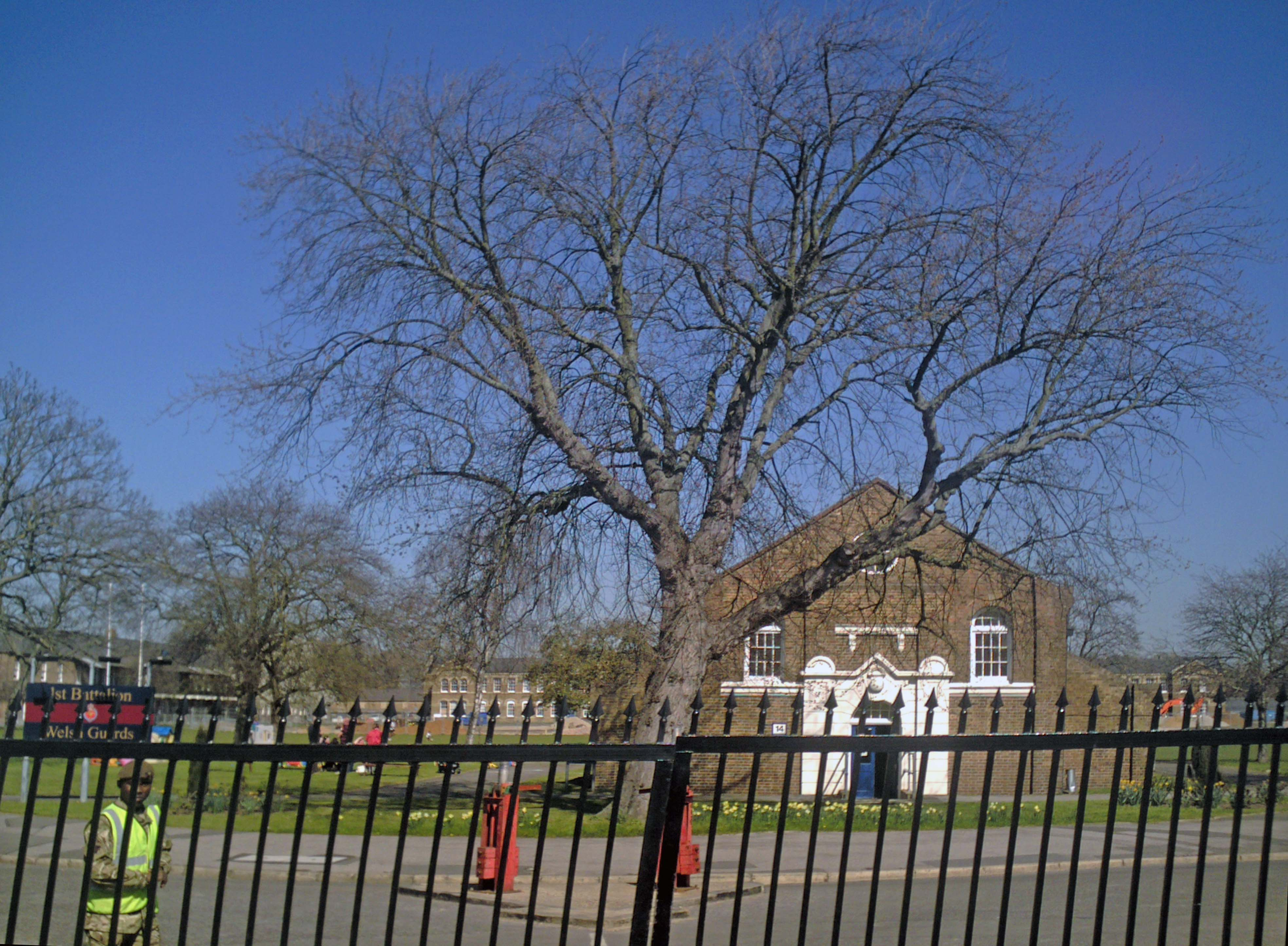
Former barracks Chapel, dating from 1845.

The barracks is a walled enclave. The essence of its 18th-century layout is largely preserved, with both original and later buildings formally dispersed around the large central parade ground. The site contains 14 Grade II listed buildings and a further 19 locally listed buildings.

Hounslow is the only surviving example of the seven large cavalry barracks that were built close to major English towns and cities in the 1790s. They were all designed, along similar lines, by the architect James Johnson, with the three principal buildings arranged on three sides of the parade ground: the officers' quarters as the focal point, opposite the main gate, and on either side a parallel pair of long two-storey barrack blocks, accommodating both horses (downstairs) and soldiers (upstairs). At Hounslow, small coach houses (later used for forage) were provided at each end of the stable blocks, and to the east of the main square (in line with the officers' quarters) was a riding school and a hospital. Apart from one of the four coach houses, all these buildings have survived at Hounslow (albeit altered over time, in particular the Riding School ('almost unrecognisable' following its conversion into workshops for the Royal Engineers) and the Officers' Quarters which were enlarged (to incorporate a new Officers' Mess) and re-fronted in 1876 as part of the barracks expansion).

In the wake of the Crimean War, a Commission for Improving Barracks and Hospitals was set up (under the chairmanship of Sidney Herbert, a close associate of Florence Nightingale). A number of its recommendations were promptly enacted at Hounslow: In 1860, separate quarters for married soldiers were provided in a three-storey building with single-room apartments for 42 families; it is one of the earliest examples of purpose-built accommodation for married soldiers. The following year, the 18th-century barrack blocks were provided with verandas, as a means of providing greater ventilation for the upper floors, where troopers slept eight to a room; Lothian Nicholson was the architect for these and other alterations. In 1862, a new hospital building was erected, east of the main parade ground; (at the same time the old hospital was converted to serve as a Sergeants' Mess). Designed by Douglas Galton, it is a very early example (possibly the first in the country) of a hospital built according to his pioneering pavilion principle, later seen in his influential Herbert Hospital design.

With the establishment at Hounslow of a double Regimental Depot in the 1870s, land to the west was purchased, and several new buildings were erected, designed by Colonel C. B. Ewart, R.E. in line with national recommendations. Most prominent among these was the four-storey Armoury (or 'Keep'), which stands near the main entrance; similarly monumental is the Hardinge Block, one of the largest examples of the type of barracks block being built in new Regimental Depots all round the country at the time (it was formerly one of a parallel pair; the second block, 'Marlborough', was demolished in the late 1960s). Other surviving buildings of this period include the combined former canteen, reading room and sergeants' mess, the Barrack Master's house, the guard house by the gate, and a number of terraced houses.

In 2007-2013, the MOD upgraded the soldiers' accommodation on site by building six large four-storey 'SLAM' (Single Living Accommodation Modernisation) units. At the time of the barracks' closure, it comprised 59 buildings in total, of various ages and uses.

=== Redevelopment plans ===
In 2021, Inland Homes submitted a planning application for redevelopment of the site to provide 'new homes, public open space, commercial, leisure and community space, and much more'. Under revised proposals, the Grade II listed buildings are to be retained and restored, but ten locally listed buildings will be demolished (including the 18th-century Farrier's Shop to the left of the main entrance); another (a tin chapel) is due to be relocated. Several new residential blocks and other buildings, of up to five storeys in height, are proposed.

Inland Homes, which had been leading redevelopment through its subsidiary Hounslow Property Development Ltd (HPDL), entered administration in September 2023. HPDL itself was placed into administration in May 2024, just days after Inland confirmed it would be appointing administrators. As a result, the site was brought to market by CBRE's Residential Land team on behalf of Kroll, with the sale promoted as a prime opportunity for a multi-offer residential scheme.

The hybrid planning permission granted for the site remains valid for a limited period, typically three years from approval for detailed elements, and up to five years for outline consent, after which development must commence or risk expiration. The consent includes provision for 1,525 homes, with 35% designated affordable housing, and the retention of 23 existing buildings, including 14 Grade II-listed structures.

Despite the scale and ambition of the proposed regeneration, there have been recent concerns from local residents and community groups regarding traffic and infrastructure capacity. In particular, objections have been raised about the suitability of Beavers Lane, the primary access road to and from the site—which many consider too narrow and ill equipped to handle the projected increase in traffic volume from such the large scale development. In recent years other developments have added pressure on these roads and plans did not account for these new additions. Residents have called for careful transport planning and infrastructure upgrades to avoid congestion and better public transport links to be considered.
