= St Leonard's Church, Heston =

Coordinates: 51.485°N 0.372°W

St Leonard's Church Heston
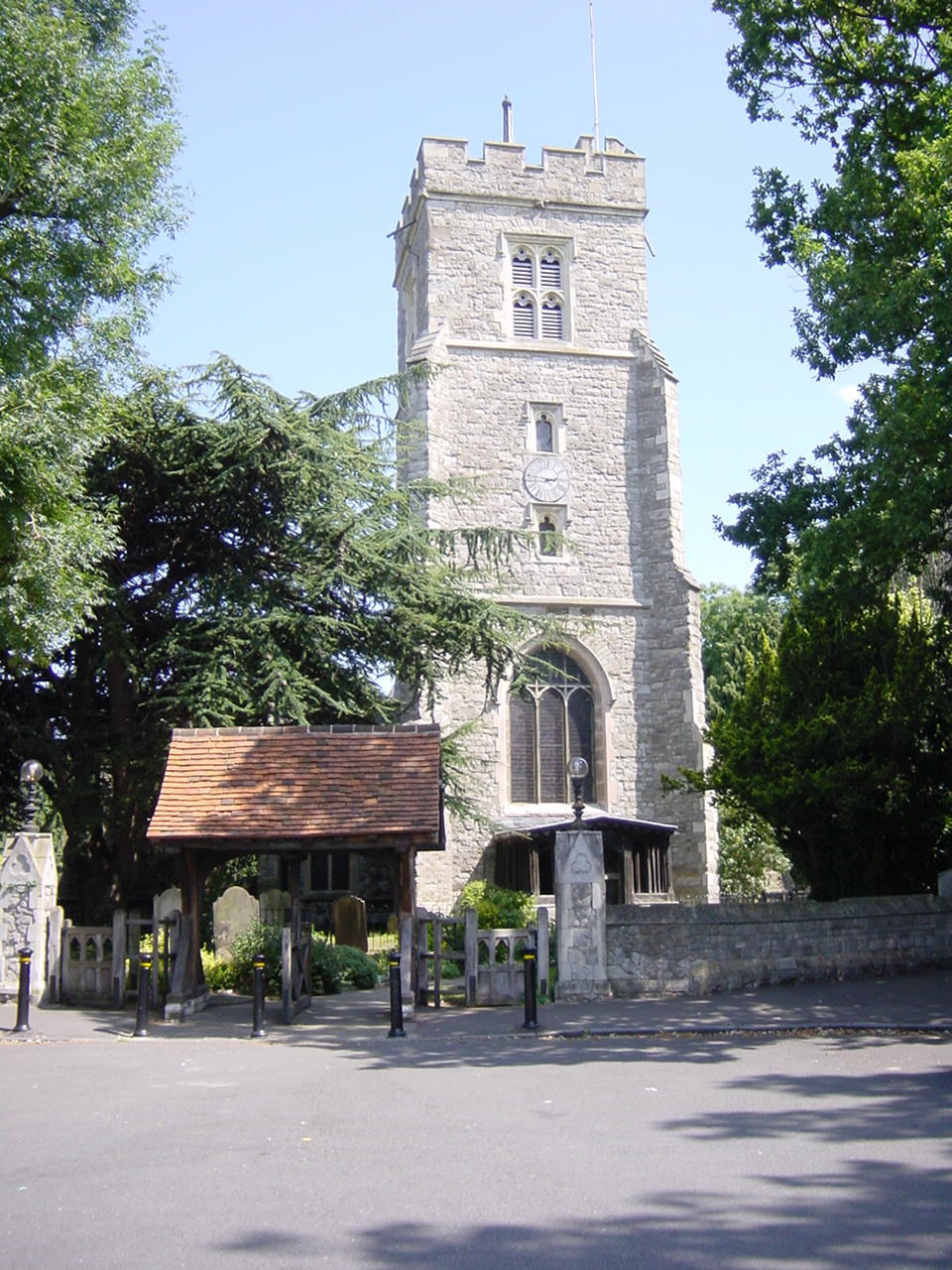
- St Leonard's Church
- St Leonard's Church Heston
- Location: Heston Road, Heston TW5 0RD, London
- Country: England
- Denomination: Church of England
- Website: parishofheston.org

History
- Status: Parish church

Architecture
- Functional status: Active

Administration
- Diocese: Diocese of London
- Archdeaconry: Archdeaconry of Middlesex
- Deanery: Hounslow
- Parish: St Leonard Heston

Clergy
- Vicar: Erica Wilding

Listed Building – Grade II*
- Designated: 15 June 1951; 74 years ago
- Reference no.: 1080340

St Leonard's Church is the Grade II* listed Church of England parish church for Heston in the London Borough of Hounslow.

== History ==
The church dates from the 14th century, though there are records of a priest in Heston in the 7th century. The Domesday Book makes no mention of Heston but in 1086 its manor was given to Walter of Saint-Valéry by William the Conqueror. The church was later given to the Abbey of Saint-Valéry.

In around 1270 Heston was made a separate parish under Richard, 1st Earl of Cornwall, the Lord of the Manor. Richard of Cornwall was King John's second son and had served in the Barons' Crusade of 1239, where he succeeded as a negotiator for the release of prisoners. As Saint Leonard is the patron saint of prisoners it is possible that Richard dedicated the church to the saint, although the exact date of the dedication is unknown.

The church tower survived the necessary rebuilding works in the 19th century, as did the lychgate. The graveyard contains the grave of Private Frederick John White, who was flogged to death at Hounslow Barracks in 1846. The outcry at the manner of his death brought about a reduction in the maximum number of lashings that could be given as punishment, and eventually the banning of the practice altogether. The naturalist Sir Joseph Banks (1743–1820) and his wife are also buried at St Leonards. (Note: Joseph Banks had a country house, Spring Grove House, now part of West Thames College in neighbouring Isleworth. His will stipulated that he wanted to be buried; "in the most private manner in the Church or Church yard of the Parish in which I shall happen to die. I entreat my dear relatives to spare themselves the affliction of attending the ceremony and I earnestly request that they will not erect any Monument to my Memory". In accordance with his wishes, there is no memorial to mark his burial site.)

== Architecture ==
The tower is Perpendicular (late medieval) and was described by Nikolaus Pevsner as 'one of the best of the Middlesex type'. It is similar to the tower of All Saints, Isleworth. It has a south-east turret, diagonal buttresses, a three-light west window and tall, two-light, transomed windows with square heads to the belfry stage. There are embattled parapets and carved gargoyles. The west porch has a four-centred outer arch and foliated spandrels. The body of the church, rebuilt in the 19th century, is in the style of c.1300. The church is a Grade II* listed building.

=== Interior ===
The arch to the tower is tall and moulded and is typical of fifteenth-century work. In the arcades between the nave and its aisles, the piers alternate between round and octagonal as was sometimes the case in medieval churches. The arcade to the outer north aisle has round piers, capitals and double chamfered arches and is said to reuse piers from the old church. The chancel arch is moulded and carried on demi-octagonal responds. The roofs to the nave, chancel and outer north aisle are of arch-braced construction. The tower and nave are divided by a modern glazed partition.

Most of the nineteenth-century pews survive, however, some were removed from the east end to accommodate the altar, which has been moved forward. Many of the monuments from the original church also survive. They include one in the Lady Chapel dedicated to Robert Child and his family, owners of Osterley Park, and designed by Robert Adam.

There is also a varied collection of stained glass, including work by C E Kempe and Heaton, Butler and Bayne.

== Gallery ==
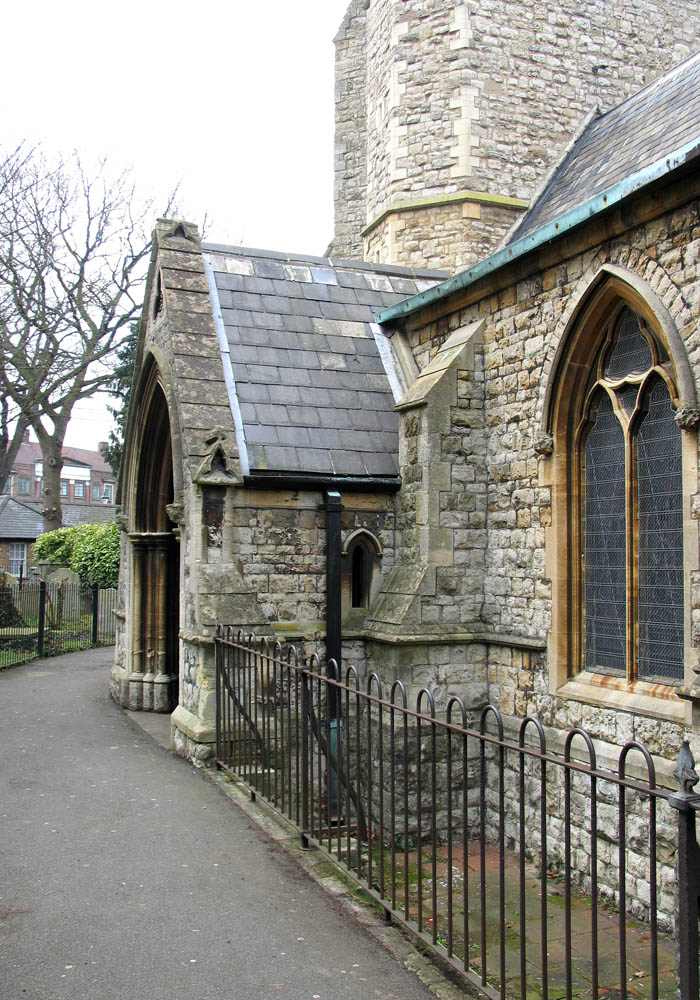
Porch

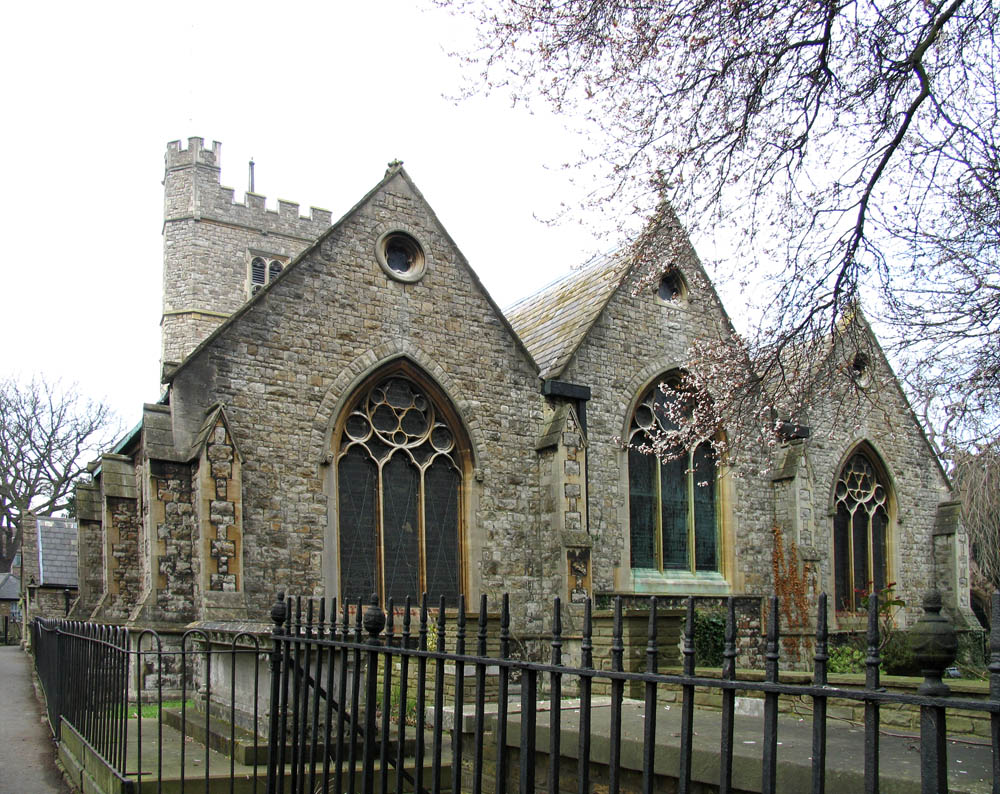
East end

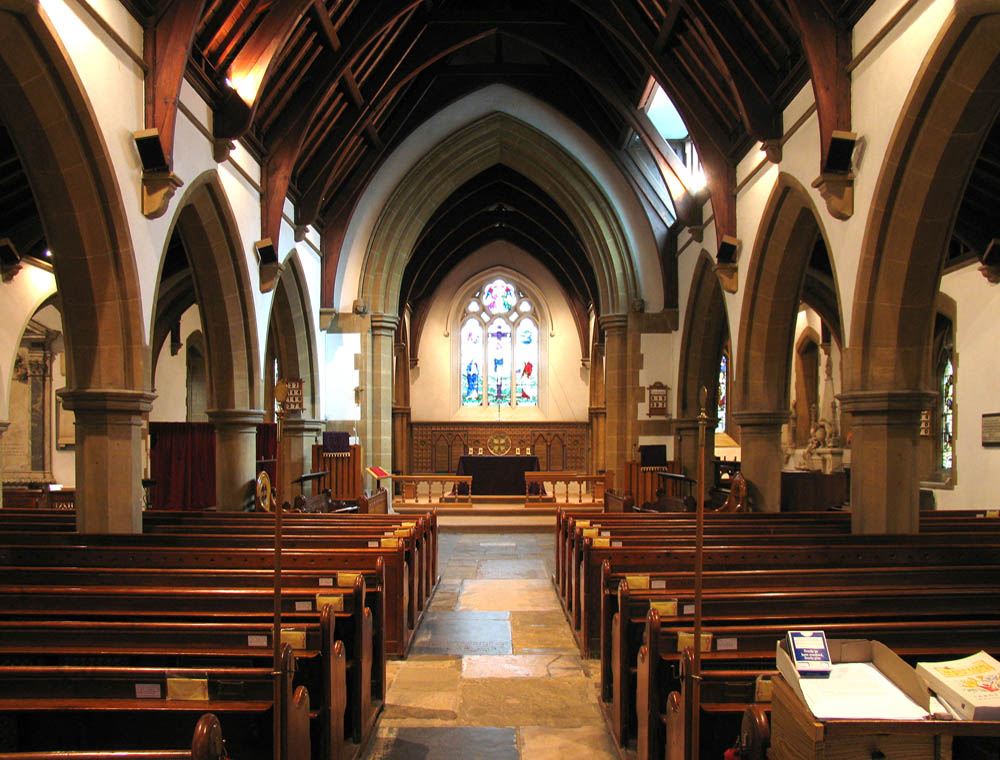
Interior

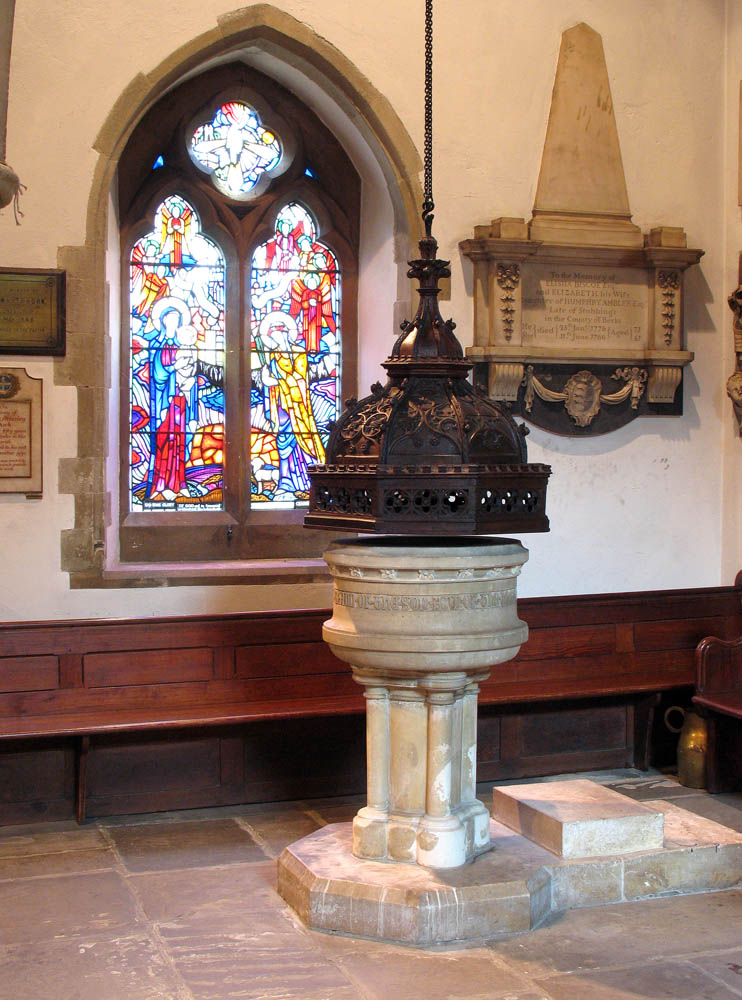
Baptismal font

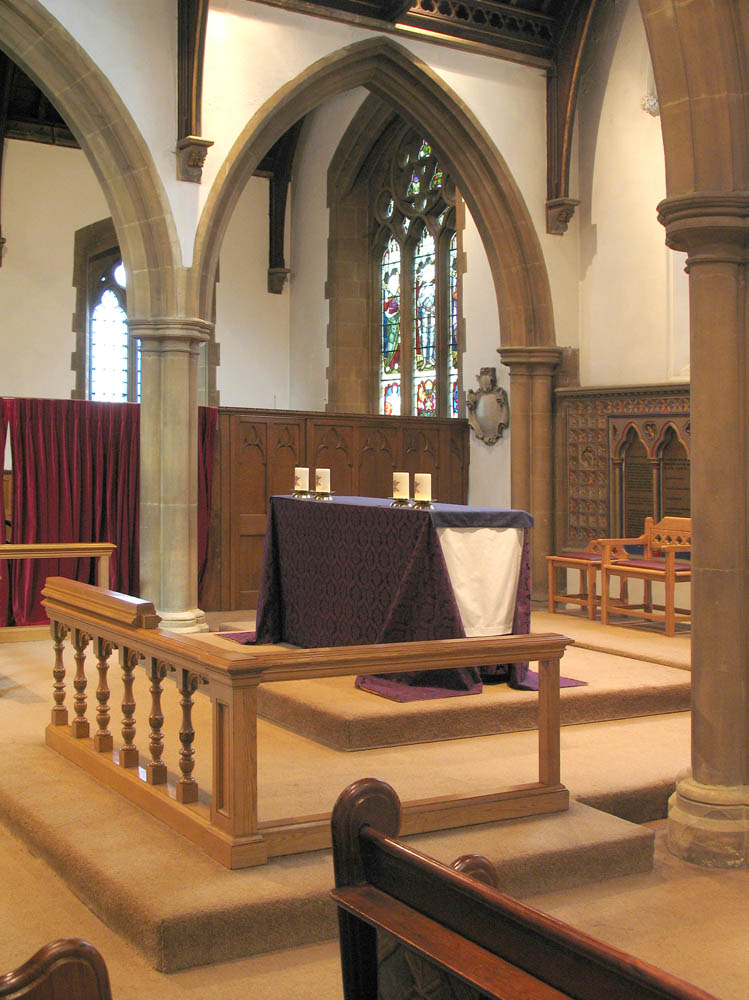
Altar

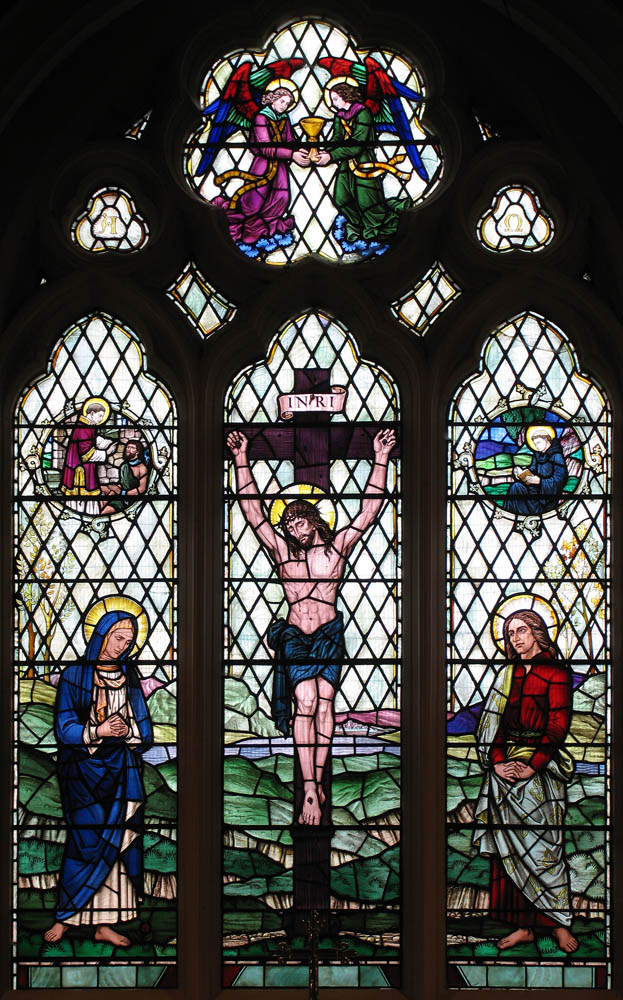
Stained glass

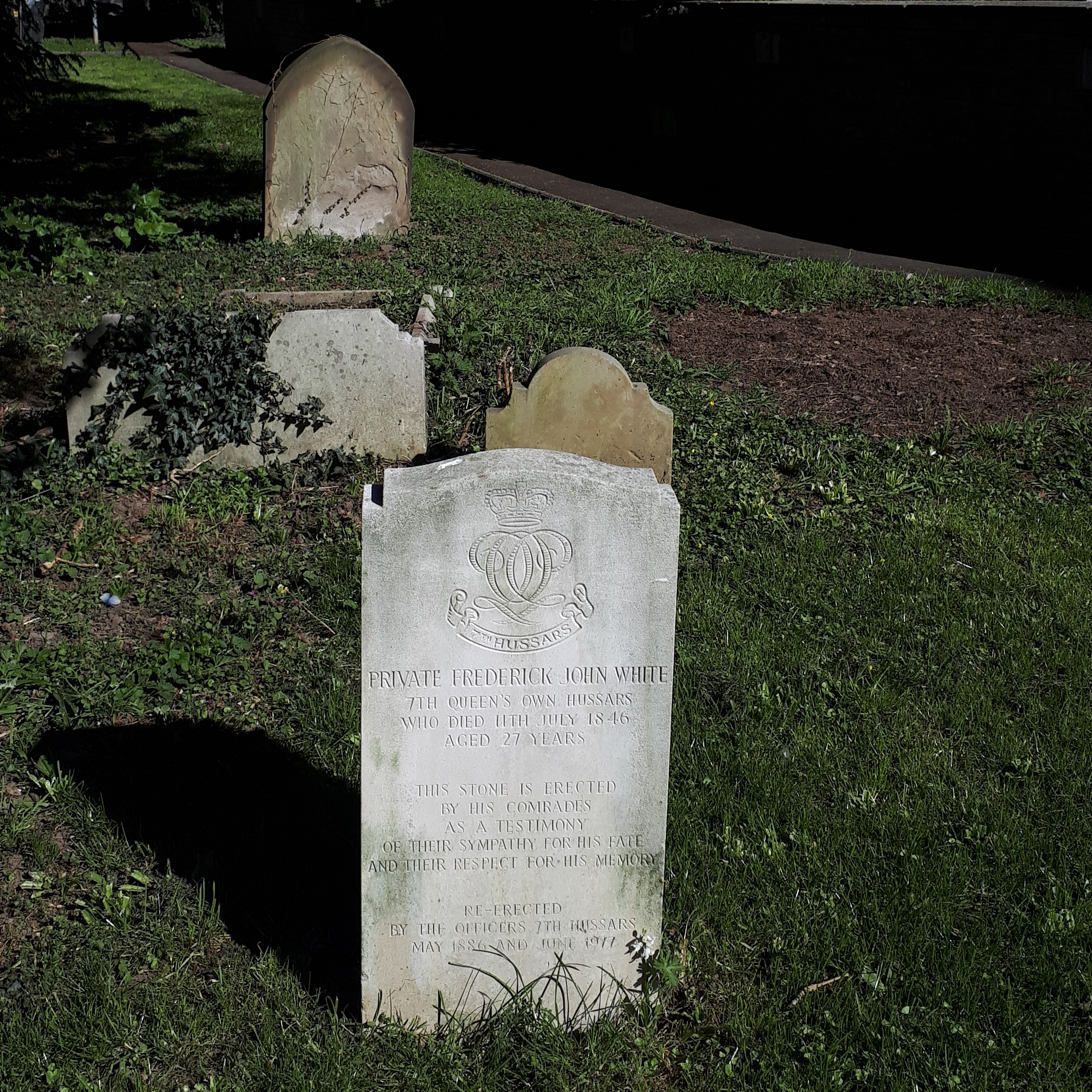
The grave of Private Frederick John White
