= William James Erasmus Wilson =

British surgeon (1809–1884)

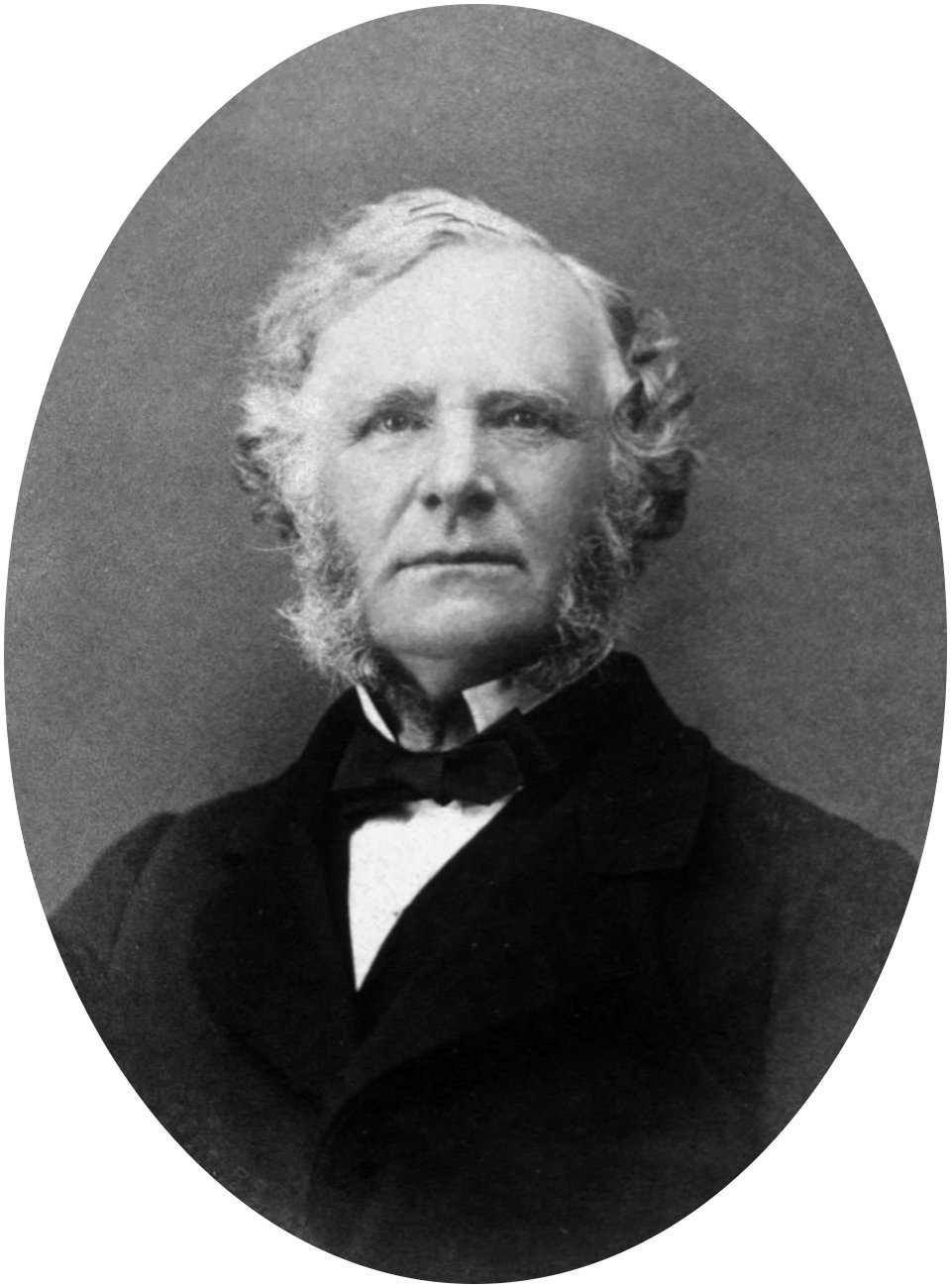
Sir Erasmus Wilson

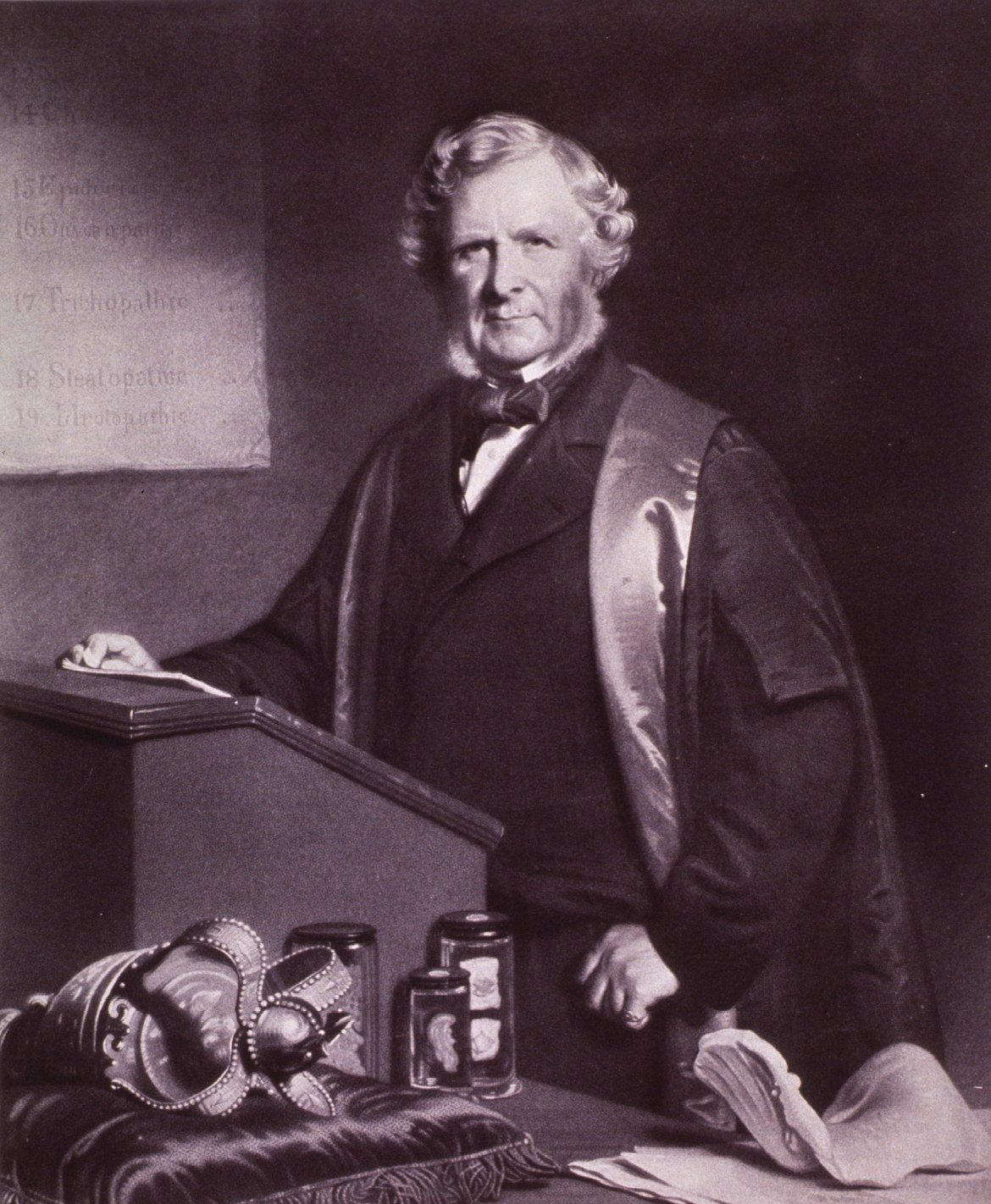

Sir William James Erasmus Wilson FRCS FRS (25 November 1809 – 7 August 1884), generally known as Sir Erasmus Wilson, was an English surgeon and dermatologist.

== Biography ==
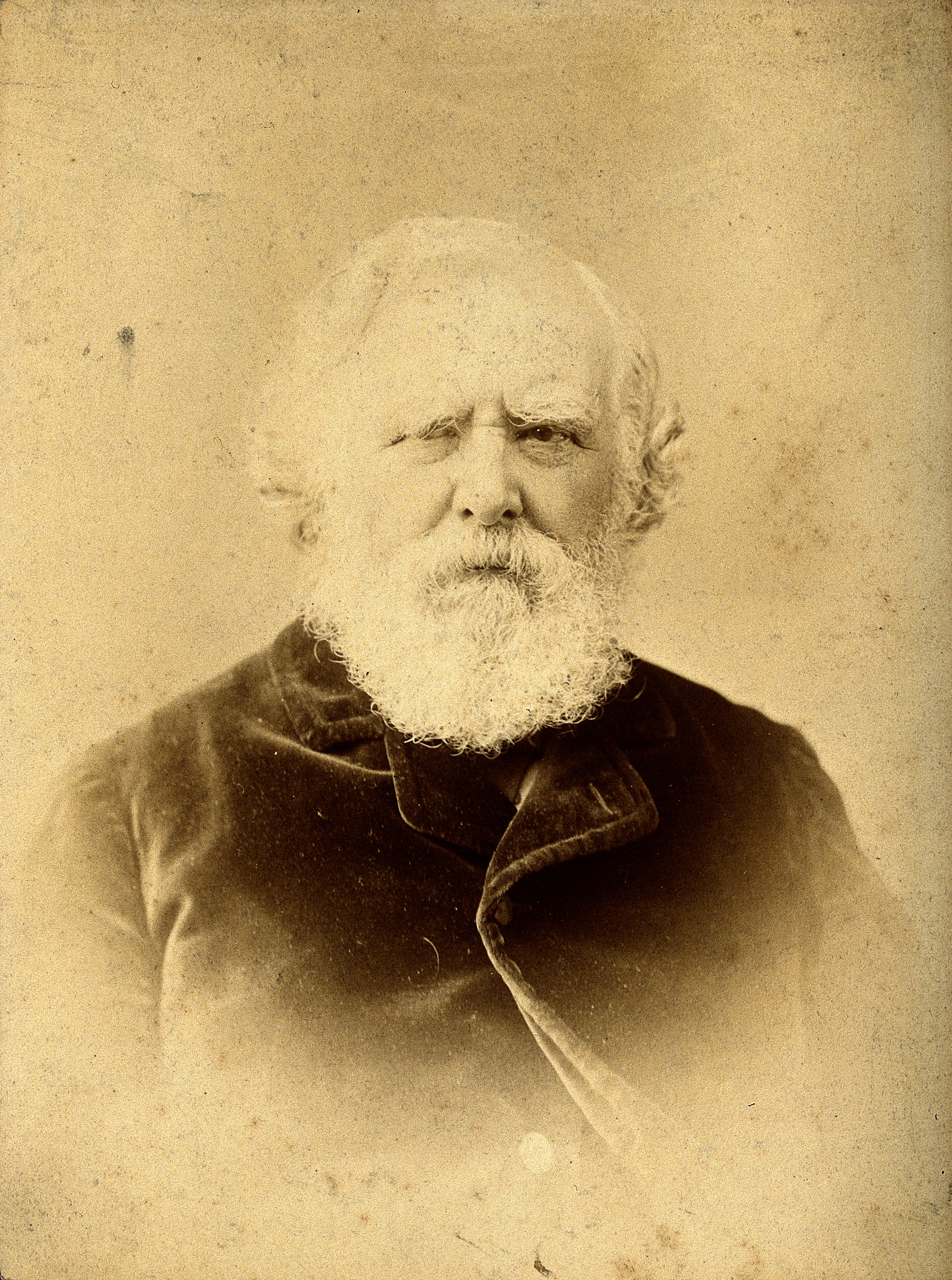
Sir William James Erasmus Wilson. Photograph by Barraud.

Wilson was born in London, studied at Dartford Grammar School before St Bartholomew's Hospital in London, and at the University of Aberdeen, and early in life became known as a skilful surgeon and dissector.

It was his sympathy with the poor of London and a suggestion from Mr. Thomas Wakley of The Lancet, of which he acted for a time as sub-editor, which first led him to take up skin diseases as a special study. The cases of scrofula, anaemia, and blood-poisoning which he saw made him set to work to alleviate the suffering of persons so afflicted, and he quickly established a reputation for treating this class of patients. It was said that he treated the rich by ordering them to give up luxuries; the poor by prescribing for them proper nourishment, which was often provided out of his own pocket. In the opinion of one of his biographers, we owe to Wilson in great measure the habit of the daily bath, and he helped very much to bring the Victorian Turkish bath into use in Great Britain, and in the process writing a number of works on spas, baths and thermo-therapy, all of which overlap in their content.

Indeed, his works on spas, baths, and thermo-therapy were directly related to his work on the health of skin. His earliest such works on this topic outlined the relationship between various applications of water, vapour baths, the action of heat and cold through such media on the action of the skin, and the relationship between this and health in general. Moreover, his works had a direct impact on the hydrotherapy movement of the time (then known as hydropathy), and the overlapping sanitary reform movement. He applauded the establishment of Public Baths and Wash-houses, as "amongst the noblest of the institutions…as they are one of the greatest discoveries of the present age", and dedicated his 1854 book Healthy Skin to another sanitary reform proponent, Edwin Chadwick "In admiration of his strenuous and indefatigable labors in the cause of Sanitary Reform".

Nor was Wilson shy of saying what needed to be said in the promotion of sanitary reform. In Metcalfe's (1877) work on sanitary reform and all the above-mentioned overlaps, he describes the Chinese vapour baths. After describing the bathing establishments as a whole, he describes the bathing room itself, "which is about thirty feet by twenty, and is filled with hot steam or vapour":

The entire floor, except a narrow space round the sides, is occupied by a hot-water bath from one to eighteen inches deep. The furnace is outside, and the flues are carried under the centre of the bath. In the hazy light of this room may be seen the perspiring Chinamen disperting themselves in the shallow water, until, when cleansed to their satisfaction, they return to the cooling room, there to regale themselves with cups of tea and pipes of tobacco. All classes of Chinese frequent these bathing establishments. Mr Ellis, in his "Journal of the Embassy to China (1816)," says of this Chinese cleansing apparatus, that it is "disgusting," but says Mr Erasmus Wilson, "What would Mr Ellis say of a country in which there existed no cleansing apparatus whatever? For example, his own.

Wilson wrote much upon the diseases which specially occupied his attention, and his books, A Healthy Skin and Student's Book of Diseases of the Skin, though they were not received without criticism at the time of their appearance, long remained text-books of their subject. He visited the East to study leprosy, Switzerland to investigate the causes of goitre, and Italy with the purpose of adding to his knowledge of the skin diseases affecting an ill-nourished peasantry.

He was knighted by Queen Victoria in 1881, and died at Westgate-on-Sea, Kent in 1884. He had married Charlotte Mary Doherty in 1841; they had no children. After the death of his wife, the bulk of his property, some £200,000, went to the Royal College of Surgeons. A statue of Eramus Wilson stands in the forecourt of the former Royal Sea Bathing Hospital Margate, on recognition of his endowments to the hospital and where the salt water immersion of patients was thought to be beneficial in line with Wilsons therapeutic recommendations. The building is now residential apartments.

== Philanthropic works ==
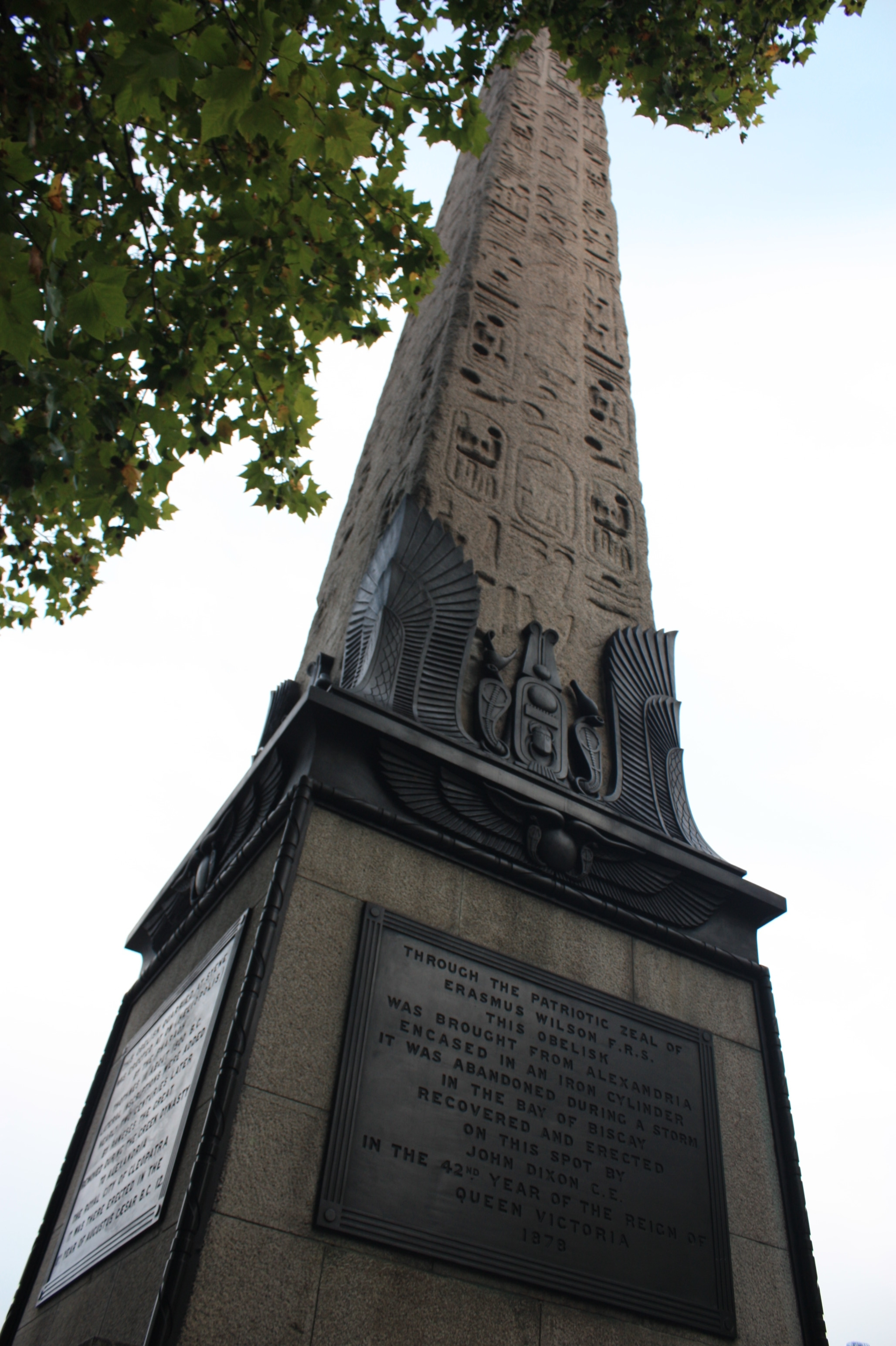
Cleopatra's Needle and the plaque to Erasmus Wilson at its base

He made a large fortune by his successful practice and by skilful investments, and since he had no family he devoted a great deal of his money to charitable and educational purposes. In 1869 he founded the chair and museum of dermatology in the Royal College of Surgeons, of which he was chosen president in 1881, and which just before his death awarded him its honorary gold medal, which had been founded in 1800 and only awarded on six previous occasions. He also founded a professorship of pathology at the University of Aberdeen and paid for the vast medical library at the Hunterian Museum, London where his bust takes pride of place at the end of the library.

In 1878 he earned the thanks of the nation on different grounds, by defraying the expense of bringing the Egyptian obelisk called Cleopatra's Needle from Alexandria to London, where it was erected on the Thames Embankment. The British Government had not thought it worth the expense of transportation. This is now one of London's best known landmarks. Erasmus Wilson was also closely associated with the Royal Medical Benevolent College in Epsom, Surrey, now Epsom College. One of the boarding houses 'Wilson House' established in 1873 is named after him and carries his name on the foundation stone located to the north east corner of the building, right of the entrance.

== Famous statements ==
1878: "When the Paris Exhibition closes, electric light will close with it and no more be heard of."

Text above was based on an entry from the 1902 edition of Britannica, It may need some updating or revision

== Published works as known ==
- Wilson, Erasmus (1838). Practical and Surgical Anatomy. London: Longman, Orme, Brown, Green, & Longmans. Full text at Internet Archive (archive.org)
- Wilson, Erasmus (1845). The Anatomist's Vade Mecum: A System of Human Anatomy (3rd ed.). London: John Churchill. Full text at Internet Archive (archive.org)
- Wilson, Erasmus (1849). On The Management of the Skin as a Means of Promoting and Preserving Health (3rd ed.). London: John Churchill. Full text at Internet Archive (archive.org)
- Wilson, Erasmus (1852). Fifteen Plates for the third edition of Wilson on the Skin. Philadelphia: Blanchard & Lea. Full text at Internet Archive (archive.org)
- Wilson, Erasmus (1852). On Syphilis, Constitutional and Hereditary; and on Syphilitic Eruptions. Philadelphia: Blanchard & Lea. Full text at Internet Archive (archive.org)
- Wilson, Erasmus (1854). Healthy Skin: A Popular Teatise on the Skin and Hair, their Preservation and Management (2nd American, from the 4th Revised London ed.). Philadelphia: Blanchard & Lea. Full text at Internet Archive (archive.org)
- Wilson, Erasmus (1856). William Hunt (ed.). The Dissector's Manual of Practical and Surgical Anatomy (3rd American from Last Revised London ed.). Philadelphia: Blanchard & Lea. Full text at Internet Archive (archive.org)
- Wilson, Erasmus (1857). On Diseases of the Skin (4th American, from the 4th & enlarged London ed.). Philadelphia: Blanchard & Lea. Full text at Internet Archive (archive.org)
- Wilson, Erasmus (1858). A Three Week Scamper through the Spas of Germany and Belgium; with an Appendix on the Nature and Uses of Mineral Waters. London: John Churchill. Full text at Internet Archive (archive.org)
- Wilson, Erasmus (1859). William H. Gobgrecht (ed.). A System of Human Anatomy, General and Special (New & Improved American, from an Enlarged London ed.). Philadelphia: Blanchard & Lea. Full text at Internet Archive (archive.org)
- Wilson, Erasmus (1860). Thermo-Therapeia: The Heat Cure: or, The Treatment of Disease by Immersion of the Body in Heated Air. London: Printed by T. Richards. (Reprinted from the British Medical Journal). Full text at Internet Archive (archive.org)
- Wilson, Erasmus (1861). The Eastern or Turkish Bath; Its History, Rebirth in Britain, and Application to the Purposes of Health. London: John Churchill. (Reprinted from the British Medical Journal). Full text at Internet Archive (archive.org)
- Wilson, Erasmus (1865). The Student's Book of Cutaneous Medicine and Diseases of the Skin. London: John Churchill and Sons. Full text at Internet Archive (archive.org)
- Wilson, Erasmus (1868). On Diseases of the Skin; A System of Cutaneous Medicine (7th American, from 6th & revised English ed.). Philadelphia: Henry C. Lea. Full text at Internet Archive (archive.org)
- Wilson, Erasmus (1870). Lectures on Ekzema and Ekzematous Affections. With an Introduction on the General Pathology of the Skin. London: John Churchill & Sons.. Full text at Internet Archive (archive.org)
- Wilson, Erasmus (1870). Descriptive Catalogue of the Dermatological Specimens contained in the Museum of the Royal College of Surgeons of England. London: Printed by Taylor & Francis.. Full text at Internet Archive (archive.org)
- Wilson, Erasmus (1875). Lectures on Dermatology; delivered in The Royal College of Surgeons of England in 1874–1875. London: J. & A. Churchill.. Full text at Internet Archive (archive.org)
- Wilson, Erasmus (1876). Healthy Skin: A Popular Teatise on the Skin and Hair, their Preservation and Management (8th ed.). London: J. & A. Churchill.. Full text at Internet Archive (archive.org)
- Wilson, Erasmus (1878). Cleopatra's Needle: with brief notes on Egypt and Egyptian Obelisks. London: Brain & Co.. Full text at Internet Archive (archive.org)
- Wilson, Sir Erasmus (1881). The Egypt of the Past. London: Kegan Paul, Trench & Co. Full text at Internet Archive (archive.org)
- Wilson, Sir Erasmus (1883). The Recent Archaic Discovery of Ancient Egyptian Mummies at Thebes. A lecture delivered to...The Young Men's Christian Association at Margate, February 15th 1883. London: Kegan Paul, Trench & Co. Full text at Internet Archive (archive.org)

Note: Internet Archives lists more copies of some of these titles. Not all were checked. Some may be duplicates, and some may be later editions. The sample above shows that some titles had multiple subsequent editions. Also for books prior to 1881, Wilson did not have the title Sir, as he had not yet been knighted.

== See also ==
- Death of Frederick John White
