= Beavers Lane Camp =

- Hounslow

Site information
- Type: Barracks
- Owner: Ministry of Defence
- Operator: British Army

Location
- Location within London
- Coordinates: 51°28′03″N 00°23′51″W

Site history
- Built: Pre-War
- Built for: War Office
- In use: Pre-War to 1983

Beavers Lane Camp, Hounslow, London is a former camp of the British Army; it was originally built as an extension to the Cavalry Barracks, Hounslow and was also known as I.T. (Infantry Training) Centre, Hounslow.

== History ==
The camp was built on 27 acres (11 ha) of farmland belonging to Millers Farm. The site was acquired in 1939; on 2 January 1940 construction began on hutted accommodation for 7 field officers, 28 junior officers, 35 WOs and Sergeants, and 1,056 other ranks. This included provision for around 150 women of the ATS. The building work was undertaken by G. E. Wallis & Sons. In addition to accommodation, the site included regimental offices and stores, training rooms, workshops, a Regimental Institute, Officers' Mess, Church Room, Gymnasium and all sorts of ancillary facilities. Several of the former farm buildings were adapted for use as Motor Transport sheds.

During the Second World War, the camp was initially occupied by the 2nd Battalion the Welsh Guards (from 1939), which functioned as a 'holding battalion' (for newly trained recruits awaiting deployment) until 1941, whereupon the 3rd Battalion was established at Beavers Lane to take its place. In the spring of 1942, the camp became home to the 70th Battalion the Middlesex Regiment, who had been stationed in the Cavalry Barracks, Hounslow (a few hundred yards up on the other side of Beaver Lane); they remained there until August 1943. After the war it became an Infantry Training Centre with accommodation for circa 1,500 staff. The sheds and workshops were later occupied by 70 MT Company, the Royal Army Service Corps. In the 1950s the Army built new married soldiers' accommodation for the camp (Beavers Terrace and Cavalry Terrace).

Beavers Lane Camp was the home of 10 Signals Regiment from 1964 until 1983 (when it moved to HQ UK Land Forces at Wilton). The 'White Helmets' (Royal Signals Motorcycle Display Team) was also based at Beavers Lane for this period. Following the Royal Signals' departure, their buildings were taken over for a time by the Special Investigations Branch of the Military Police. In addition, the site included extensive workshops and offices for the Royal Corps of Transport and the Royal Electrical and Mechanical Engineers; the RCT (successors to the RASC) left Beavers Lane for Regent's Park Barracks in 1989–90. That same year saw the departure of the Royal Army Ordnance Corps, who had a bomb disposal unit based at Beavers Lane through the 1970s and '80s; it relocated to RAF Northolt.

During the 1990s the camp remained in MOD ownership, but earmarked for disposal. Over half the original buildings had already been demolished, in the late 1960s and early '70s. A third of the site was cleared and put up for sale in 1994 (British Airways acquired it and built industrial units). The remaining 18 acres (7.3 ha) remained in a derelict state until the year 2000, when the remaining buildings were finally demolished, the ground decontaminated and the site subsequently sold. It is now an industrial estate.
