= George Ballingall =

Scottish physician and surgeon

Sir George Ballingall
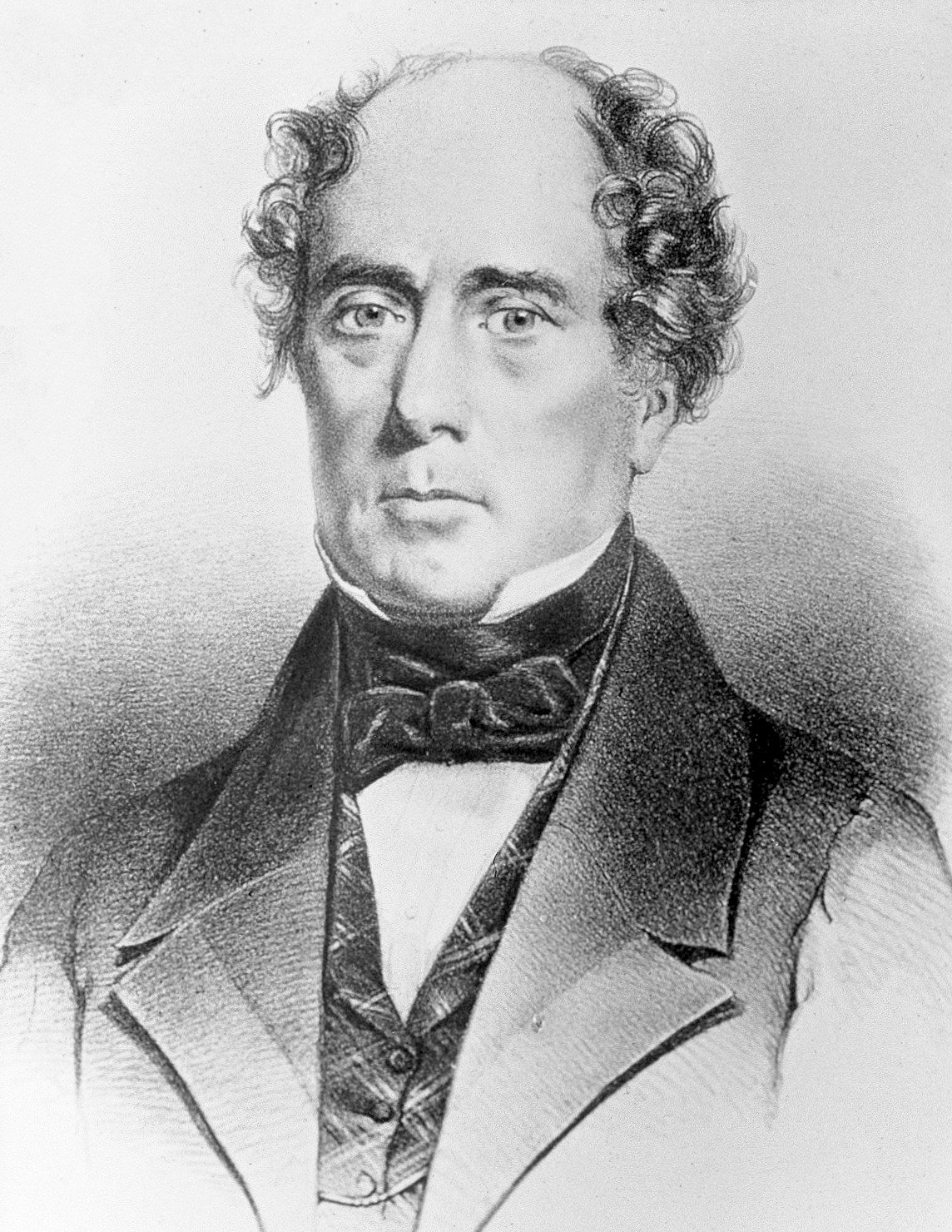
- Born: 2 May 1780; Forglen, by Bogton, Banffshire, Scotland
- Died: 4 December 1855 (aged 75); Blairgowrie, Perthshire, Scotland
- Citizenship: Great Britain
- Education: University of St Andrews; University of Edinburgh
- Occupations: Physician; Surgeon
- Employer(s): Army Surgeon (1806); Army Surgeon in India (1815–1818); Surgeon, 33rd Foot (1818–1823); Practicing Physician and Surgeon, Edinburgh; Lecturer in Military Surgery, Edinburgh University (1823); Professor of Military Surgery, Edinburgh University (1823–1855)

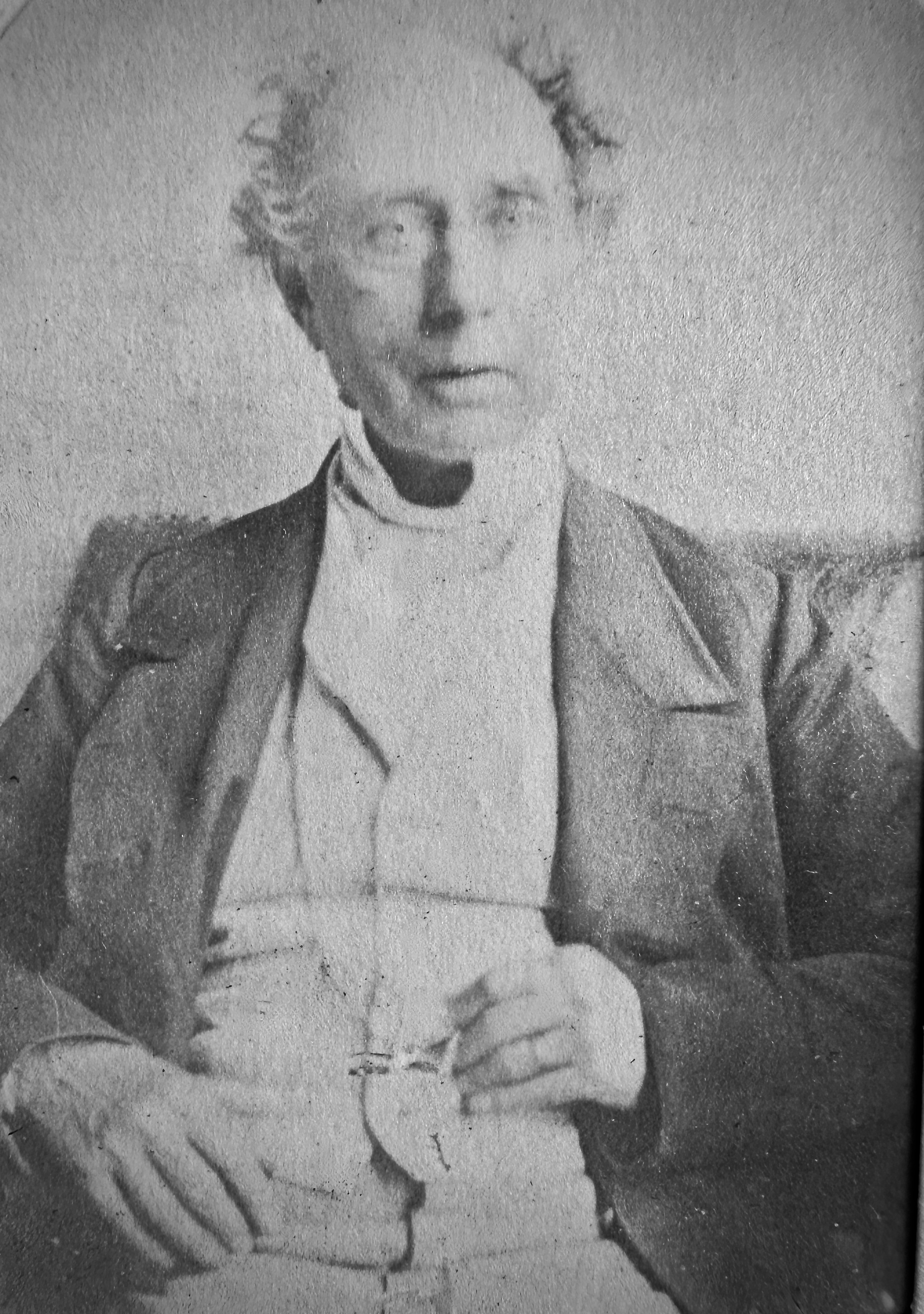
Ballingall in later life

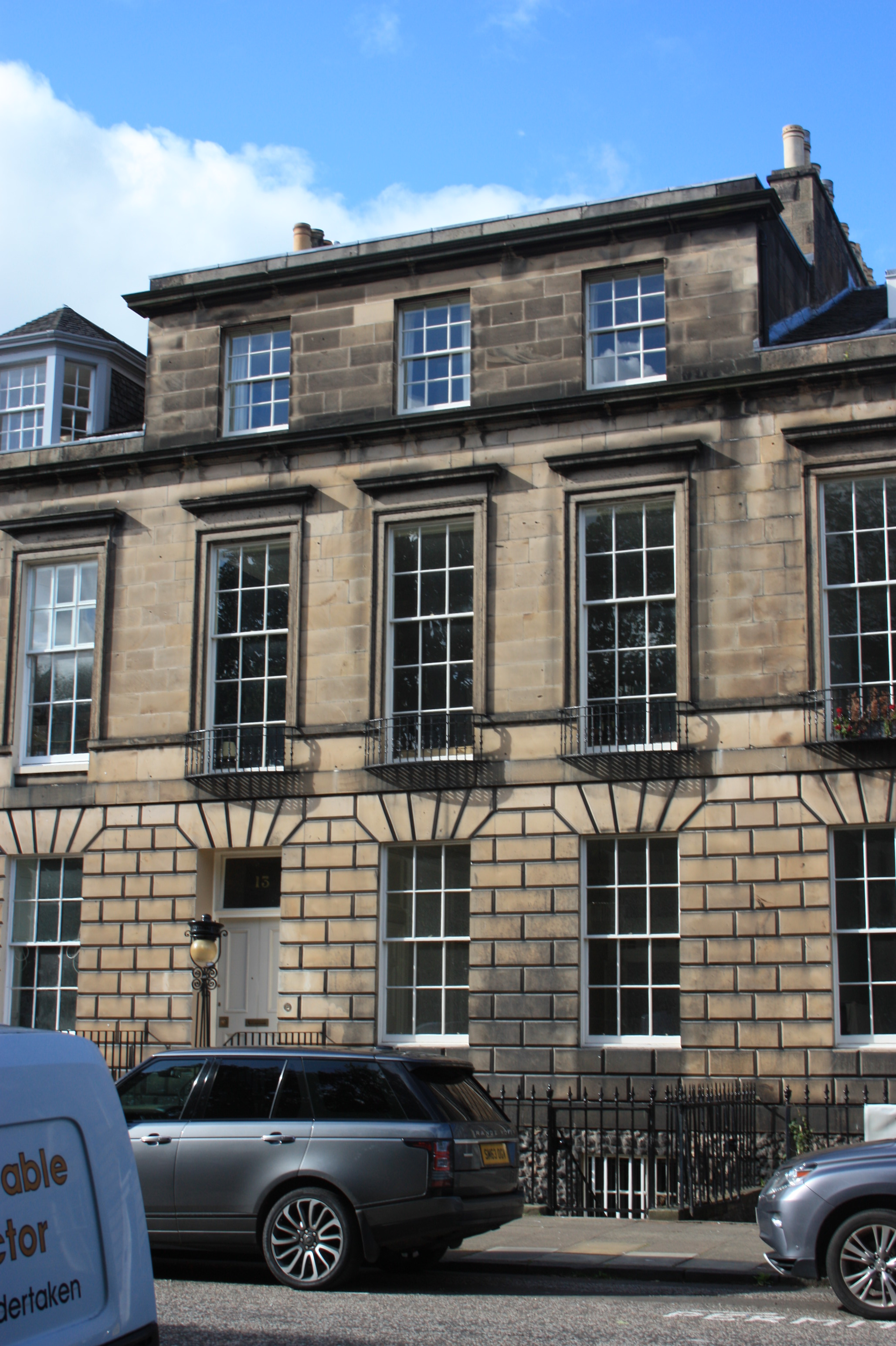
13 Heriot Row, Edinburgh

Sir George Ballingall FRSE FRCPE FRCSE FSAScot (2 May 1780 – 4 December 1855) was a Scottish medical doctor and surgeon. He was regius professor of military surgery at the University of Edinburgh.

== Life ==
Ballingall was son of the Reverend Robert Ballingall, minister of Forglen, Banffshire, where he was born. He studied at the University of St Andrews, going on to the University of Edinburgh where he passed his MD in 1803. While at the university, he was an assistant to John Barclay, lecturer on anatomy.

He was appointed assistant-surgeon of the 2nd battalion 1st Royals in 1806, with which he served some years in India; in November 1815 he became surgeon of the 33rd foot, and retired on half-pay in 1818.

In 1823 he was chosen, in preference to David Maclagan, as lecturer on Military Surgery at the University of Edinburgh, which then, and for some years afterwards, was the only place in the United Kingdom where special instruction was given in a department of surgical science, the importance of which had too plainly been demonstrated during the long war just ended. In 1821 he was elected to the Aesculapian Club. In 1821 Ballingall was also elected a member of the Harveian Society of Edinburgh and served as president in 1824 and 1830.

In 1825 Ballingall succeeded to the Chair of military surgery, the duties of which he discharged with untiring zeal for 30 years until his death.

He was knighted in 1830 on the occasion of the accession of King William IV.

In 1832-3 his address is recorded as 13 Heriot Row in Edinburgh.

In 1836 he was elected President of the Royal College of Surgeons in Edinburgh.

In 1840 he was living at 13 Heriot Row in Edinburgh's Second New Town.

He died at his estate at Blairgowrie on 4 December 1855.

== Publications ==
Ballingall, who was a fellow of the Royal Society of Edinburgh and corresponding member of the French Institute, was author of various professional works, the most important being:

- Observations on the Diseases of European Troops in India
- Observations on the Site and Construction of Hospitals
- Outlines of Military Surgery

The last, which is still regarded as an instructive work, went through five editions, the fifth appearing at the time of the Russian war, shortly before the Ballingall's death.
