= Whitehill Wood, Aberdeenshire =

Megalithic monument in Scotland

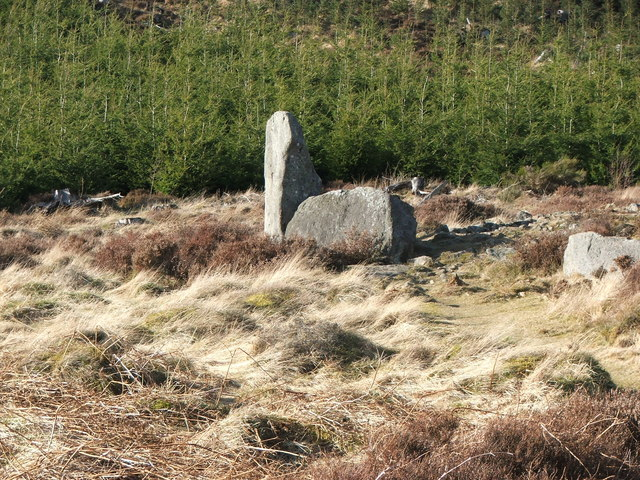
- Stone circle in 2009
- Interactive map of Whitehill Wood, Aberdeenshire
- 57°32′37″N 2°32′22″W
- Location: Aberdeenshire, Scotland

History
- Built: c. 1200BC (Lockyer) c. 2500BC (HES)

Scheduled monument
- Official name: Whitehill, stone circle, Bogmore Wood
- Type: Prehistoric ritual and funerary: stone circle or ring
- Designated: 17 August 1925
- Reference no.: SM55

Whitehill Wood is a wood and megalithic stone circle in Aberdeenshire, Scotland, located off the B9025 road between Aberchirder and Turriff and between the hamlets of Bogton and Laithers. It is one of the Aberdeenshire circles, which according to Sir Norman Lockyer were built around 1200 BC. However, Historic Environment Scotland describes it as 4500 years old. It is protected as a scheduled monument.
