= Bogton =

Coordinates: 57.54°N 02.55°W

- Location within Aberdeenshire
- OS grid reference: NJ6751
- Council area: Aberdeenshire
- Lieutenancy area: Banffshire
- Country: Scotland
- Sovereign state: United Kingdom
- Police: Scotland
- Fire: Scottish
- Ambulance: Scottish
- UK Parliament: Aberdeenshire North and Moray East
- Scottish Parliament: Banffshire and Buchan Coast

Bogton is a rural area in Aberdeenshire, Scotland. To the south is Whitehill Wood and megalithic circle.

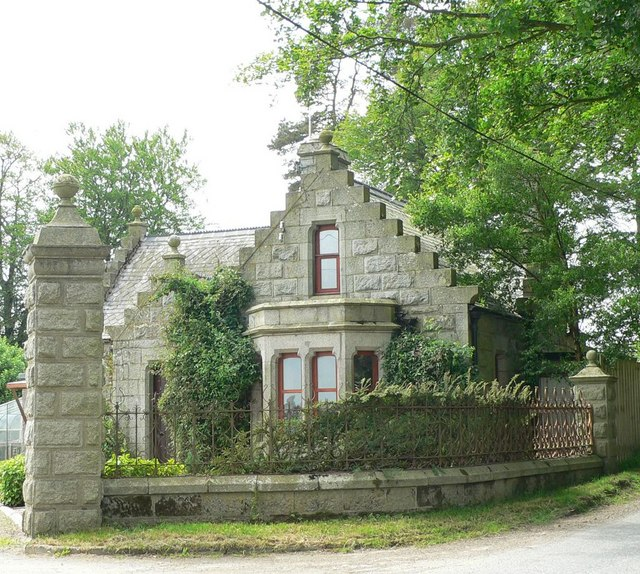
The former lodge of Carnousie Castle, near Bogton
