= White Hill, Monmouth =

Hill in Wales

White Hill
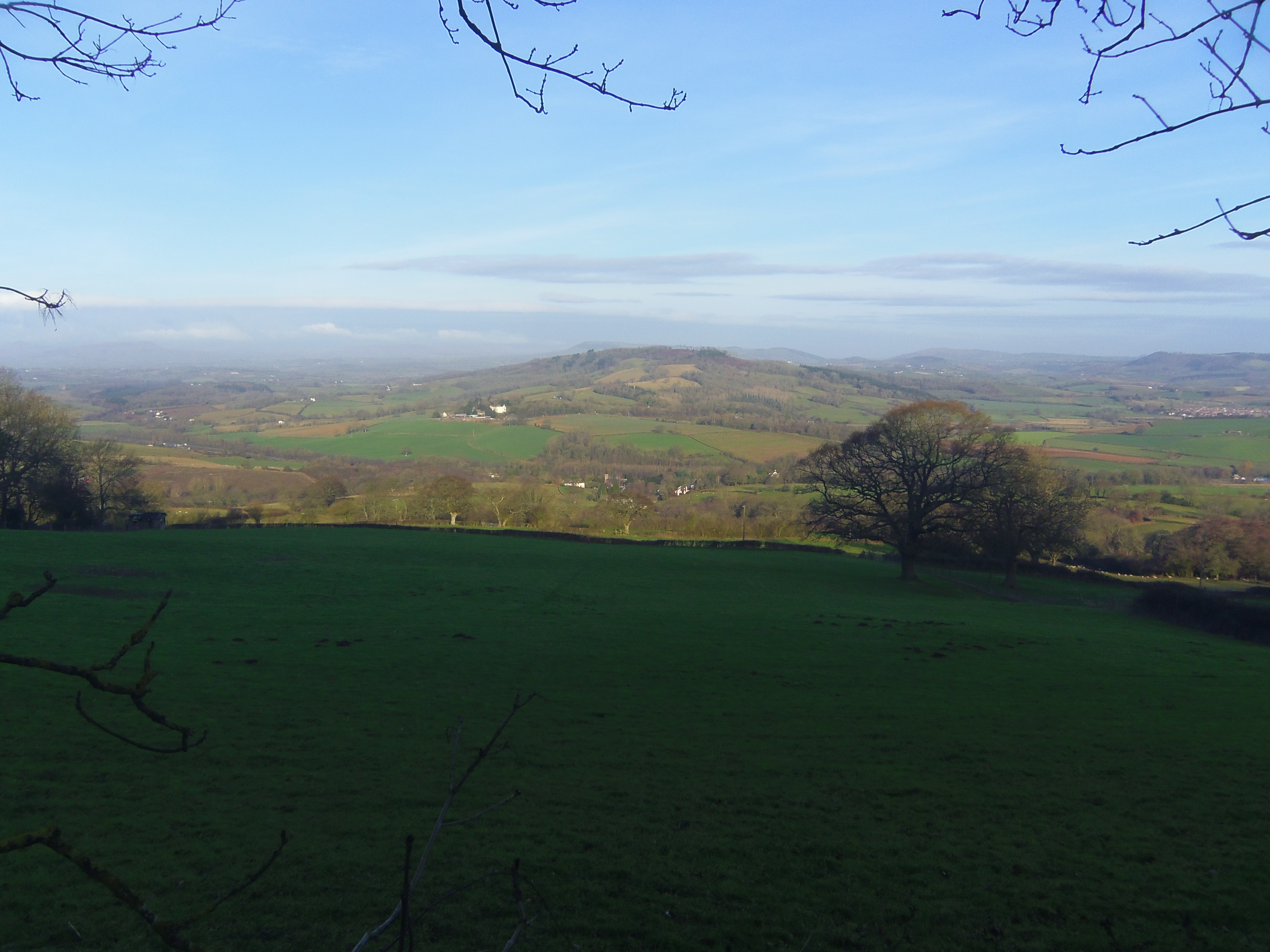

Highest point
- Coordinates: 51°48′39″N 2°45′34″W

Geography
- Location: Monmouth, Monmouthshire, Wales
- OS grid: SO 4804 1222

White Hill is a hill rising to over 205 metres (673 ft) to the west of the town of Monmouth, South Wales and north of Wonastow. Much of it is covered by woodland.

== Geology ==
The hill is formed from mudstones and sandstones of the St Maughans formation, a unit of the lower Old Red Sandstone which also contains bands of conglomerates. Lower ground is formed by the mudstones of the Raglan Mudstone Formation, the boundary between this and the St Maughans beingmarked by the Bishops Frome Limestone (also known formerly as the Psammosteus Limestone and now known more formally as the Chapel Point Limestone Member), a calcrete, effectively a fossil soil. All of these rocks are of Devonian age.

== History ==
At the start of the 20th century, White Hill had an abundance of blackthorn and cherry trees. In the spring the hedgerows and trees would blossom so the hill would be covered in a mass of white - hence White Hill. During the 20th century the Forestry Commission took over management of the woods and gradually blossoming trees and hedgerows have been replaced with faster growing evergreen trees.

== Wildlife ==
The hill is home to a herd of approximately 40 fallow deer, as well as badgers, foxes and a host of smaller mammals that provide ample prey for the buzzards and kestrels. In the summer adders and grass snakes can be seen among the wood piles.

== Access ==
Several public bridleways lead to and across the hill, from Worthybrook and Wonastow to the south and from Monmouth to the east. There are in addition a number of public footpaths and a restricted byway giving access to the hill. In addition there are other forest access tracks within the woodland, the larger part of which is owned and managed by Natural Resources Wales (successor body to Forestry Commission Wales) and dedicated as 'open country' under the provisions of the Countryside and Rights of Way Act 2000 meaning that the public have a right of access on foot across the area. The Offa's Dyke Path runs east–west across the northern flanks of White Hill.

== Views of White Hill ==
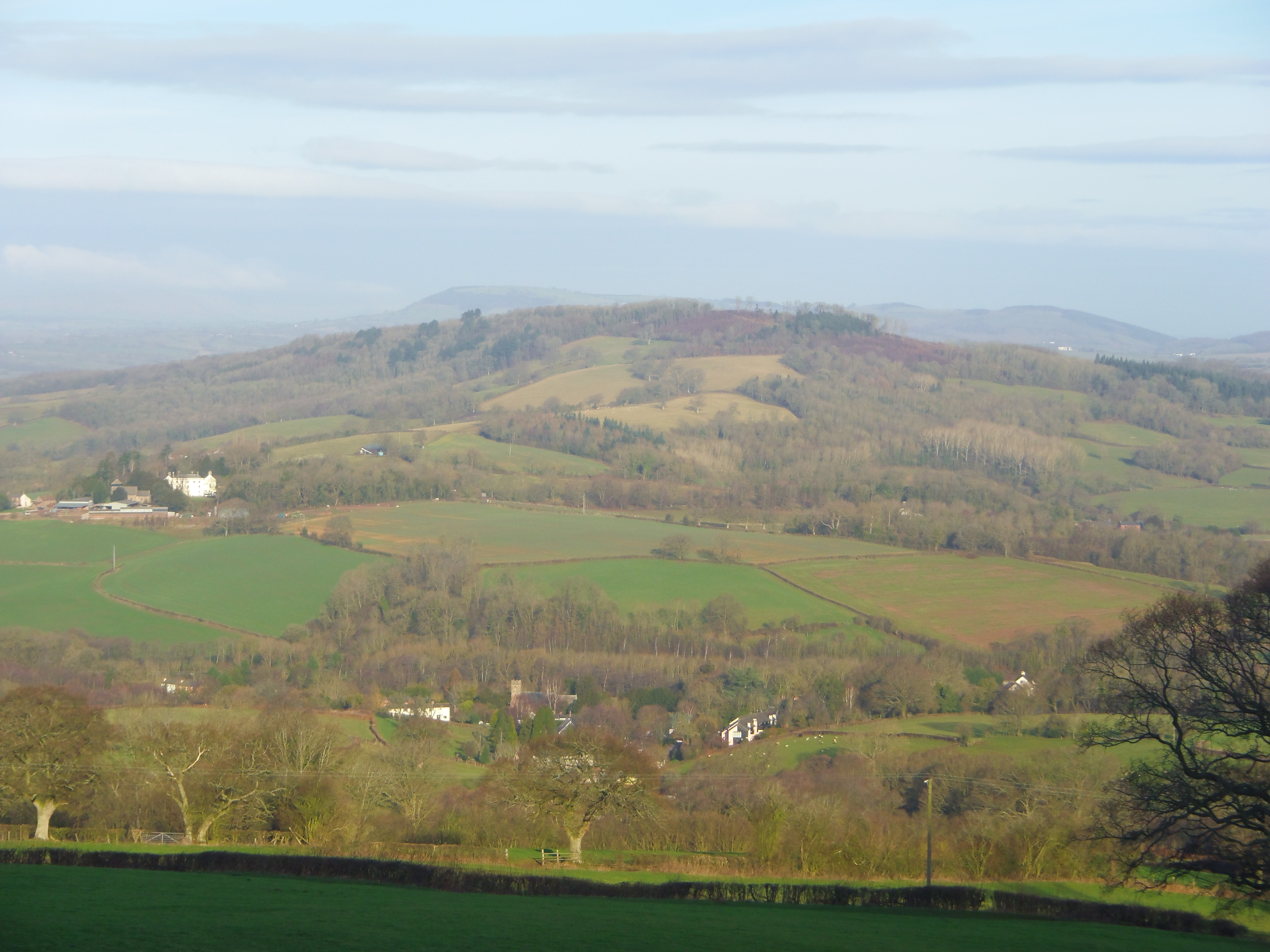
White Hill from the B4233

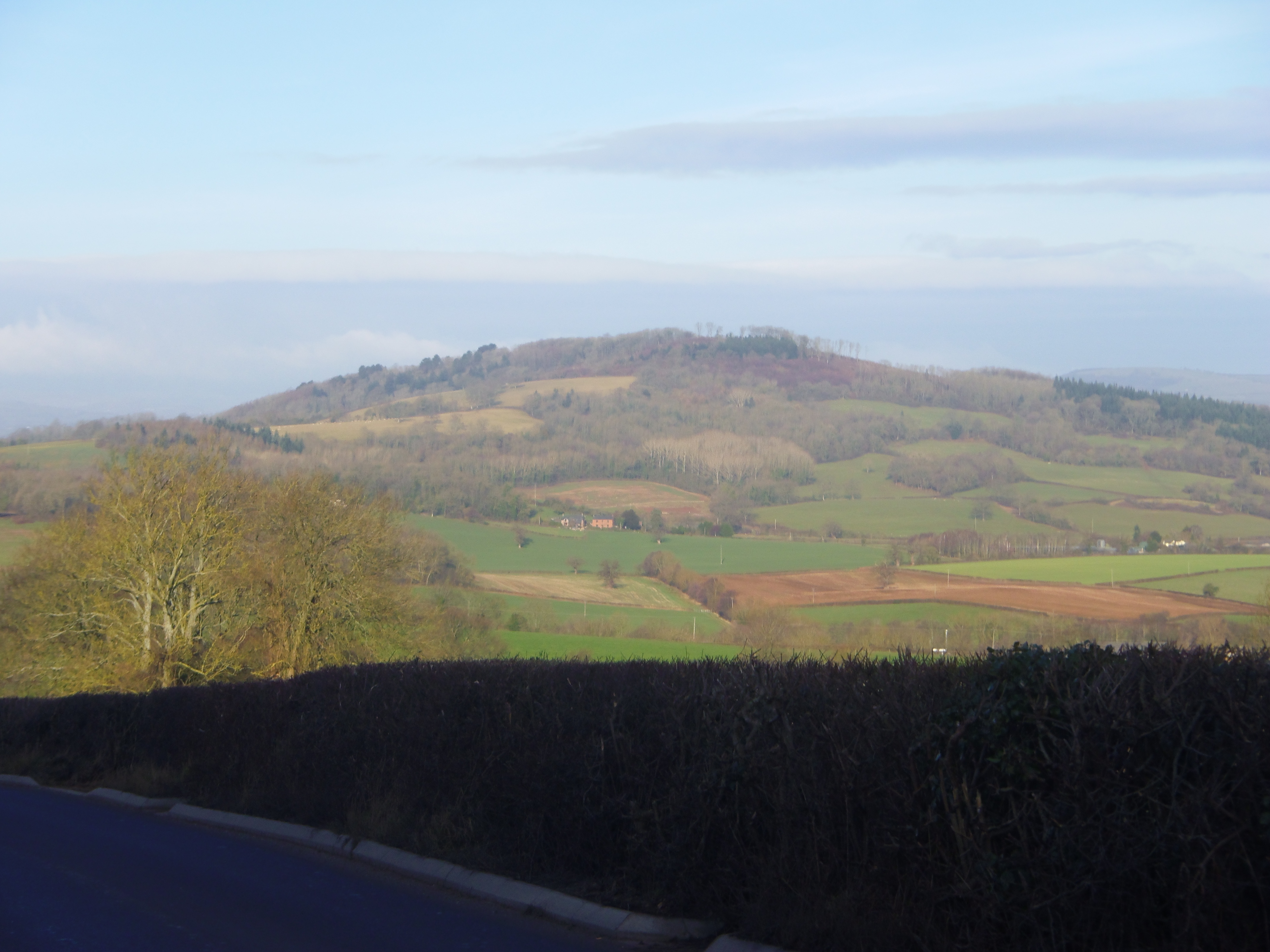
White Hill from Old Monmouth Road

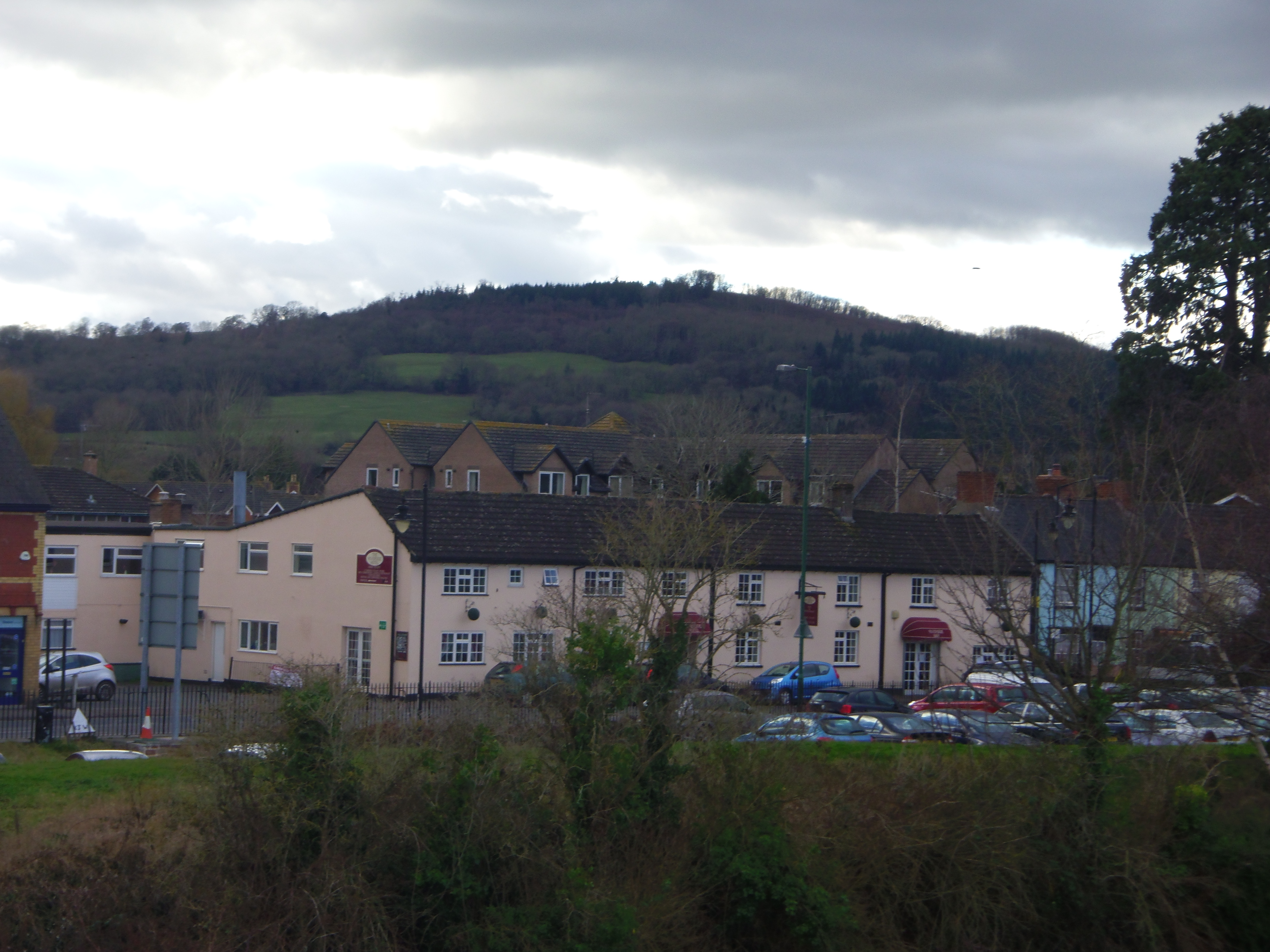
White Hill from the New Monnow Bridge

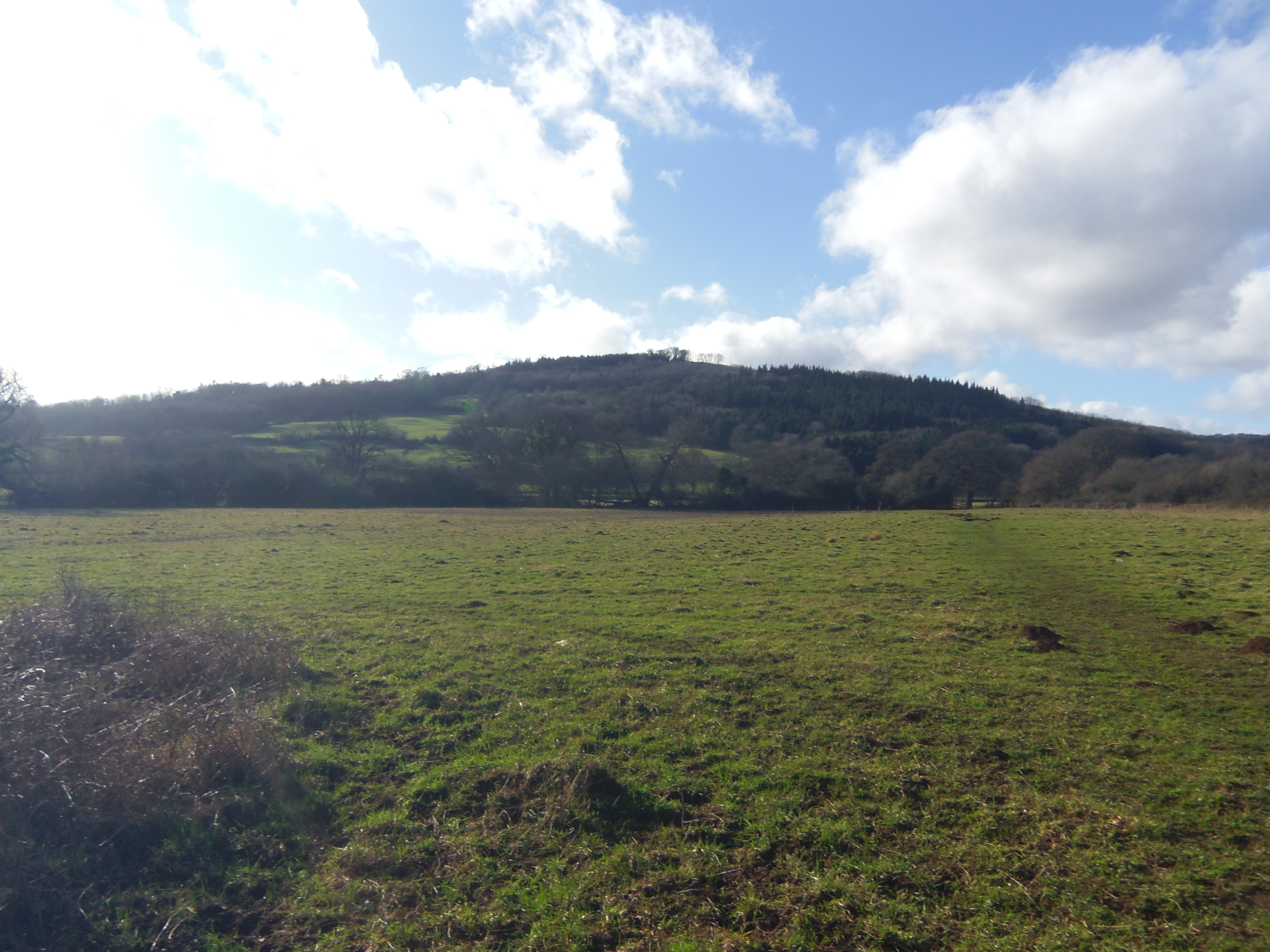
The foot of White Hill
