= Cleopatra's Needles =

Ancient Egyptian obelisks in New York City and London

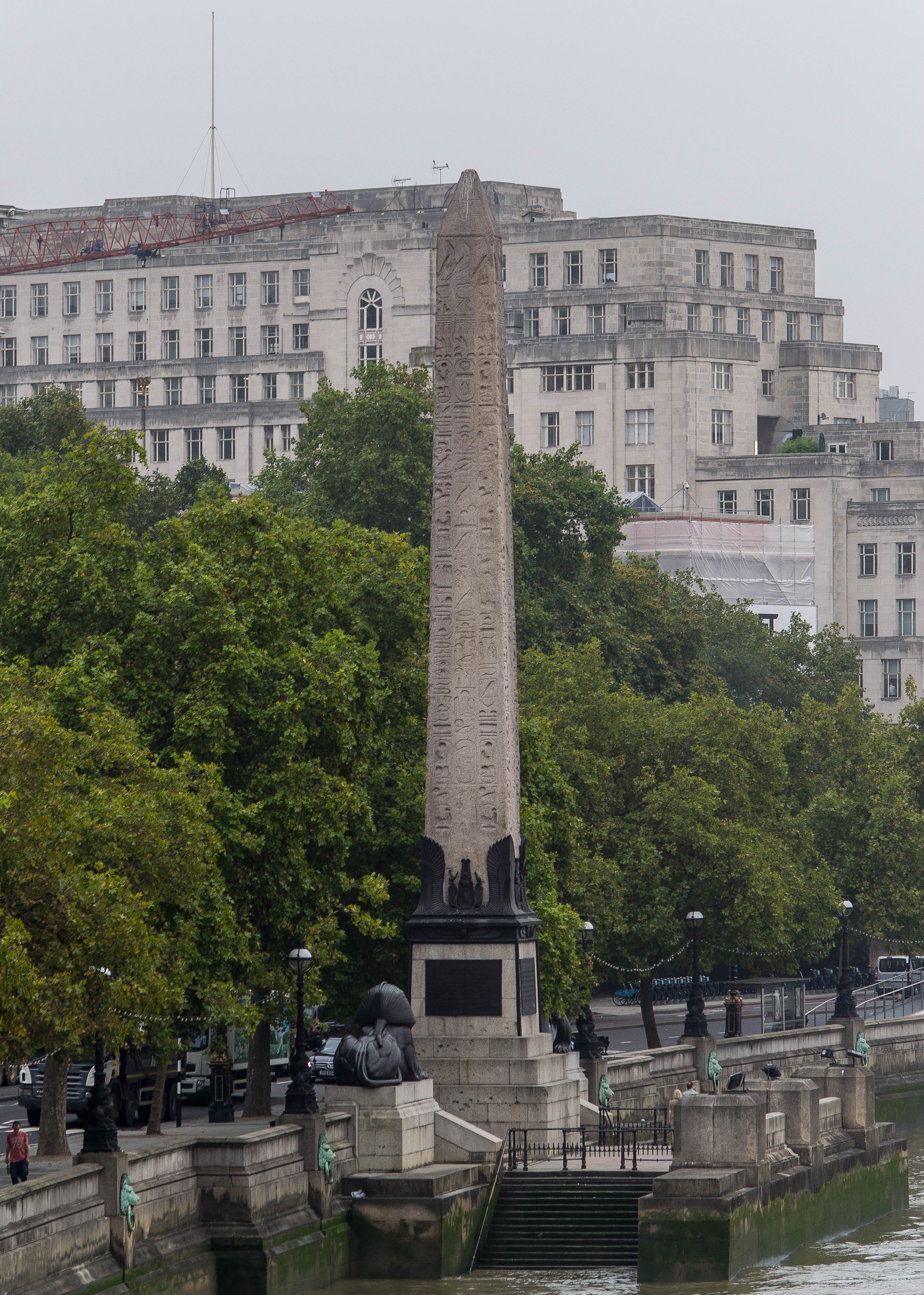
London's Victoria Embankment

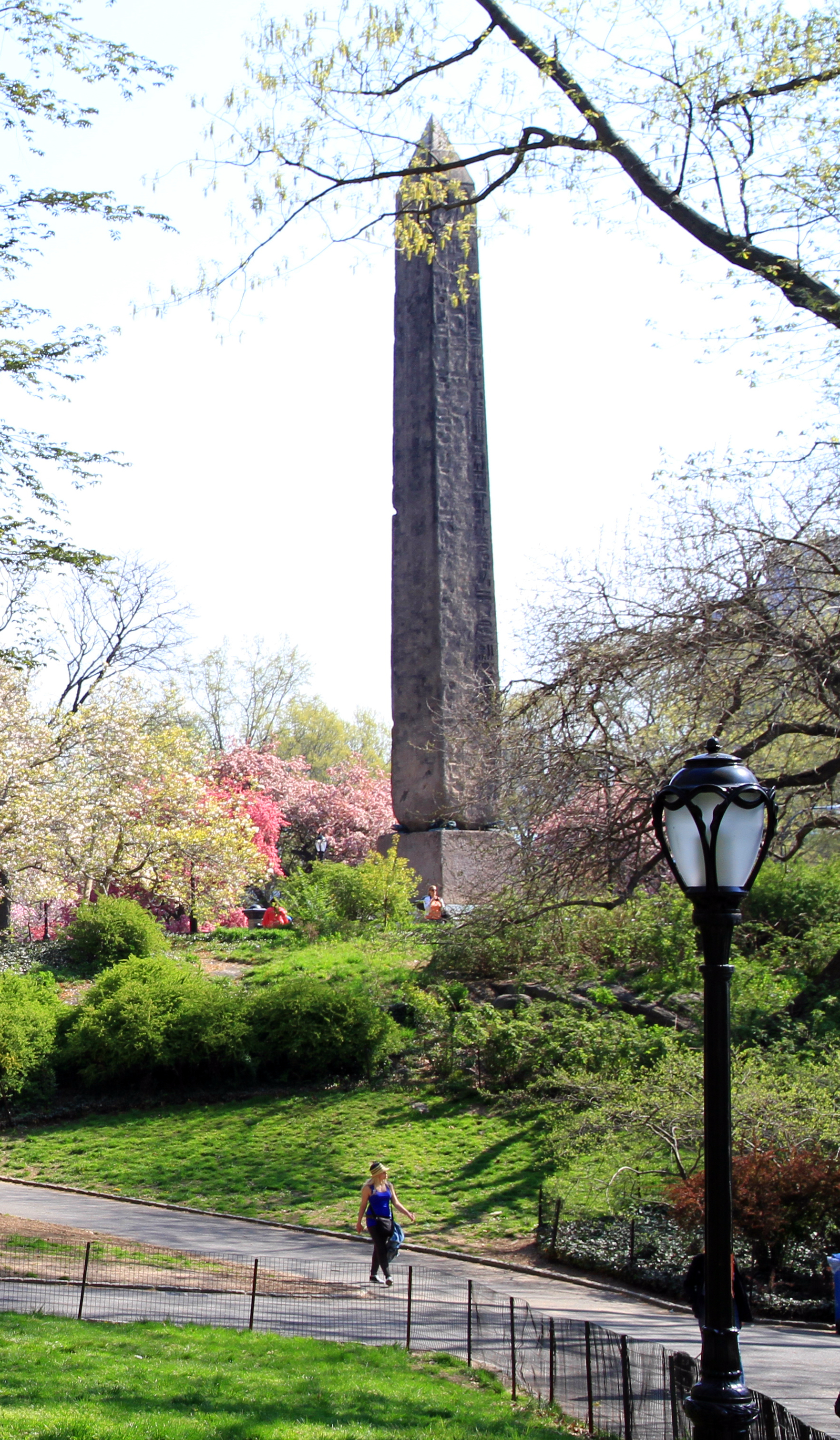
New York's Central Park, just outside the Metropolitan Museum of Art

Cleopatra's Needles are a separated pair of ancient Egyptian obelisks now in London and New York City. The obelisks were originally made in Heliopolis (modern Cairo) during the New Kingdom period, inscribed by the 18th dynasty pharaoh Thutmose III and 19th dynasty pharaoh Ramesses II. In 13/12 BCE they were moved to the Caesareum of Alexandria by the prefect of Egypt Publius Rubrius Barbarus. Since at least the 17th century the obelisks have usually been named in the West after the Ptolemaic Queen Cleopatra VII. They stood in Alexandria for almost two millennia until they were re-erected in London and New York City in 1878 and 1881 respectively. Together with Pompey's Pillar, they were described in the 1840s in David Roberts' Egypt and Nubia as "[the] most striking monuments of ancient Alexandria."

The removal of the obelisks from Egypt was presided over by Isma'il Pasha, who had greatly indebted the Khedivate of Egypt during its rapid modernization. The London needle was presented to the United Kingdom in 1819, but remained in Alexandria until 1877 when Sir William James Erasmus Wilson, a distinguished anatomist and dermatologist, sponsored its transportation to London.

In the same year, Elbert E. Farman, the then-United States Consul General at Cairo, secured the other needle for the United States. The needle was transported by Henry Honychurch Gorringe. Both Wilson and Gorringe published books commemorating the transportation of the Needles: Wilson wrote Cleopatra's Needle: With Brief Notes on Egypt and Egyptian Obelisks (1877) and Gorringe wrote Egyptian Obelisks (1885).

The London needle was placed on the Victoria Embankment, which had been built a few years earlier in 1870, whilst the New York needle was placed in Central Park just outside the Metropolitan Museum of Art's main building, also built just a few years earlier in 1872.

Damage to the obelisks by weather conditions in London and New York has been studied, notably by Professor Erhard M. Winkler of the University of Notre Dame. Zahi Hawass, a former Egyptian Minister of Antiquities, has called for their restoration or repatriation.

== Alexandria ==
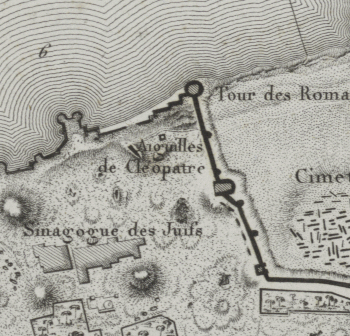
Aiguilles de Cleopatra (Cleopatra's Needles) in Alexandria, from the 1809 Description de l'Égypte.

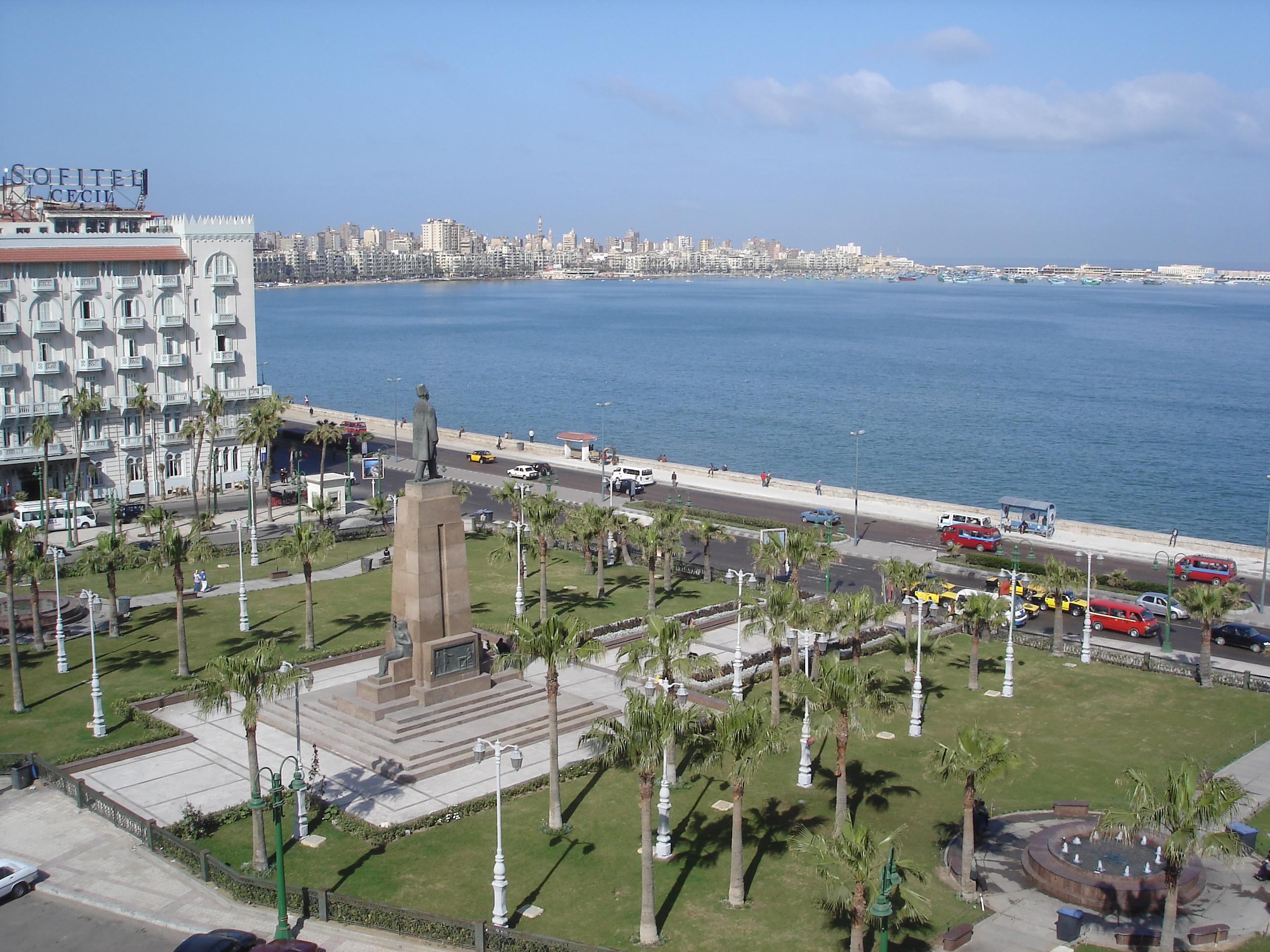
Modern photograph of the Alexandria location of the needles, now containing a statue of Saad Zaghloul

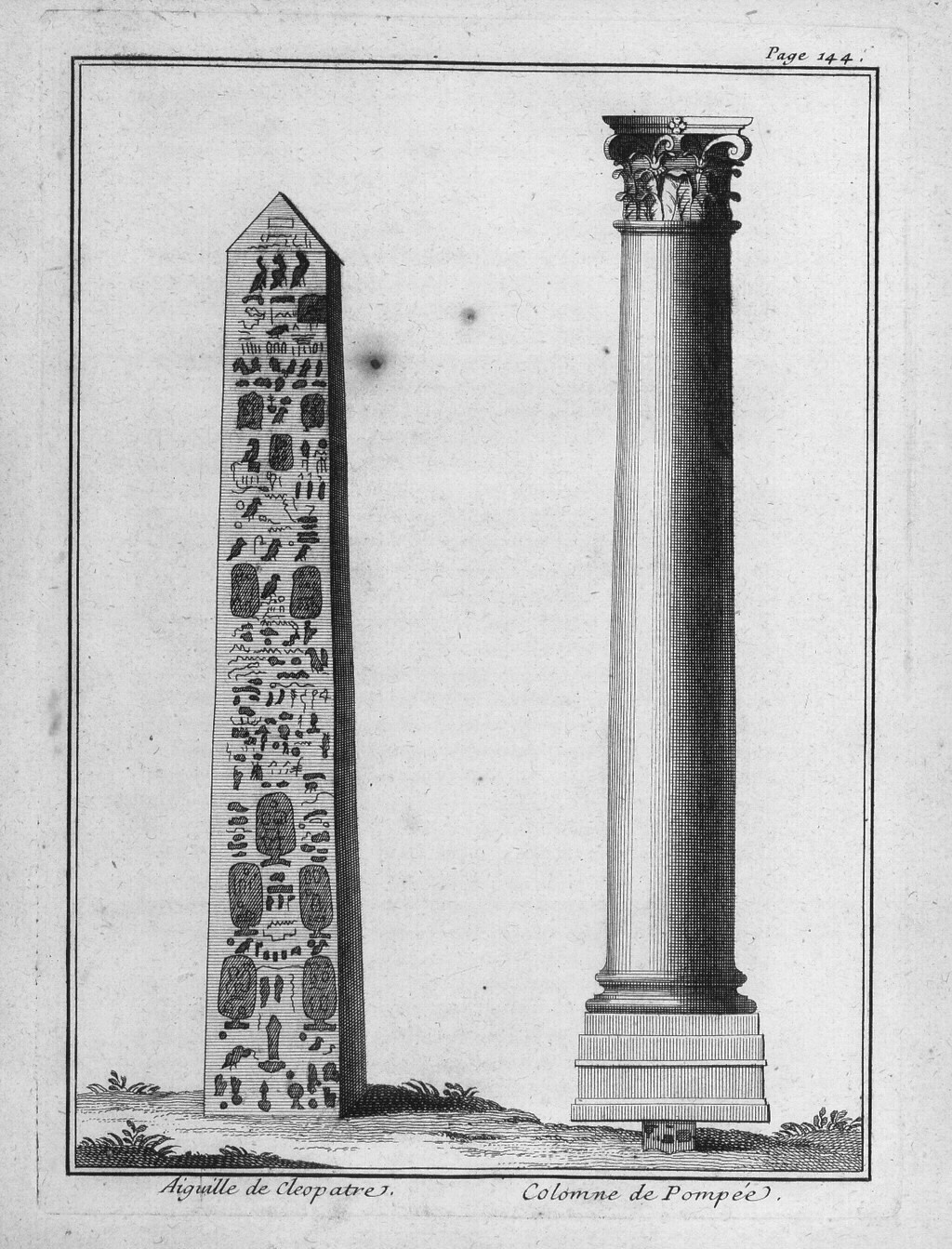
Benoît de Maillet's 1735 Description de l'Egypte, showing Aiguille de Cléopâtre and Pompey's Pillar

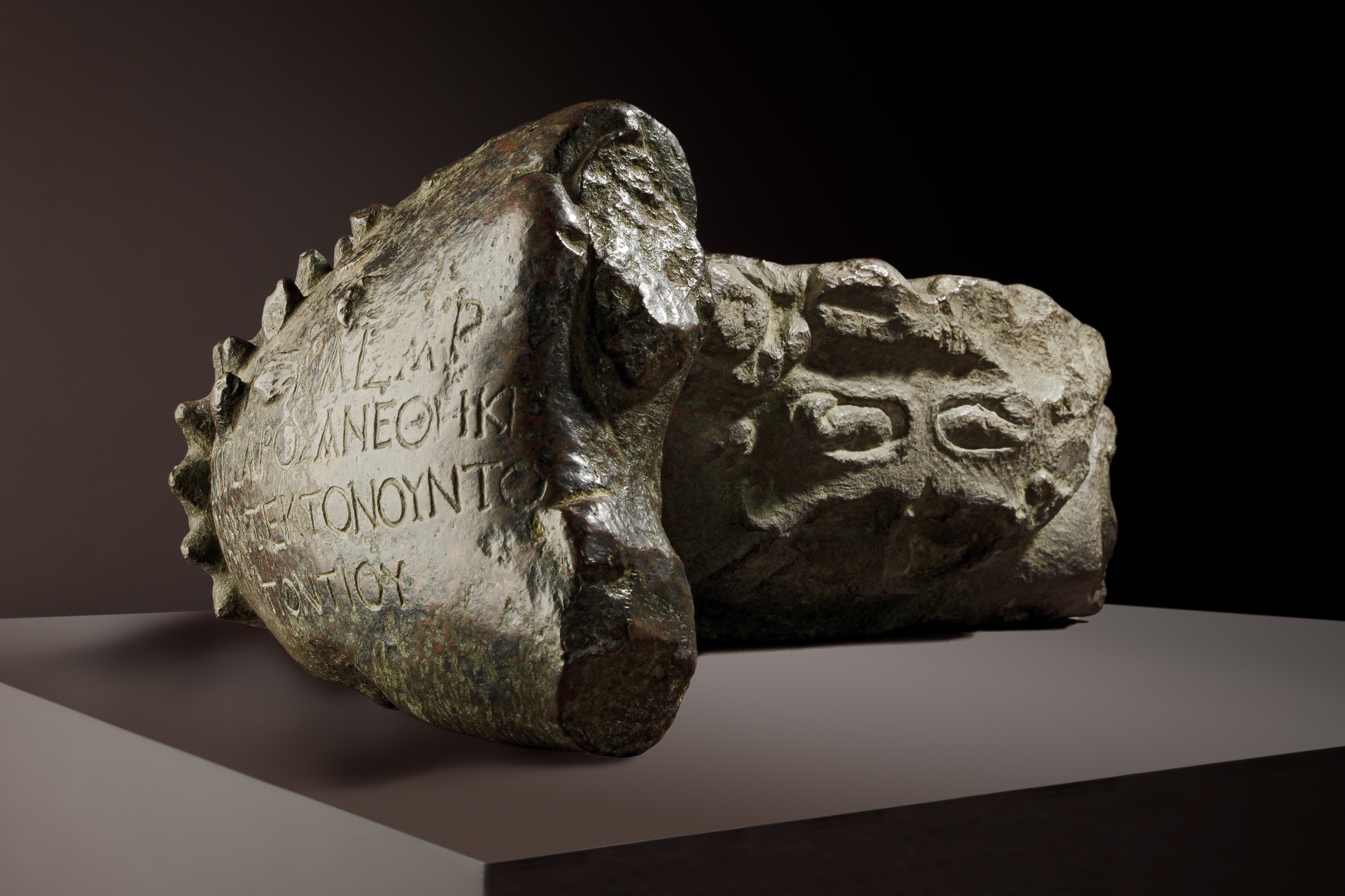
Decorative Roman crab, now at the Metropolitan Museum of Art, with a bilingual inscription: Greek: L IΗ ΚΑΙΣΑΡΟΣ ΒΑΡΒΑΡΟΣ ΑΝΕΘΗΚΕ ΑΡΧΙΤΕΚΤΟΝΟΥΝΤΟΣ ΠΟΝΤΙΟΥ and Latin: ANNO XVIII CAESARIS BARBARVS PRAEF AEGYPTI POSVIT ARCHITECTANTE PONTIO, which translates as: "In the eighteenth year Of Augustus Cæsar, Barbarus, prefect Of Egypt, caused this obelisk to be placed here, Pontius being the architect"

The name Cleopatra's Needles derives from the French name, "Les aiguilles de Cléopâtre" ("aiguille" meaning "needle"), when they stood in Alexandria.

The earliest known post-classical reference to the obelisks was by the Cairo-based traveller Abd al-Latif al-Baghdadi in c.1200 CE, who according to E. A. Wallis Budge described them as "Cleopatra's big needles". (Note: The reference to Cleopatra claimed by Budge does not appear in available versions of Abd al-Latif al-Baghdadi's work. See for example the 1800 bilingual version (both Latin and Arabic) al-Baghdādī, M.D.A.L. (1800). Abdollatiphi Historiæ Ægypti compendium,: Arabice et Latine. p. 111.; Arabic: ورايت بالاسكندرية مسلتين علي سيف البحر في وسط العمارة اكبر من هذه الصغار واصغر من العظيمتين, lit. 'In Alexandria, I saw two obelisks on the sea shore in the middle of the building, larger than these little ones and smaller than the two great ones'; Latin: Vidi in Alexandria duos Obelifcos fuper littore maris, in medio munimenti, majores his quidem parvis, magnis autem illis duobus minores, lit. 'At Alexandria I saw two obelisks near the shore of the sea, in the midst of the ramparts, the greater of the two small ones, and the smaller of the two large ones.' Also a 2021 translation al-Baghdādī, A.L.; Mackintosh-Smith, T. (2021). A Physician on the Nile: A Description of Egypt and Journal of the Famine Years. Library of Arabic Literature. NYU Press. pp. 74–75. ISBN 978-1-4798-0624-9.: Following a section discussing Ain Shams (Heliopolis): "I also saw two obelisks in Alexandria, on the seafront in the middle of the built-up area, bigger than these small ones but smaller than the two enormous ones.") At this point, both obelisks were still standing – it is thought that the toppling of one of the obelisks happened during the 1303 Crete earthquake, which also damaged the nearby Lighthouse of Alexandria.

George Sandys wrote of his 1610 journey: "Of Antiquities there are few remainders: onely an Hieroglyphicall Obelisk of Theban marble, as hard welnigh as Porphir, but of a deeper red, and speckled alike, called Pharos Needle, standing where once stood the pallace of Alexander: and another lying by, and like it, halfe buried in rubbidge." Two decades later, another English traveller Henry Blount wrote "Within on the North towards the Sea are two square obeliskes each of one intire stone, full of Egyptian Hieroglyphicks, the one standing, the other fallen, I thinke either of them thrice as bigge as that at Constantinople, or the other at Rome, & therefore left behind as too heavy for transportation: neere these obeliskes, are the ruines of Cleopatraes Palace high upon the shore, with the private Gate, whereat she received her Marke Antony after their overthrow at Actium".

In 1735, the former French consul in Egypt, Benoît de Maillet, wrote in his Description de l'Egypte:

Cleopatra's Needles: After this famous monument, the oldest and most curious in modern Alexandria are these two Needles, or Obelisks, which are attributed to Cleopatra, without anyone knowing too well on what basis. One is now overturned, and almost buried under the sands; the other still remains upright.

In 1755, Frederic Louis Norden wrote in his Voyage d'Egypte et de Nubie that:

Some ancient authors have written that these two Obelisks were found in their time in the Palace of Cleopatra; but they do not tell us who had placed them there. It is believed that these monuments are much older than the City of Alexandria, and that they were brought from some place in Egypt, to decorate this Palace. This conjecture is well founded, as we know that at the time of the foundation of Alexandria, these monuments covered with hieroglyphs were no longer made, the understanding and use of which had already been lost long before.

Images from 18th and 19th century Alexandria show two needles, one standing and the other fallen. The London needle was the fallen needle.

The location is now the site of a statue of Egyptian statesman Saad Zaghloul.

== London needle ==
The London needle is in the City of Westminster, on the Victoria Embankment near the Golden Jubilee Bridges.

In 1819, Muhammad Ali Pasha gave Britain the fallen obelisk as a gift. However, Britain's prime minister at the time, Lord Liverpool, hesitated on having it brought to the country due to shipping expenses.

Two prior suggestions had been made to transport the needle to London – in 1832 and in the 1850s after the Great Exhibition; however, neither proceeded.

In 1867, James Edward Alexander was inspired on a visit to Paris' Place de la Concorde to arrange for an equivalent monument in London. He stated that he was informed that the owner of the land in Alexandria where the British needle lay had proposed to break it up for building material. Alexander campaigned to arrange for the transportation. In 1876 he went to Egypt and met Isma'il Pasha, the Khedive of Egypt, together with Edward Stanton then the British Consul-General. Alexander's friend, William James Erasmus Wilson, agreed to cover the costs of the transportation, which took place in October 1877.

On 4 September 1917, during World War I, a bomb from a German air raid landed near the needle. In commemoration of this event, the damage remains unrepaired to this day and is clearly visible in the form of shrapnel holes and gouges on the western sphinx. Restoration work was carried out in 2005.

== New York needle ==
In 1869, at the opening of the Suez Canal, Isma'il Pasha suggested to American journalist William Henry Hurlbert the possible transportation of an obelisk from Egypt to the United States.

The New York City needle was erected in Central Park, just west of the Metropolitan Museum of Art, on 22 February 1881. It was secured in May 1877 by judge Elbert E. Farman, the then-United States Consul General at Cairo, as a gift from the Khedive for the United States remaining a friendly neutral as the European powers – France and Britain – maneuvered to secure political control of the Egyptian Government.

== Galleries ==
=== In Alexandria ===
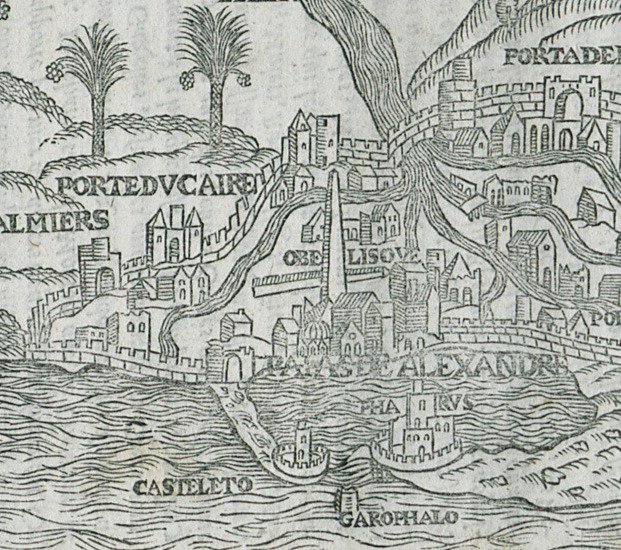
1554 map of Alexandria showing both Cleopatra's Needles (standing and fallen) in Belon's Observations

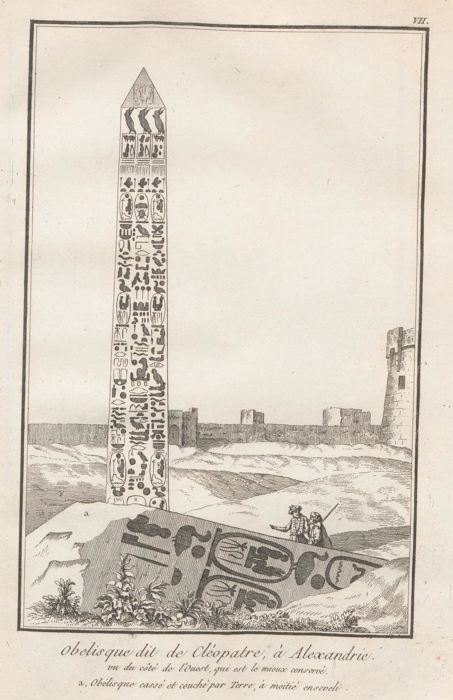
1737 sketch from Frederic Louis Norden's Voyage d'Egypte et de Nubie

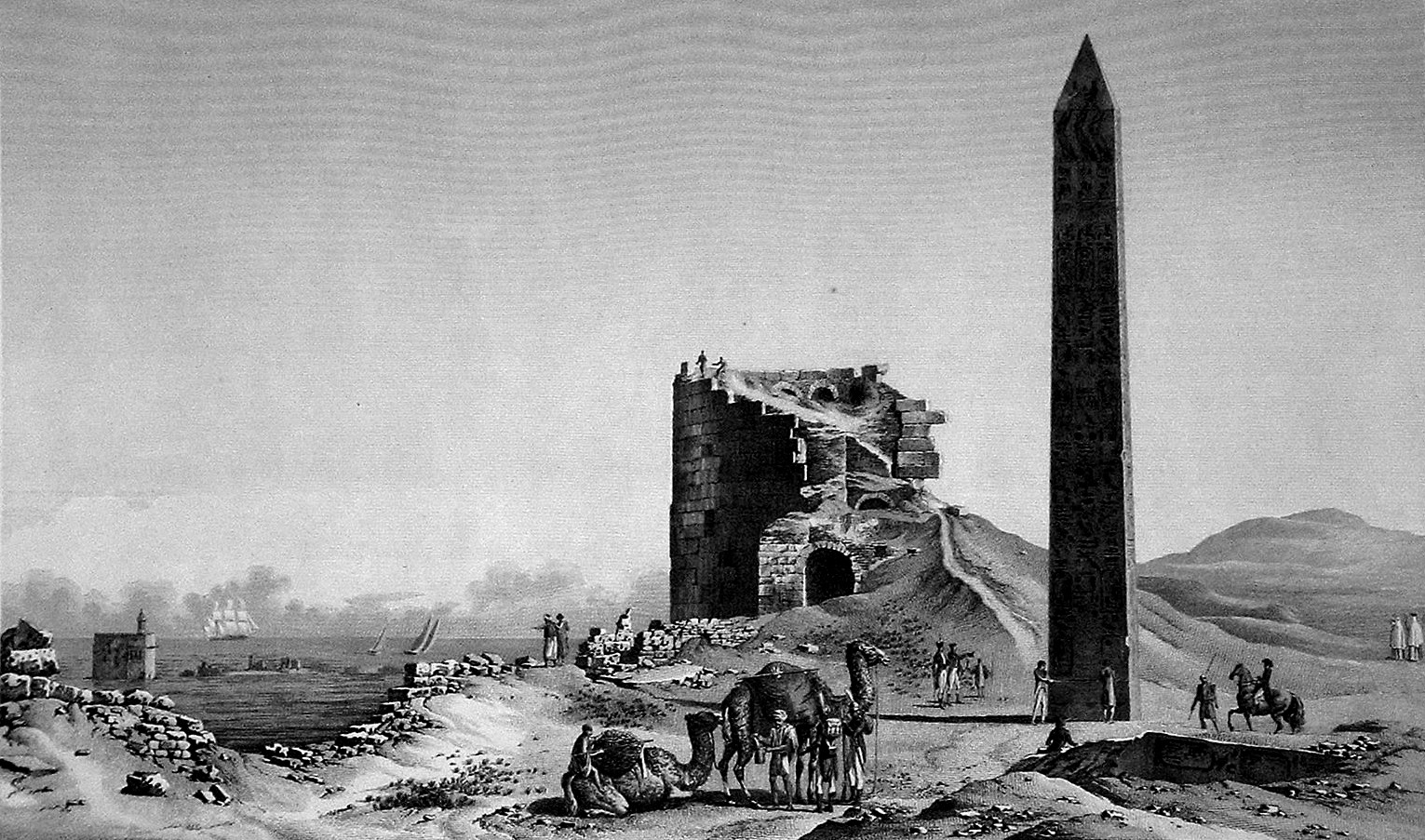
1798 (both needles visible)

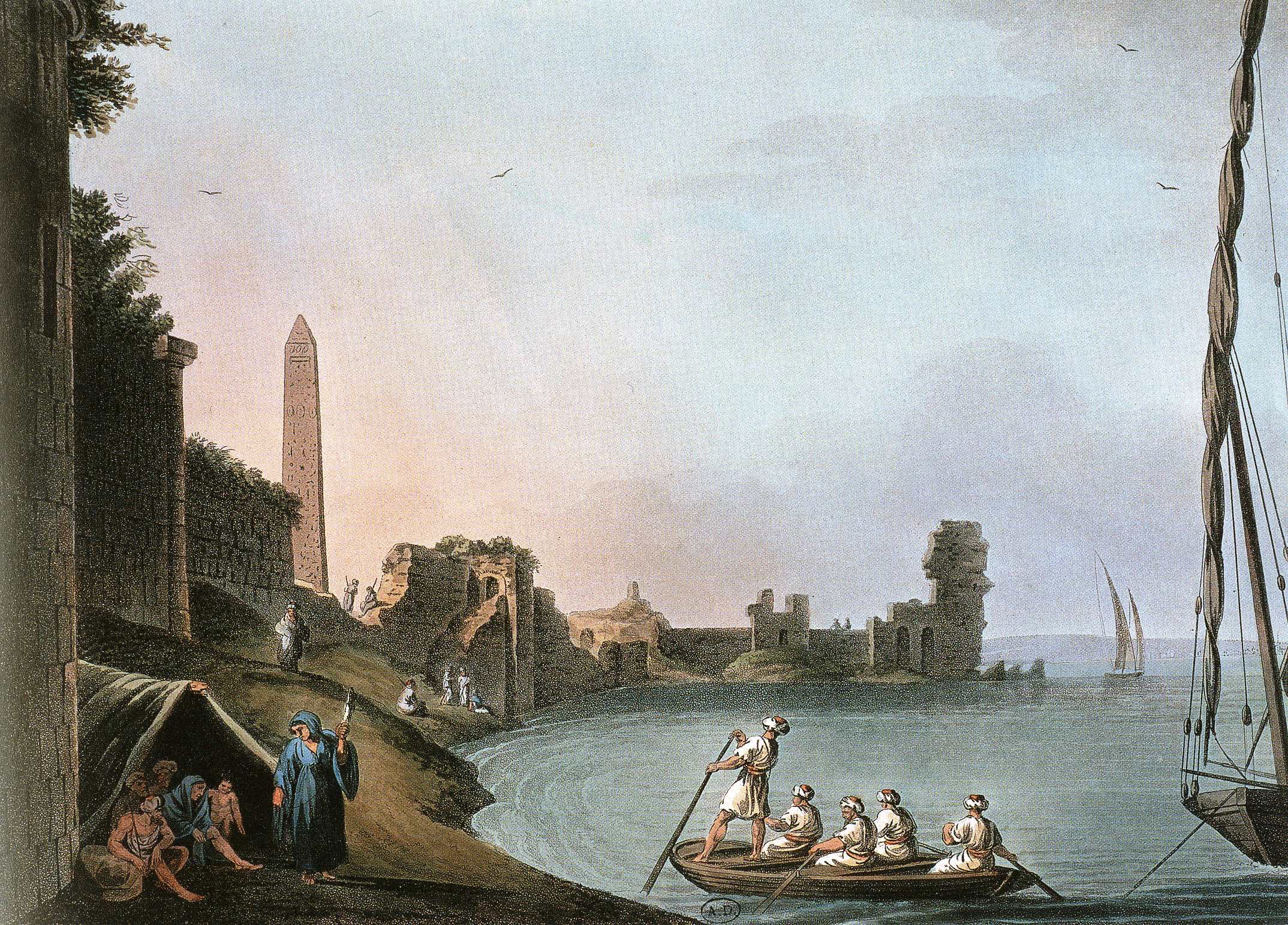
1803 (only New York needle visible)

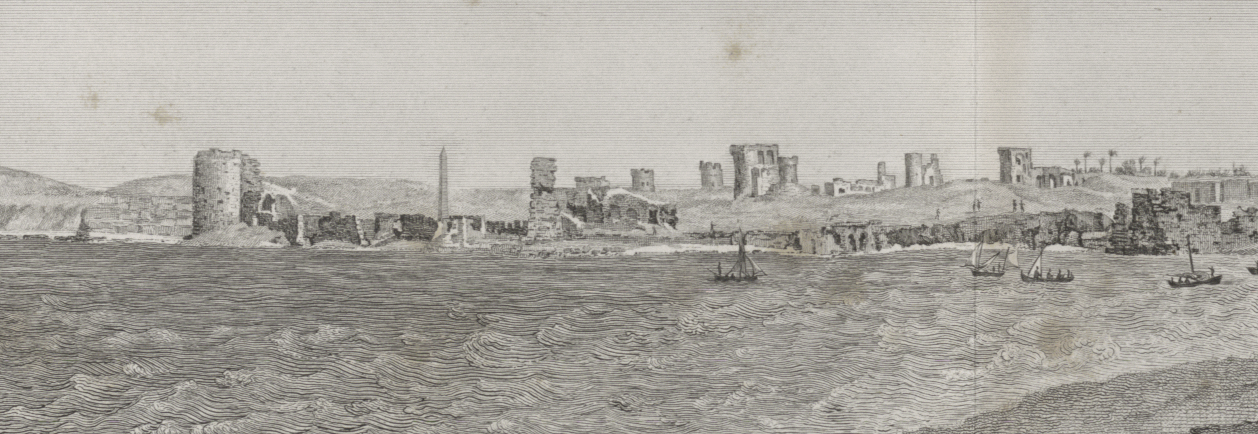
1809 (only New York needle visible)

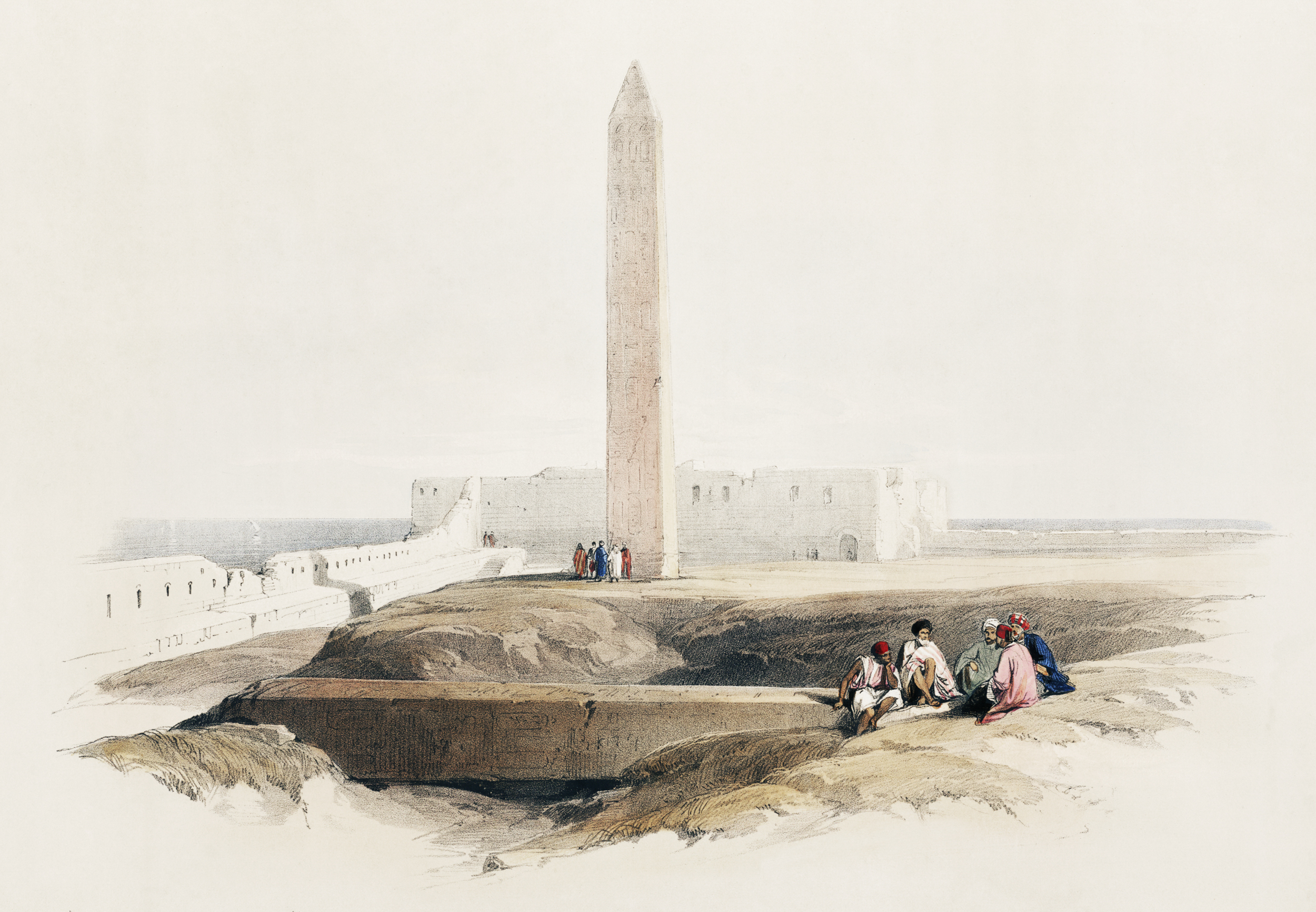
1830s lithograph from David Robert's The Holy Land, Syria, Idumea, Arabia, Egypt, and Nubia

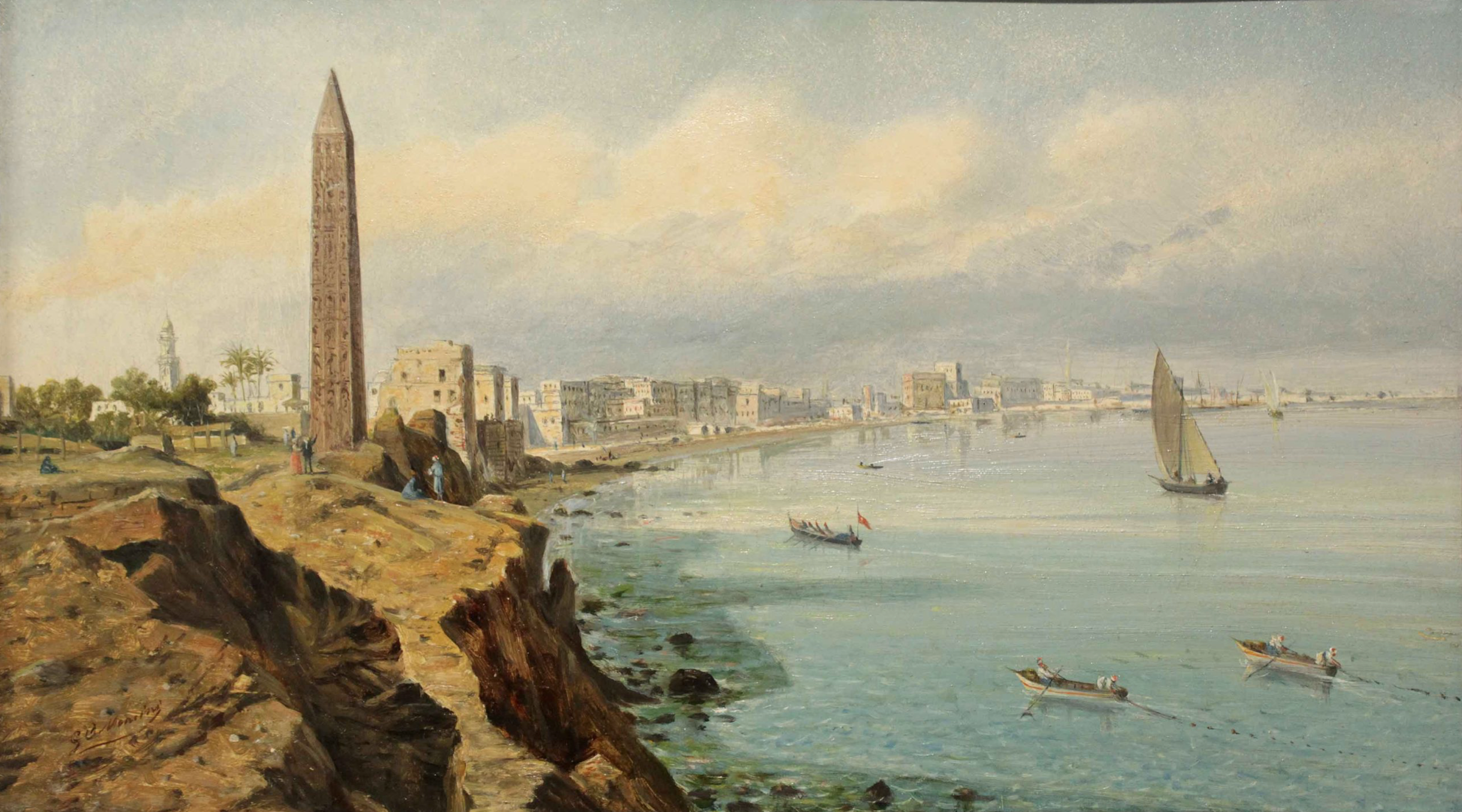
1870s, by Carlo Mancini

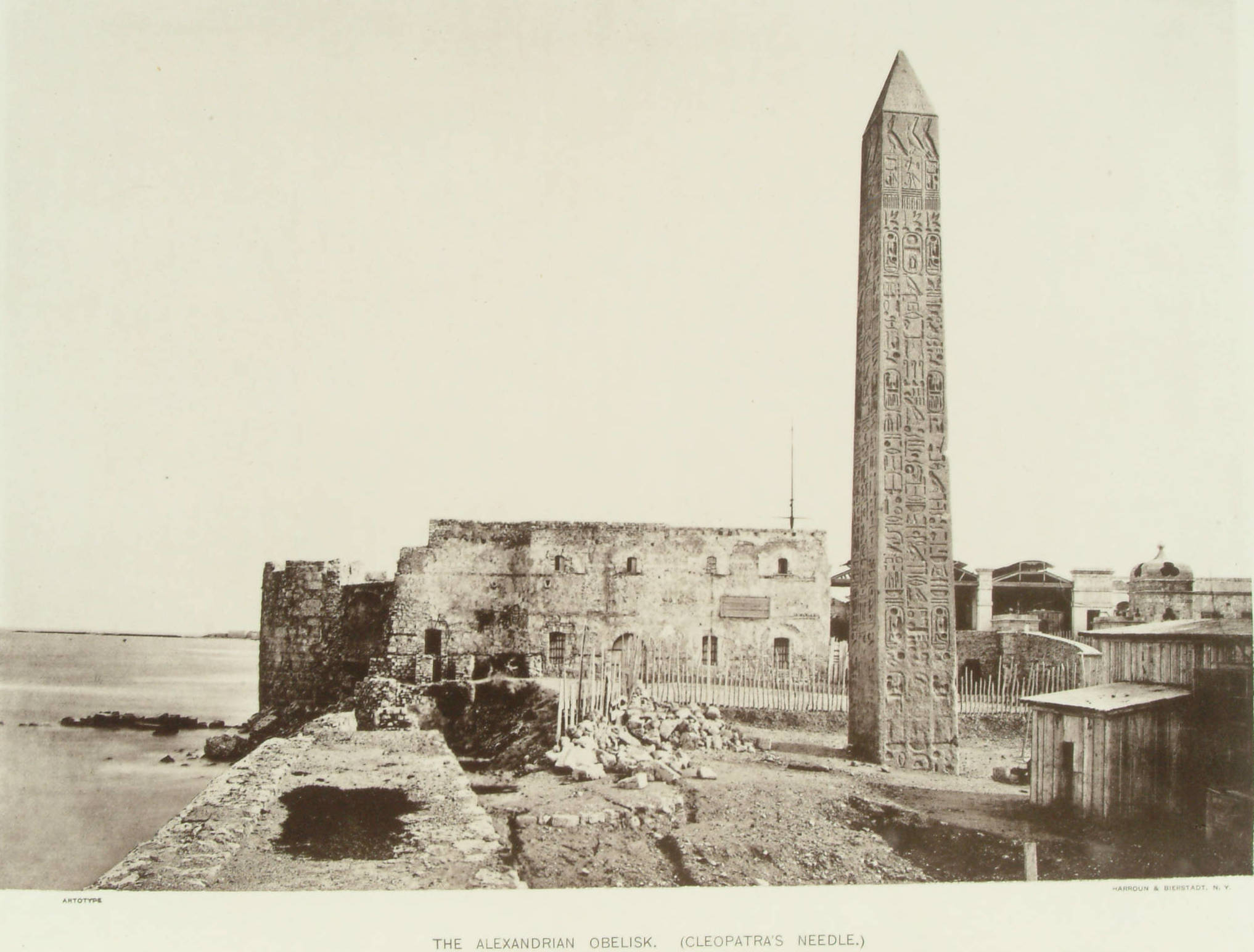
1880 (New York needle only)

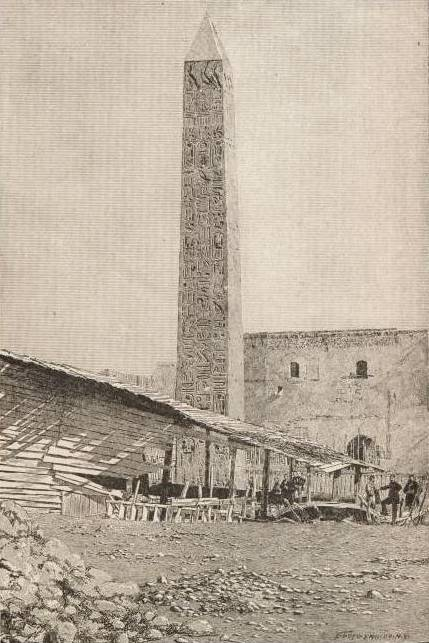
1884 (New York needle)

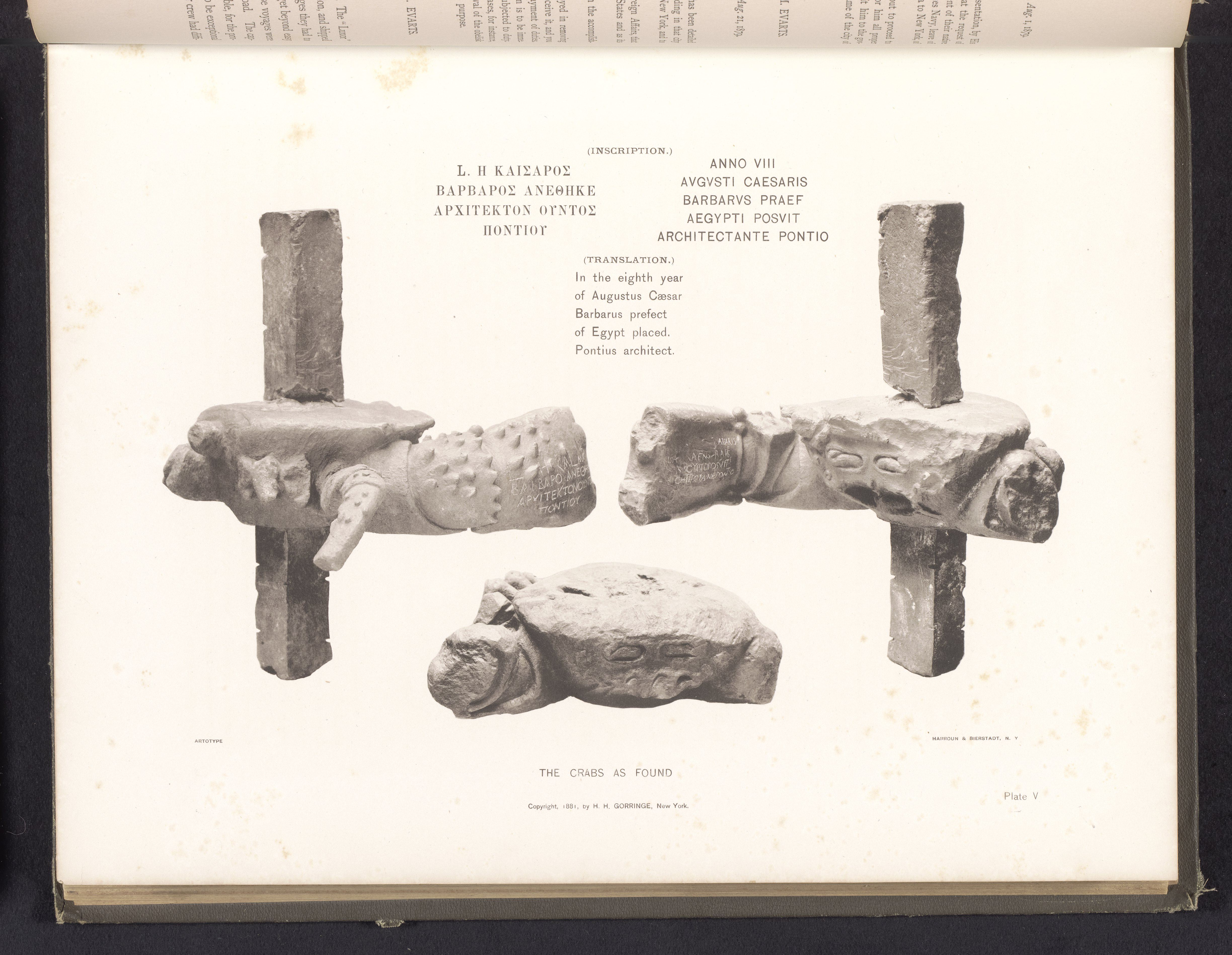
The inscribed crabs, as they were found

=== In London and New York ===
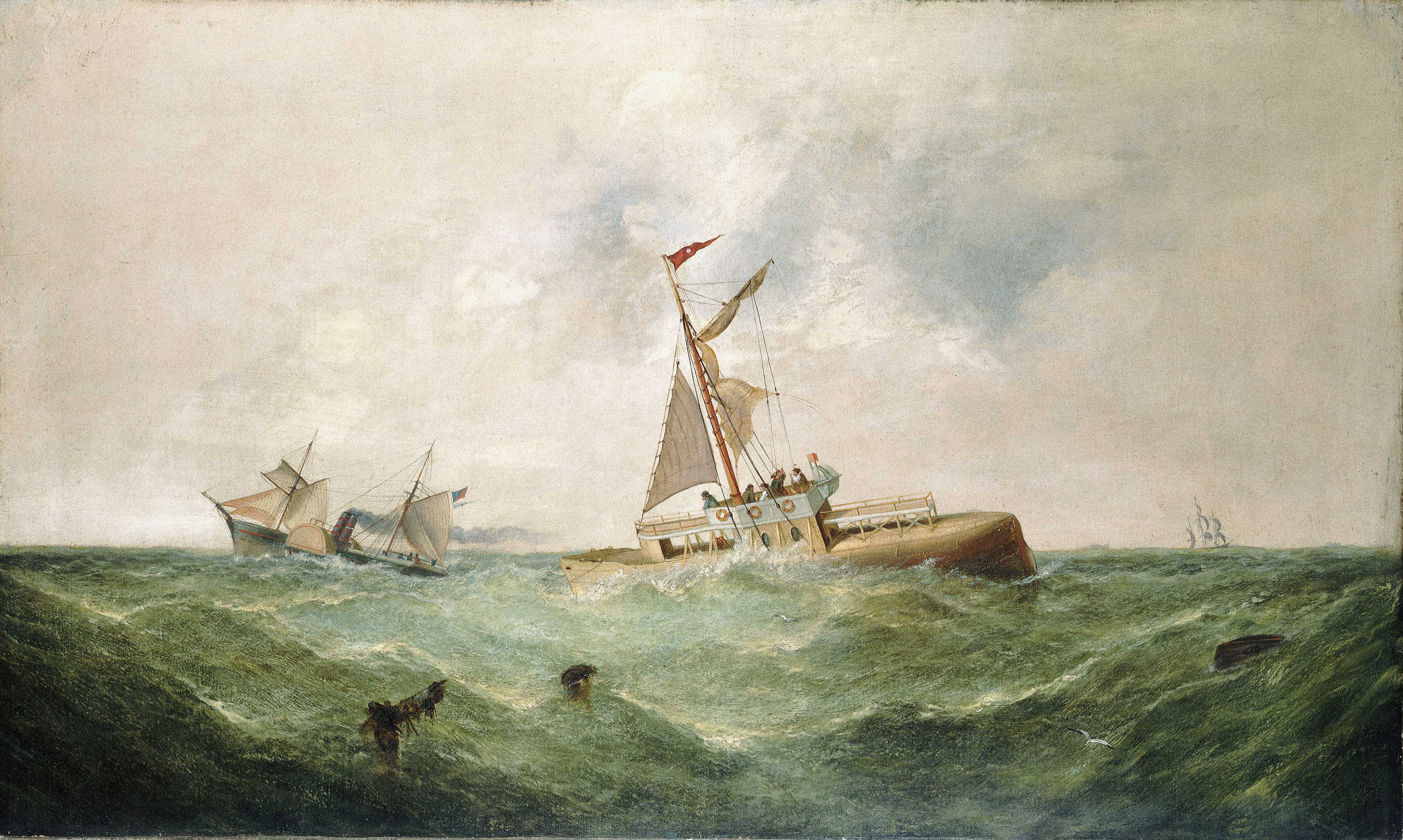
Cleopatra's needle being brought to England, George Knight, 1877

Victoria Embankment by C.R.W. Nevinson, 1924

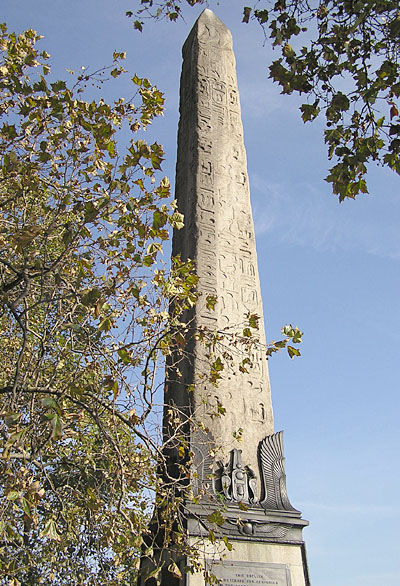
Close-up of London's Cleopatra's Needle

View of London's needle from mid-Thames, 2009

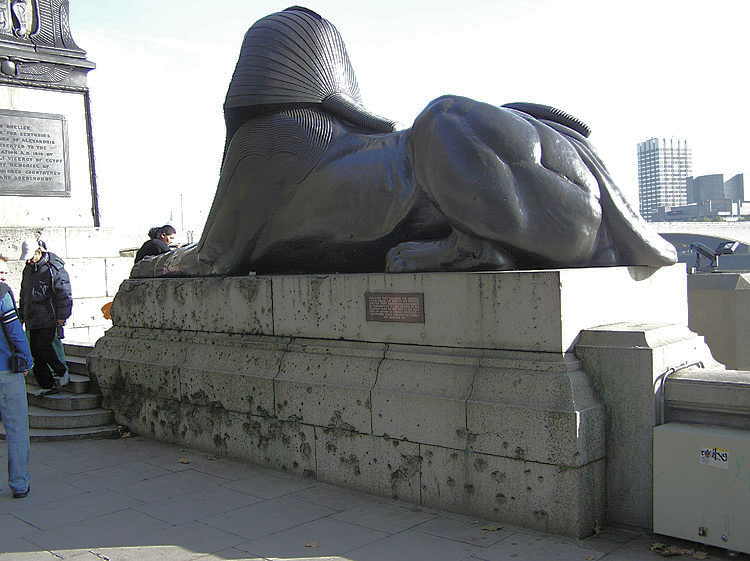
One of two sphinxes at the base of London's Cleopatra's Needle. The scars on the pedestal were from fragments of a bomb dropped during a World War I airstrike.

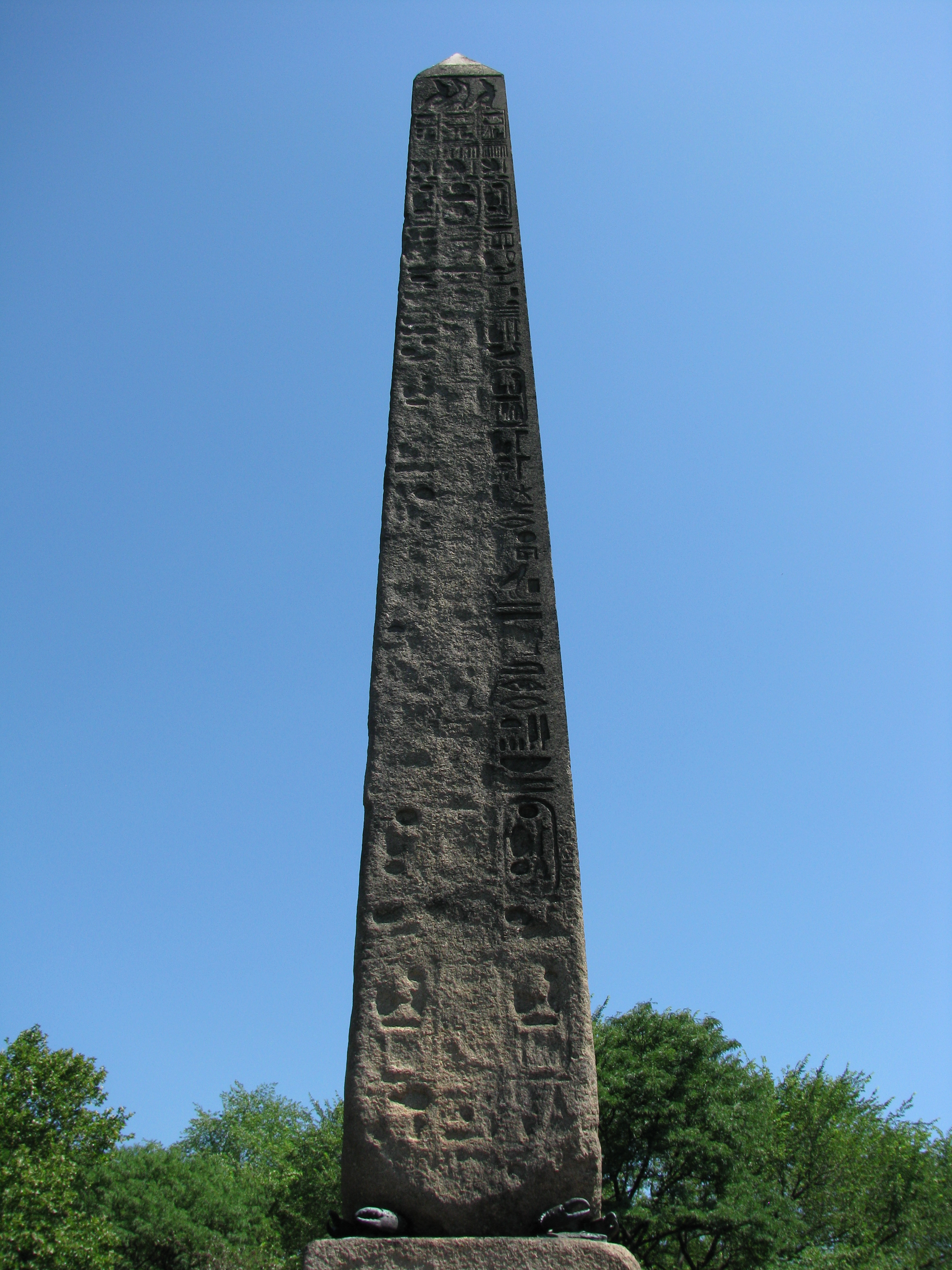
Close-up of one side of New York's Cleopatra's Needle
