= Cleopatra's Needle (New York City) =

Ancient Egyptian obelisk in Central Park

Coordinates: 40.779612°N 73.965414°W

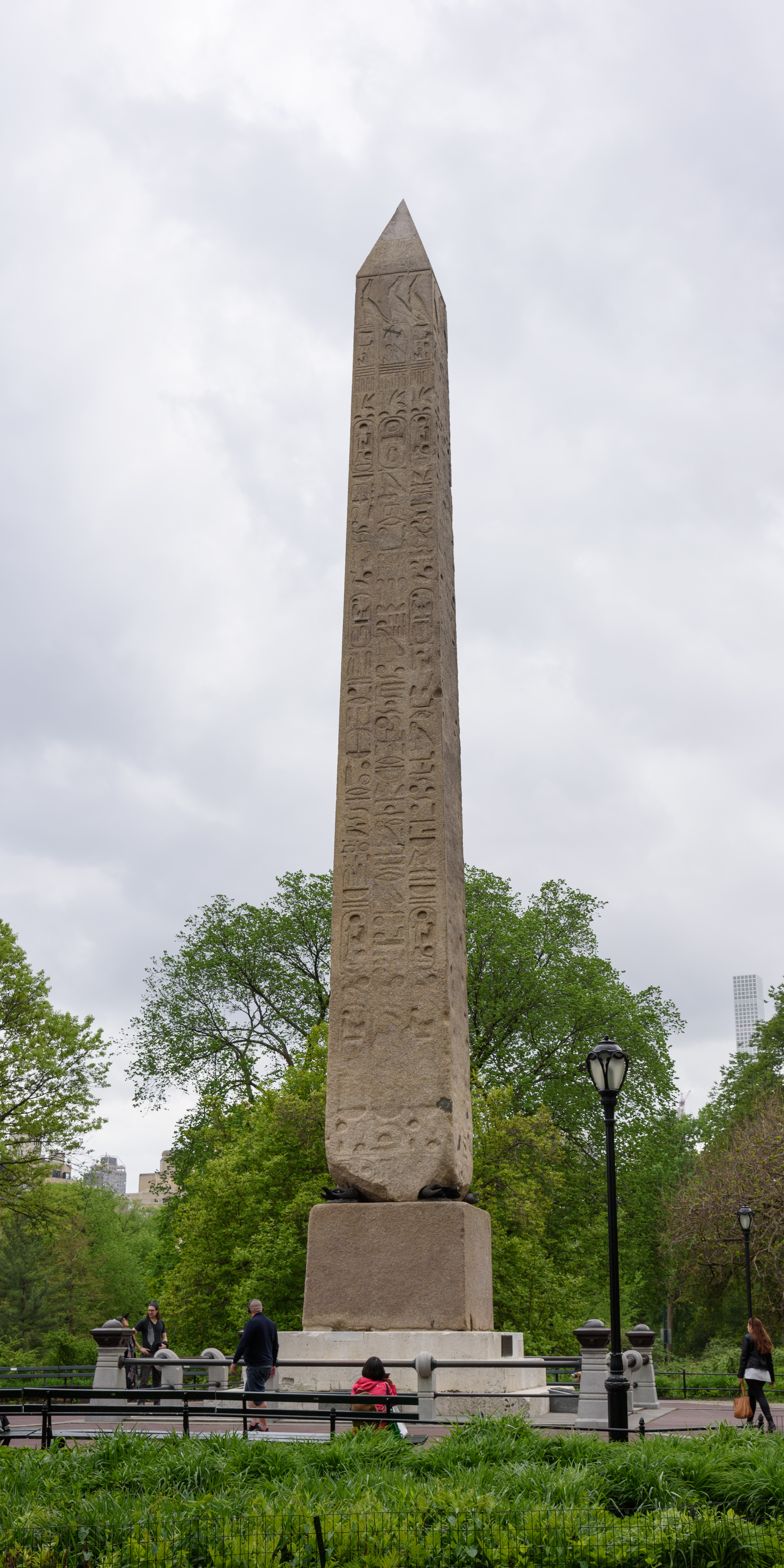
Cleopatra's Needle in Central Park, New York City (2017)

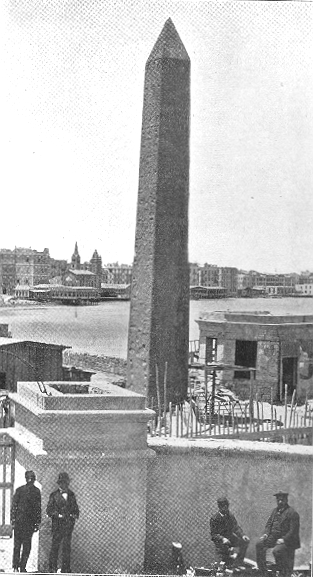
Cleopatra's Needle as it originally stood in Alexandria (1880)

Cleopatra's Needle in New York City is one of a pair of obelisks, together named Cleopatra's Needles, that were moved from the ruins of the Caesareum of Alexandria, Ancient Egypt, in the 19th century. The stele, dating from the 15th century B.C., was installed in Central Park, west of the Metropolitan Museum of Art's main building in Manhattan, on February 22, 1881. It was secured in May 1877 by judge Elbert E. Farman, the United States Consul General at Cairo, as a gift from the Khedive for the United States remaining a friendly neutral as two European powers, France and Britain, maneuvered for political control of the Egyptian government. The transportation costs were largely paid by a railroad magnate, William Henry Vanderbilt, the eldest son of Cornelius Vanderbilt.

== History ==
=== Antiquity ===
Made of red granite, the obelisk stands about 21 metres (69 ft) high, weighs about 200 tons, and is inscribed with Egyptian hieroglyphs. Originally erected in the Egyptian city of Heliopolis on the orders of Thutmose III, in 1475 BC, the obelisk's granite was mined from the quarries of Aswan near the first cataract of the Nile. The inscriptions were added about 200 years later by Ramesses II to commemorate his military victories.

In 13/12 BC, during the reign of Augustus, the obelisks were moved by the Romans to Alexandria and set up in the Caesareum—a temple originally built by Cleopatra in honor of Mark Antony or Julius Caesar.

=== American acquisition ===
The idea to secure an Egyptian obelisk for New York City came from the March 1877 New York City newspaper accounts of the transporting of the London obelisk. The newspapers mistakenly attributed to a John Dixon the 1869 proposal of the Khedive of Egypt, Isma'il Pasha, to give the United States an obelisk as a gift for increased trade. Dixon, the contractor who, in 1877, arranged the transport of the London obelisk, denied the newspaper accounts.

In March 1877, Henry G. Stebbins, Commissioner of the Department of Public Parks of the City of New York, undertook to secure the funding to transport the obelisk to New York. However, when railroad magnate William H. Vanderbilt was asked to head the subscription, he offered to finance the project with a donation of more than US$100,000 (equivalent to $3,023,438 in 2025).

Stebbins then sent two acceptance letters to the Khedive through the Department of State which forwarded them to Judge Farman in Cairo. Realizing that he might be able to secure one of the two remaining upright obelisks—either the mate to the Paris obelisk in Luxor or the London mate in Alexandria—Judge Farman formally asked the Khedive in March 1877, and by May 1877 he had secured the gift in writing.

=== Importing ===
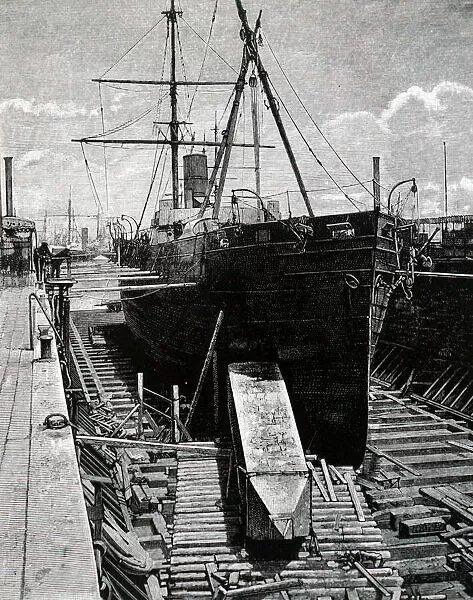
Placing the obelisk in the hold of the steamship Dessoug

The formidable task of moving the obelisk from Alexandria to New York was given to Henry Honychurch Gorringe, a lieutenant commander on leave from the U.S. Navy. The 200-ton granite obelisk was first shifted from vertical to horizontal, nearly crashing to the ground in the process. In August 1879 the movement process was suspended for two months because of local protests and legal challenges. Once those were resolved, the obelisk was transported seven miles to Alexandria and then put into the hold of the steamship SS Dessoug, which set sail June 12, 1880. The Dessoug was heavily modified with a large hole cut into the starboard side of its bow. The obelisk was loaded through the ship's hull by rolling it upon cannonballs.

Even with a broken propeller, the SS Dessoug was able to make the journey to the United States. The obelisk and its 50-ton pedestal arrived at the Quarantine Station in New York in early July 1880. It took 32 horses hitched in pairs to bring it from the banks of the East River to Central Park. Railroad ramps and tracks had to be temporarily removed and the ground flattened so that the obelisk could be rolled out of the ship, whose side had been cut open once again for the purpose. The obelisk was carried up the East River and transported to a temporary location off Fifth Avenue. The final leg of the journey was made by pushing the obelisk with a steam engine across a specially built trestle bridge from Fifth Avenue to its new home on Greywacke Knoll, just across the drive from the Metropolitan Museum of Art. It took 112 days to move the obelisk from Quarantine Station to its resting place.

Jesse B. Anthony, Grand Master of Masons in the State of New York, presided as the cornerstone for the obelisk was laid in place with full Masonic ceremony on October 2, 1880. Over 9,000 Masons paraded up Fifth Avenue from 14th Street to 82nd Street, and it was estimated that over 50,000 spectators lined the parade route. The benediction was presented by Rev. J. Bradford Cleaver. The obelisk was righted by a special structure built by Henry Honychurch Gorringe. The official ceremony for erecting the obelisk was held January 22, 1881. The event was commemorated a month later with another ceremony inside the Metropolitan Museum of Art. A time capsule buried beneath the obelisk contains an 1870 U.S. census, a Bible, a Webster's Dictionary, the complete works of William Shakespeare, a guide to Egypt, and a copy of the United States Declaration of Independence. A small box was also placed in the capsule by the man who arranged the obelisk's purchase and transportation, but its contents remain unknown.

== Location ==
Notable buildings and structures of Central Park. Click on the map and then on the points for details.

The obelisk was placed on an obscure site behind the museum. Henry Honeychurch Gorringe, who supervised the movement of the obelisk, William Henry Hurlbert, who was involved in early development of the plan, and Frederic Edwin Church, a cofounder of the Metropolitan Museum of Art and a member of the Department of Public Parks in New York City, selected the site of the obelisk in 1879. Gorringe wrote, "In order to avoid needless discussion of the subject, it was decided to maintain the strictest secrecy as to the location determined on." He noted that the prime advantage of the Knoll was its "isolation" and that it was the best site to be found inside the park, as it was quite elevated and the foundation could be firmly anchored in bedrock, lest Manhattan suffer "some violent convulsion of nature."

== Hieroglyphs ==
In New York the stone experienced significant degradation since its installation in 1881, largely due to the harsh environmental conditions of New York. Photographs taken near the time the obelisk was erected in the park show that the inscriptions or hieroglyphs, as depicted below with translation, were quite legible and date first from Thutmosis III (1479–1425 BC) and then nearly 300 years later, Ramesses II the Great (1279–1213 BC).

While the 3,500-year-old monument had undergone little weathering in the clear dry Egyptian desert air, exposure to acid rain, pollution, and freeze-thaw cycles has caused its red granite surface to deteriorate, particularly causing the hieroglyphs to fade and chip away.

In 2010, Zahi Hawass, then-Egypt’s Minister of Antiquities, sent an open letter to the president of the Central Park Conservancy and the Mayor of New York City insisting on improved conservation efforts. If they were not able to properly care for the obelisk, he threatened to "take the necessary steps to bring this precious artifact home and save it from ruin".

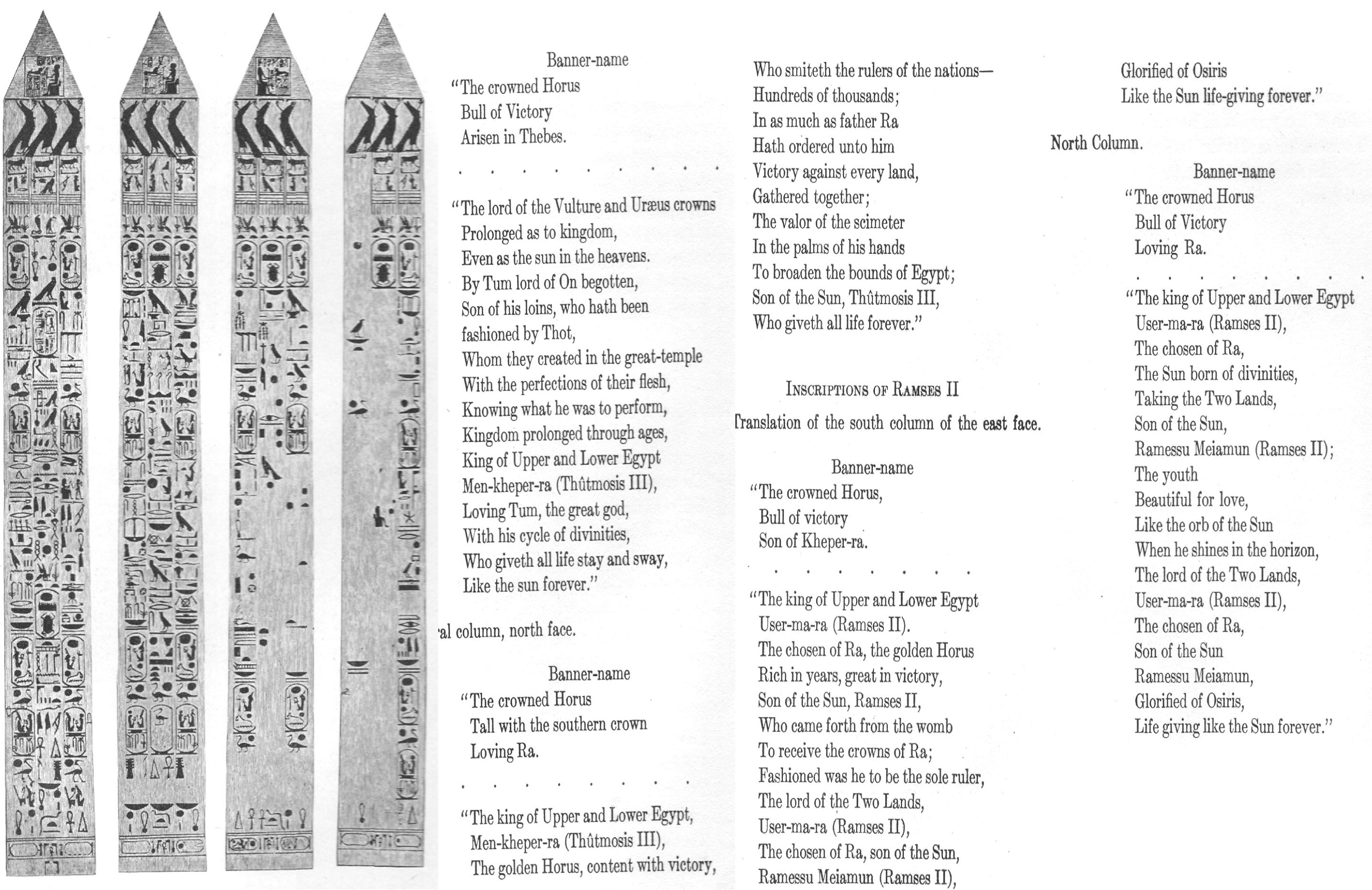
The east, north, west, and south faces of the obelisk, respectively (left) and the obelisk's hieroglyphs with translations (right)

== See also ==
- List of Egyptian obelisks
