= Victoria Embankment (painting) =

Painting by C.R.W. Nevinson

- Artist: C.R.W. Nevinson
- Year: 1924
- Type: Oil on canvas, landscape painting
- Dimensions: 65.9 cm × 79 cm (25.9 in × 31 in)
- Location: Museum of London, London

Victoria Embankment is an oil on canvas landscape painting by the British artist C.R.W. Nevinson, from 1924.

== History and description ==
A cityscape, it features a view of the River Thames from the Victoria Embankment in Central London. It is seen from a window of the Savoy Hotel and includes noted landmarks such as Cleopatra's Needle and the Houses of Parliament. The Victoria Embankment Gardens are on the right, while trains cross Hungerford Bridge nearby Charing Cross Station. Produced during the winter, it emphasises the seasonal light.

Nevinson was known as a pioneering British Futurist and for his depictions of the First World War. Today the painting is in the collection of the Museum of London, which acquired it in 1959.

== Bibliography ==
- Corton, Christine L. London Fog: The Biography. Harvard University Press, 2015.
- Galinou, Mireille & Hayes, John. London in Paint: Oil Paintings in the Collection at the Museum of London. The Museum, 1996.
- Ingleby, Richard. C.R.W. Nevinson: The Twentieth Century. Merrell Holberton, 1999.
- Ross, Catherine. Twenties London: A City in the Jazz Age. Bloomsbury, 2003.
