= James Edward Alexander =

Scottish soldier, traveller and author (1803–1885)

Sir James Edward Alexander Kt KStJ CB KLS FRSE FRGS
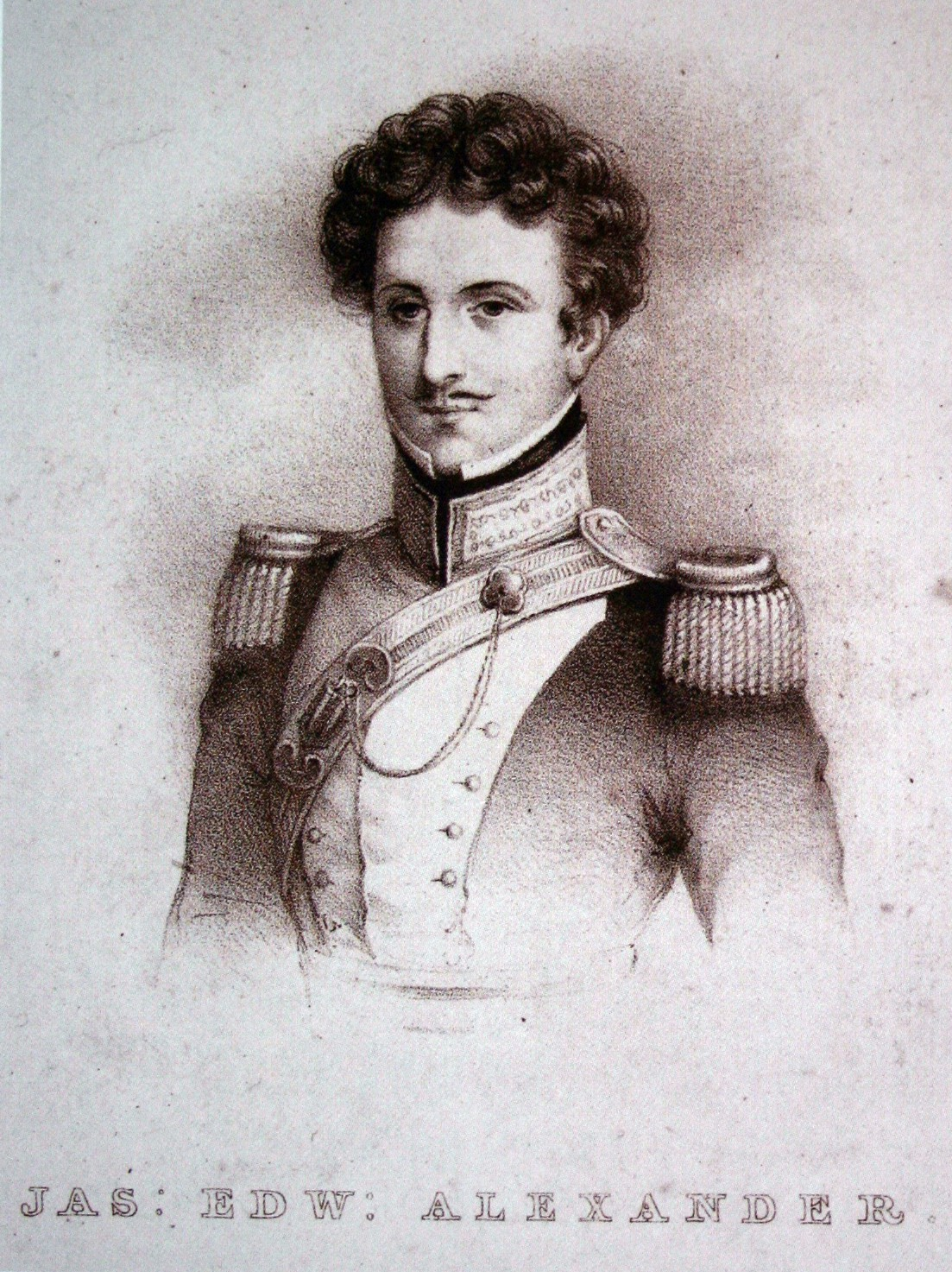
- James Edward Alexander, 1827; National Portrait Gallery, London
- Born: 16 October 1803; Stirling, Scotland
- Died: 2 April 1885 (aged 81); Ryde, Isle of Wight
- Burial place: Old Logie Kirkyard near Menstrie
- Education: Royal Military College, Sandhurst
- Spouse: Eveline Marie Mitchell (m. 1837)
- Military career
- Allegiance: United Kingdom
- Branch: East India Company Army (United Kingdom of Great Britain and Ireland) British Army
- Rank: General
- Units: Madras Light Cavalry, 1820–; 1st Madras Light Cavalry, 1821–; 13th Light Dragoons, 1825–; 16th Light Dragoons, 1827–; 42nd Regiment, 1832–; 14th Regiment, 1840–
- Campaigns: First Burma War; Russo-Persian War; 6th Cape Frontier War; Crimean War; Siege of Sebastopol; Battle of the Chernaya; New Zealand Wars; First Taranaki War; Invasion of the Waikato
- Awards: Knight Bachelor, 1838; Order of Saint John, Knight of Justice, 1842; Companion of the Order of the Bath, 1873; Order of the Lion and the Sun (2nd Class), 1828; Order of the Crescent (2nd Class); Order of the Medjidie (5th Class), 1858; Army of India Medal, Ava clasp; Al Valore Militare Medal, 1828–29; South Africa Medal, 1853 Crimea Medal, Sebastopol clasp Turkish Crimea Medal, Sardinian issue; New Zealand War Medal, 1860–66

General Sir James Edward Alexander Kt KStJ CB KLS FRSE FRGS (16 October 1803 – 2 April 1885) was a Scottish traveller, writer and soldier in the British Army.

Alexander was the driving force behind the placement of Cleopatra's Needle on the Thames Embankment.

== Background ==
Born in Stirling, he was the eldest son of Edward Alexander of Powis, Clackmannanshire, and his second wife Catherine Glas, daughter of John Glas, Provost of Stirling.

The family purchased Powis House near Stirling in 1808 from James Mayne (his uncle by marriage) for £26,500. His father, a banker, had to sell Powis House in 1827 on collapse of the Stirling Banking Company. He received his training in Edinburgh, Glasgow, and the Royal Military College, Sandhurst.

In 1837, he married Eveline Marie Mitchell (16 April 1821 – 1906), daughter of Colonel Charles Collier Michell, RA, surveyor general of Cape of Good Hope, in Cape Town on 25 October 1837.

In 1853, he obtained Westerton House in Bridge of Allan, built in 1803 by Dr John Henderson of the East India Company (a cousin and friend). Here he became an elder of Logie Kirk, walking there each Sunday.

He died in Ryde on the Isle of Wight but is buried in Old Logie Churchyard just east of his home town of Stirling. The graveyard lies several hundred metres north of Logie Cemetery and the 19th century Logie Kirk.

After his death, his trustees sold Westerton House to Edmund Pullar.

== Military career ==
In 1820, he joined the British East India Company's army, transferring into the British Army in 1825. As aide-de-camp to the British envoy to Persia, he witnessed fighting during the war between Persia and Russia in 1826 and in 1829 was present in the Balkans during the Russo-Turkish War, 1828-1829.

From 1832 to 1834, he witnessed the War of the Two Brothers in Portugal, and in 1835 he took part in the 6th Cape Frontier War in South Africa as aide-de-camp and private secretary to Sir Benjamin d'Urban.

In 1838, he was made a Knight Bachelor for his services. From 1841, he served in Canada, among others in the staff of Sir William Rowan. During the Crimean War, he commanded the 14th (Buckinghamshire) Regiment of Foot as lieutenant-colonel in the Siege of Sevastopol in 1855 and held an important command during the New Zealand Wars, from 1860 to 1862. Alexander published two books based on his experiences in New Zealand. He retired from active service in 1877 and on 1 July 1881 was given the honorary rank of general.

== Explorer ==
On behalf of the Royal Geographical Society (which he had co-founded), he conducted an exploring expedition into Namaqualand and Damaraland, lasting from 8 September 1836 to 21 September 1837, in the course of which he collected rock specimens, pelts of rare animals, bird skins, weapons and implements from the Herero and Nama, as well as drawing maps of the region and making a first list of Herero words.

Subsequently, John Arrowsmith (cartographer) made use of his data to draw a map accompanying his book of the expedition. Alexander Bay on the Orange River mouth, is named after him.

In 1877, he was largely responsible for the preservation and transfer of Cleopatra's Needle to England.

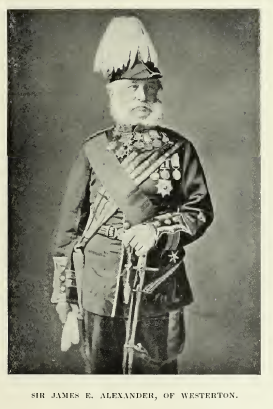
General Sir James Edward Alexander c.1880

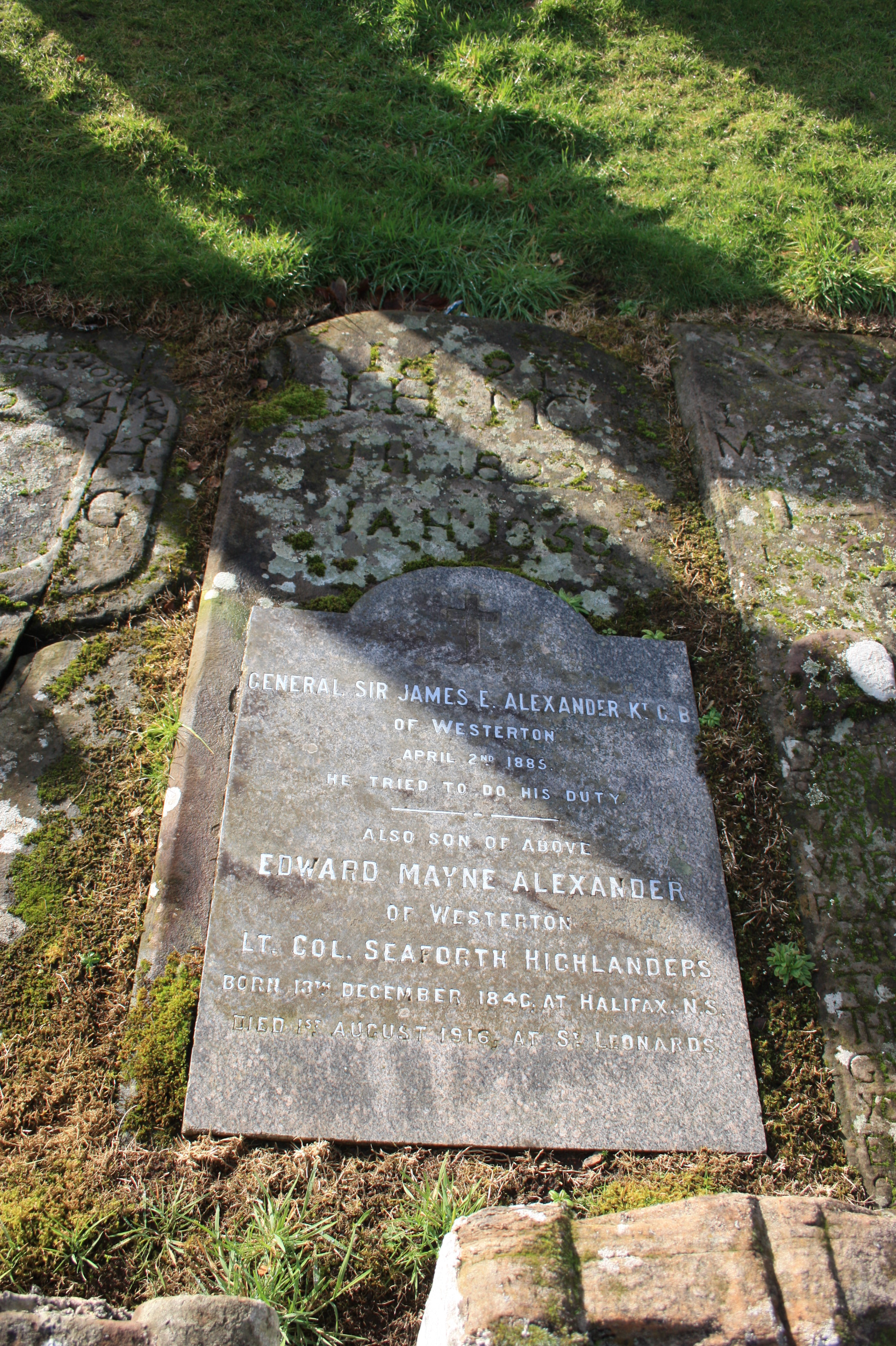
The grave of General Sir James Edward Alexander, Old Logie Kirkyard

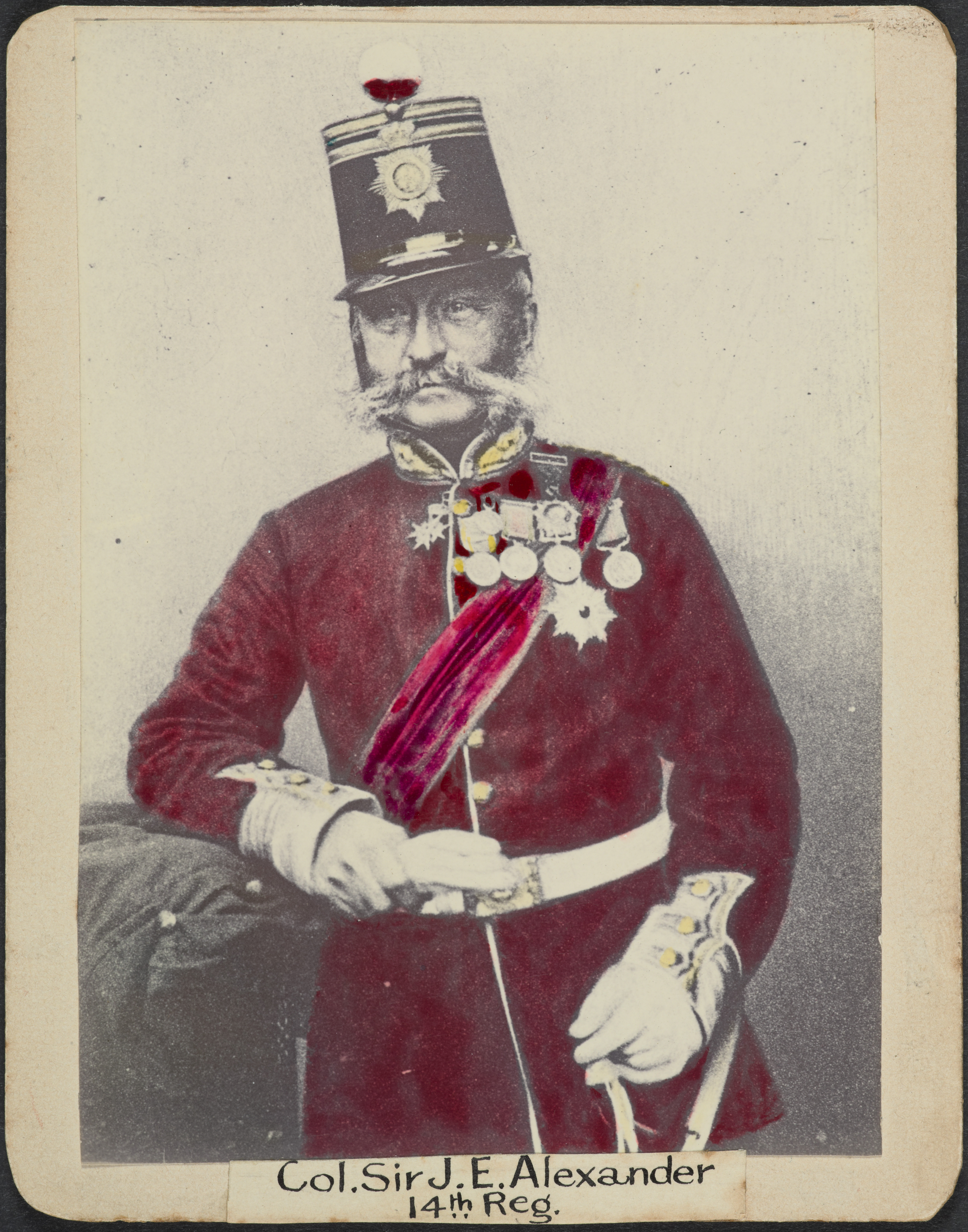
Colonel Sir J. E. Alexander, 14th reg., circa 1860, maker unknown. Purchased 1916. Te Papa (O.011941)

== Works ==
- Alexander, James Edward (1827). Travels from India to England: Comprehending a Visit to the Burman Empire, and a Journey Through Persia, Asia Minor, European Turkey, &c. In the years 1825–26. London: Parbury, Allen, & Co.
- Alexander, James Edward (1830). Travels to the Seat of War in the East, through Russia and the Crimea, in 1829. With Sketches of the Imperial Fleet and Army, Personal Adventures, and Characteristic Anecdotes. Vol. 1. London: Henry Colburn and Richard Bentley.
- Alexander, James Edward (1830). Travels to the Seat of War in the East, through Russia and the Crimea, in 1829. With Sketches of the Imperial Fleet and Army, Personal Adventures, and Characteristic Anecdotes. Vol. 2. London: Henry Colburn and Richard Bentley.
- Alexander, James Edward (1833). Transatlantic Sketches: Comprising Visits to the Most Interesting Scenes in North & South America & West Indies with Notes on Negro Slavery and Canadian Emigration. Vol. 1. London: Richard Bentley.
- Alexander, James Edward (1833). Transatlantic Sketches: Comprising Visits to the Most Interesting Scenes in North & South America & West Indies with Notes on Negro Slavery and Canadian Emigration. Vol. 2. London: Richard Bentley.
- Alexander, James Edward (1835). Sketches in Portugal During the Civil War of 1834: With Observations on the Present State and Future Prospects of Portugal. London: James Cochrane and Co. – via National Library of Portugal.
- Alexander, James Edward (1837). Narrative of a Voyage of Observation among the Colonies of Western Africa, in the Flag-Ship Thalia; and of a Campaign in Kaffir-Land, on the Staff of the Commander-in-Chief, in 1835. Vol. 1. London: Henry Colburn.
- Alexander, James Edward (1837). Narrative of a Voyage of Observation among the Colonies of Western Africa, in the Flag-Ship Thalia; and of a Campaign in Kaffir-Land, on the Staff of the Commander-in-Chief, in 1835. Vol. 2. London: Henry Colburn.
- Alexander, James Edward (1838). An Expedition of Discovery into the Interior of Africa: Through the Hitherto Undescribed Countries of the Great Namaquas, Boschmans, and Hill Damaras, Performed Under the Auspices of Her Majesty's Government and the Royal Geographical Society. Vol. 1. London: Henry Colburn – via BHL.
- Alexander, James Edward (1838). An Expedition of Discovery into the Interior of Africa: Through the Hitherto Undescribed Countries of the Great Namaquas, Boschmans, and Hill Damaras, Performed Under the Auspices of Her Majesty's Government and the Royal Geographical Society. Vol. 2. London: Henry Colburn.
- Alexander, James Edward (1839). Life of Field Marshal, His Grace the Duke of Wellington: Embracing His Civil, Military, and Political Career to the Present Time. Vol. 1. London: Henry Colbourn.
- Alexander, James Edward (1840). Life of Field Marshal, His Grace the Duke of Wellington: Embracing His Civil, Military, and Political Career to the Present Time. Vol. 2. London: Henry Colbourn.
- Alexander, James Edward (1849). L'Acadie: or Seven Years' Explorations in British America. Vol. 1. London: Henry Colburn.
- Alexander, James Edward (1849). L'Acadie: or Seven Years' Explorations in British America. Vol. 2. London: Henry Colburn.
- Alexander, James Edward (1857). Passages in the Life of a Soldier, or, Military Service in the East and West. Vol. 1. London: Hurst & Blackett.
- Alexander, James Edward (1857). Passages in the Life of a Soldier, or, Military Service in the East and West. Vol. 2. London: Hurst & Blackett.
- Adamson, William Agar (1860). Alexander, James Edward (ed.). Salmon-Fishing in Canada. London: Longman, Green, Longman, and Roberts. doi:10.5962/bhl.title.56138 – via BHL.
- Alexander, James Edward (1863). Incidents of the last Maori-War in New Zealand, with Illustrations of Native Character, and the Prospects of Intending Colonists. London: Richard Bentley.
- Alexander, James Edward, ed. (1863). The Albatross: Record of Voyage of the "Great Britain" Steam Ship from Victoria to England in 1862. Stirling: Charles Rogers & Co. – via Trove.
- Alexander, James Edward (1865). Notes on the Maories of New Zealand: with Suggestions for their Pacification and Preservation. London: Aborigines' Protection Society.
- Alexander, James Edward (1873). Bush Fighting: Illustrated by Remarkable Actions and Incidents of the Maori War in New Zealand. London: Sampson Low, Marston, Low and Searle. nla.obj-12875072.
- Alexander, James Edward (1879). Cleopatra's Needle, the Obelisk of Alexandria: Its Acquisition and Removal to England. London: Chatto & Windus.
