= Lady Eveline Marie Alexander =

Canadian painter

- Born: Eveline Marie Michell; 16 April 1821; Nantes, France
- Died: 1906 (aged 84–85); Isle of Wight, Hampshire, England
- Known for: Painting
- Spouse: Sir James Edward Alexander (m. 1837)

Lady Eveline Marie Alexander (16 April 1821 – 1906) was a British/Canadian self-taught artist.

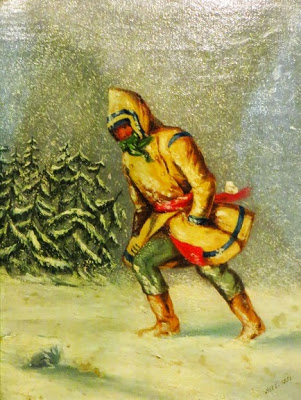
Painting of a Man In the Snow by Lady Eveline Marie Alexander

== Biography ==
Alexander née Michell was born on 16 April 1821 in Nantes, France.

While there is little known about Lady Eveline Marie Alexander, she is now well known for being an amateur painter whose primary skills were in oil and watercolor. The exact way she learned how to paint is still unknown. She had no official training, it is believed she learned from her father, who was a military drawing master at Royal Military College, Woolwich.

In 1837, she married Sir James Edward Alexander and the couple had five children.

She accompanied her military husband on a Canadian tour of duty from 1841 to 1849, when she settled in London, Ontario. In 1843 she painted a scene of a military steeple chase, which was turned into a popular lithograph.

Alexander died on the Isle of Wight in 1906.

== Artwork ==
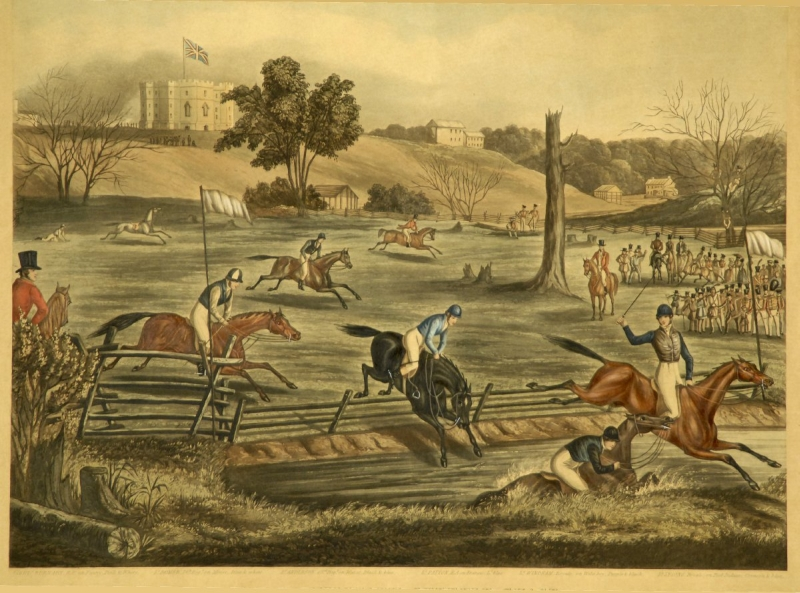
Grand Military Steeple Chase by Lady Eveline Marie Alexander

Lady Eveline was also known for her sleighing scenes in art. She was associated with this name due to the winter sleighing scene which was completed in watercolor and is theorized to have been given to the Bells as a keepsake of the "Sleigh Society." She had a tendency to often paint or draw winter scenes. An example of this is one of her drawings of an indigenous man trudging through a snowstorm.

In 1841 through 1849, Lady Eveline joined Sir James Edward Alexander while he was being stationed in London, Ontario during his Canadian tour. During this time her husband was in the 14th Regiment of Foot and aide-de-camp to Sir Benjamin D'Urban and Sir William Rowan. While stationed during the Canadian tour, she created a sketch depicting her surroundings which was of the military steeplechase and was lithographed. This came to be one of her most known works, the first military steeplechase to occur North America in May 1843. It was titled Grand Military Steeple Chase.
