= Caesareum of Alexandria =

Ancient temple in Alexandria, Egypt

Coordinates: 31.2009°N 29.8994°E

Caesareum
- Interactive map of the Caesareum area

General information
- Status: Destroyed
- Type: Built as a temple; converted to a Christian church (late-4th century)
- Location: Alexandria, Egypt
- Completed: 1st century BC
- Renovated: 4th century (converted to Christian church)
- Destroyed: 19th century
- Client: • Cleopatra VII (started) • Augustus (finished)

The Caesareum of Alexandria is an ancient temple in Alexandria, Egypt. It was conceived by Cleopatra VII of the Ptolemaic kingdom, the last pharaoh of ancient Egypt, to honour her first known lover Julius Caesar or Mark Antony. The edifice was finished by the Roman emperor Augustus, after he defeated Mark Antony and Cleopatra in Egypt. He destroyed all traces of Antony in Alexandria, and apparently dedicated the temple to his own cult.

Converted to a Christian church in the late 4th century, the Caesareum was the headquarters of Cyril of Alexandria, the Patriarch of Alexandria from 412 to 444.

The philosopher and mathematician Hypatia was murdered at the Caesareum by a Christian mob in 415; they stripped her naked and tore her to pieces.

Elements of the temple survived until the 19th century. Cleopatra's Needles, two much earlier obelisks moved to the temple in ancient times, now stand in Central Park in New York City and on the Thames Embankment, in London. The underwater archaeological work of Franck Goddio and the European Institute for Underwater Archaeology (IEASM) in the eastern harbour of Alexandria has added to the knowledge about the Caesareum. An article "The Caesarium", published in 2021, reveals that the groundworks were started prior to the reign of Cleopatra VII. It also considers the building's relationship with the harbour based on ancient texts and the position of Cleopatra's Needles and it provides some indications about the siting of the temple itself.

Today, a large statue of the Alexandrine nationalist leader Saad Zaghloul (1859–1927) stands on the Caesareum site.

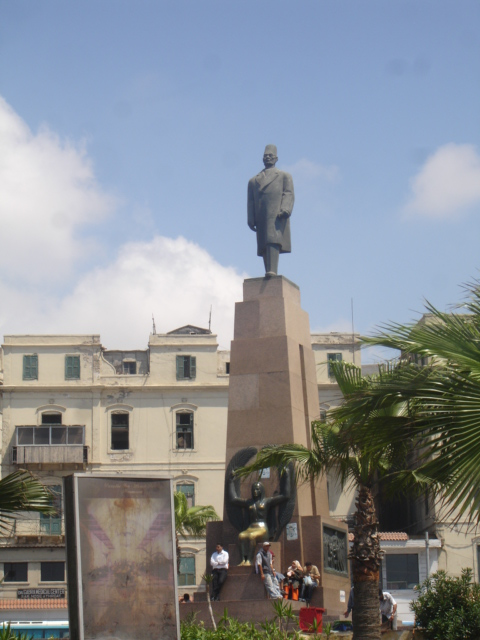
The Saad Zaghloul Pasha statue in Alexandria, built over the Caesareum site.

== See also ==
- 1st century BC in architecture
- Ancient Egyptian architecture
- History of Alexandria
