= Hungerford Bridge and Golden Jubilee Bridges =

Bridges in London, England

Hungerford Bridge
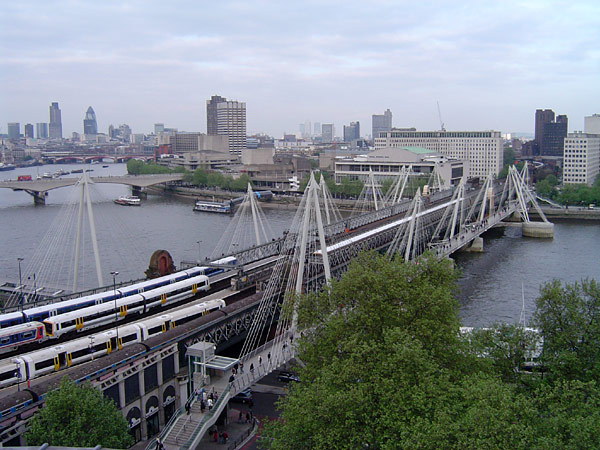
- Hungerford Bridge and Golden Jubilee Bridges, seen from the north
- Coordinates: 51°30′22″N 0°07′12″W
- Carries: South Eastern Main Line (Hungerford Bridge); Pedestrians (Golden Jubilee Bridges)
- Crosses: River Thames
- Locale: London
- Maintained by: Network Rail
- Preceded by: Westminster Bridge
- Followed by: Waterloo Bridge

Characteristics
- Design: Steel truss (Hungerford Bridge) Cable-stayed bridge (Golden Jubilee Bridges)

History
- Opened: 1864 (Hungerford Bridge); 2002 (Golden Jubilee Bridges)

Location
- Interactive map of Hungerford Bridge

Audio description of the bridges by Sophie Thompson

The Hungerford Bridge crosses the River Thames in London, and lies between Waterloo Bridge and Westminster Bridge. Owned by Network Rail Infrastructure Ltd (who use its official name of Charing Cross Bridge) it is a steel truss railway bridge flanked by two more recent, cable-stayed, pedestrian bridges that share the railway bridge's foundation piers, and which are named the Golden Jubilee Bridges.

The north end of the bridge is Charing Cross railway station, and is near Embankment Pier and the Victoria Embankment. The south end is near Waterloo station, County Hall, the Royal Festival Hall, and the London Eye. Each pedestrian bridge has steps and lift access.

== History ==
Hungerford Market Foot Bridge Act 1836
- Act of Parliament
- Parliament of the United Kingdom
- Long title: An Act for building a Foot Bridge over the River Thames from Hungerford Market in the Parish of Saint Martin in the Fields in the County of Middlesex to the opposite Shore in the Parish of Lambeth in the County of Surrey, and for making suitable Approaches thereto.
- Citation: 6 & 7 Will. 4. c. cxxxiii

Dates
- Royal assent: 13 August 1836

Text of statute as originally enacted

Hungerford and Lambeth Suspension Foot Bridge Company Act 1843
- Act of Parliament
- Parliament of the United Kingdom
- Long title: An Act to amend an Act relating to the building of the Hungerford and Lambeth Suspension Foot Bridge; and for granting further Powers to the Hungerford and Lambeth Suspension Foot Bridge Company.
- Citation: 6 & 7 Vict. c. xix

Dates
- Royal assent: 9 May 1843

Text of statute as originally enacted

Charing Cross Bridge Act 1845
- Act of Parliament
- Parliament of the United Kingdom
- Long title: An Act to amend the Acts relating to the Hungerford and Lambeth Suspension Foot Bridge Company, hereafter to be called "The Charing Cross Bridge Company," and for granting further Powers to the said Company.
- Citation: 8 & 9 Vict. c. lxii

Dates
- Royal assent: 30 June 1845

Charing Cross Bridge Approaches Act 1849
- Act of Parliament
- Parliament of the United Kingdom
- Long title: An Act for improving the Approaches to the Charing Cross Bridge on the Surrey Side thereof, and for amending the Acts relating thereto; for authorizing the raising of a farther Sum of Money, and for other Purposes.
- Citation: 12 & 13 Vict. c. li

Dates
- Royal assent: 13 July 1849

Text of statute as originally enacted

Charing Cross Bridge Act 1851
- Act of Parliament
- Parliament of the United Kingdom
- Long title: An Act to enable the Charing Cross Bridge Company to raise further Monies; to amend the Acts relating to the Company; and for other Purposes.
- Citation: 14 & 15 Vict. c. cxliv

Dates
- Royal assent: 7 August 1851

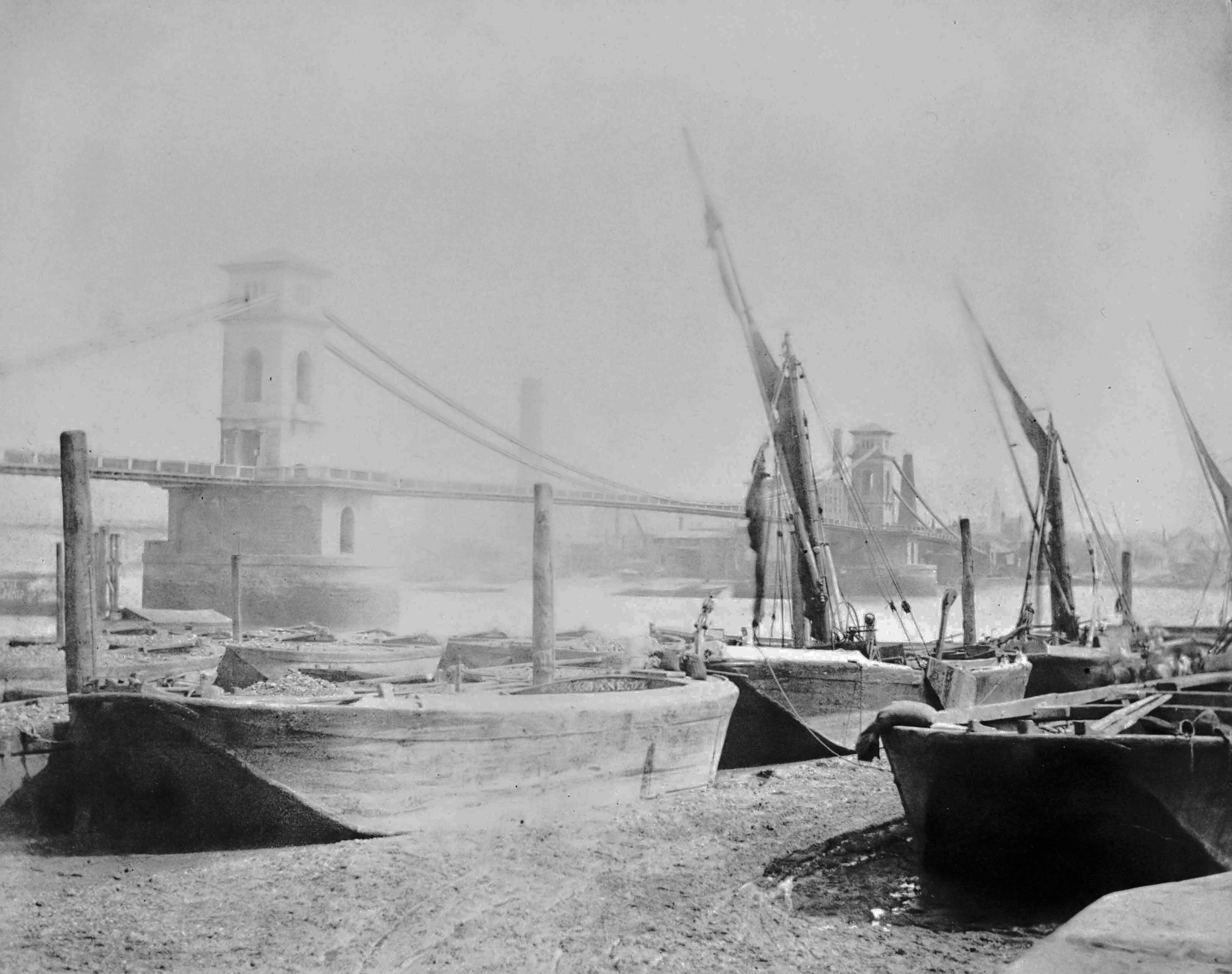
c. 1845 photograph of the bridge by Fox Talbot

The first Hungerford Bridge was authorised by the Hungerford Market Foot Bridge Act 1836 (6 & 7 Will. 4. c. cxxxiii). Built by the Hungerford and Lambeth Suspension Foot Bridge Company, it was designed by Isambard Kingdom Brunel, opened in 1845 as a suspension footbridge. It was named after the then Hungerford Market, because it went from the South Bank, specifically a northern point of Lambeth, soon close to London Waterloo station to that place on the north side of the Thames, specifically to the market (later Charing Cross Station) about 200 yards or metres east of Trafalgar Square partly in the parish of Saint Martin in the Fields, Westminster, the spire of which can be seen from the bridge.

Hungerford Market and Charing Cross Bridge Act 1860
- Act of Parliament
- Parliament of the United Kingdom
- Long title: An Act for the Transfer of the remaining Property of the Hungerford Market Company and the Charing Cross Bridge Company respectively to the Charing Cross Railway Company, and for the winding up of the Affairs and the Dissolution of the Hungerford Market Company and the Charing Cross Bridge Company respectively, and for other Purposes.
- Citation: 23 & 24 Vict. c. cxlvii

Dates
- Royal assent: 23 July 1860

In 1859 the original bridge was bought by the Charing Cross Railway Company, who obtained the Hungerford Market and Charing Cross Bridge Act 1860 (23 & 24 Vict. c. cxlvii) to allow them to extend the South Eastern Railway into a new Charing Cross railway station. The railway company replaced the suspension bridge with a structure designed by Sir John Hawkshaw, comprising nine spans made of wrought iron lattice girders, which opened in 1864. The chains from the old bridge were re-used in Bristol's Clifton Suspension Bridge. The original brick pile buttresses of Brunel's footbridge are still in use, though the one on the Charing Cross side is now much closer to the river bank than it was originally, due to the building of the Victoria Embankment, completed in 1870. The buttress on the South Bank side still has the entrances and steps from the original steamer pier Brunel built on to the footbridge.

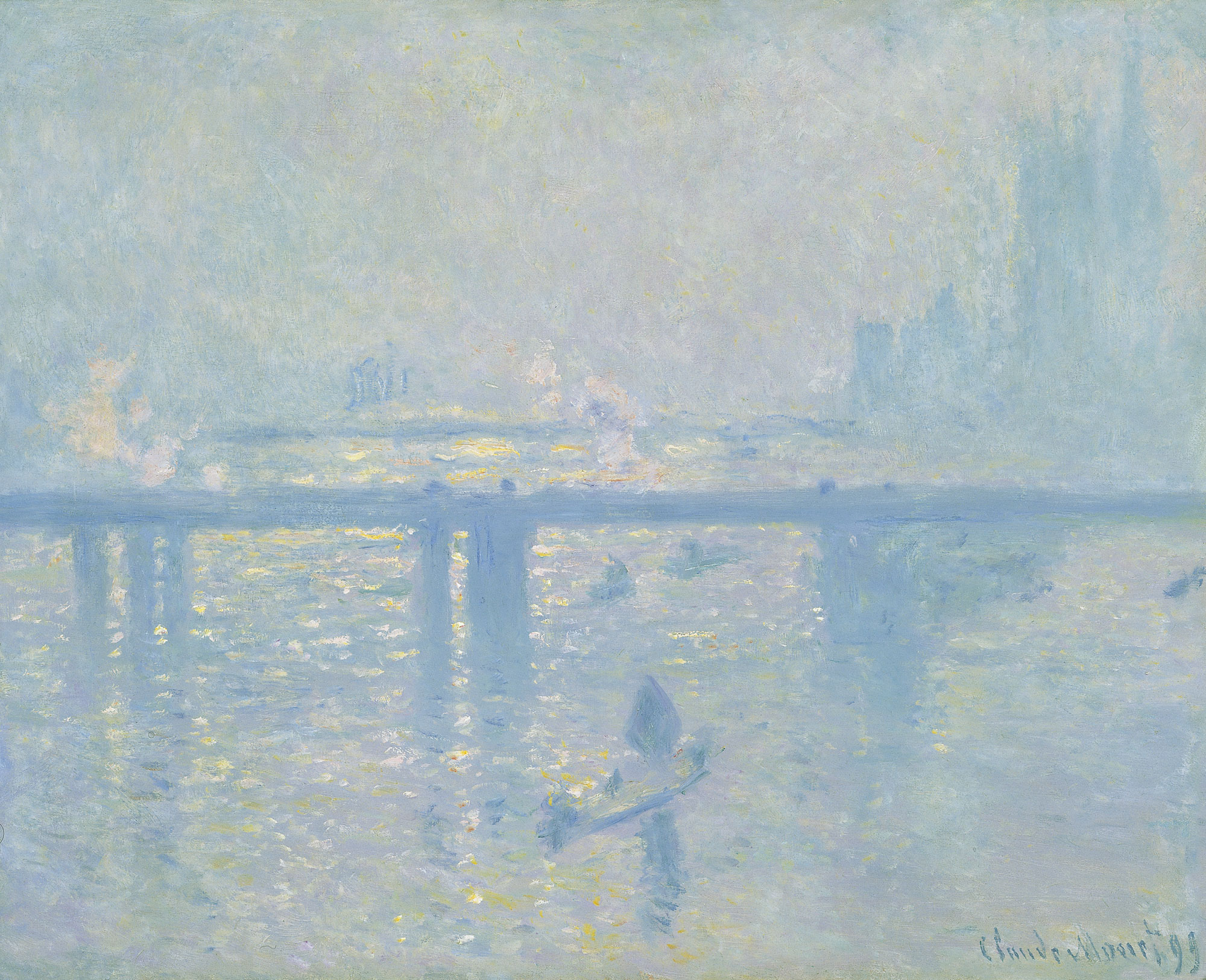
Claude Monet oil painting, 1899, one of 37 versions from his Charing Cross Bridge series

Victoria Embankment by C.R.W. Nevinson, 1924, showing trains running across the bridge

To compensate for the removal of the footbridge, walkways were added on each side, with the western one later being removed when the railway was widened. Another walkway was temporarily added in 1951 when an Army Bailey bridge was constructed for the Festival of Britain. In 1980 a temporary walkway was erected on the western side while the eastern railway bridge and walkway were refurbished. It is one of three bridges in London to carry pedestrians and rolling stock; the others being Fulham Railway Bridge and Barnes Bridge.

The footbridge gained a reputation for being narrow, dilapidated and dangerous; it was the scene of a murder in June 1999. In the mid-1990s a decision was made to replace the footbridge with new structures on either side of the existing railway bridge, and a competition was held in 1996 for a new design.

Further justification for new footbridge structures on the west flank and east flank was that the brittle wrought iron support pillars of Sir John Hawkshaw's railway bridge were vulnerable to impact from riverboats. It was felt, especially following the Marchioness disaster, that these should be clad in concrete at water level; but the bridge's owners, Railtrack, could not afford the work. The Golden Jubilee Bridges achieved this protection at no cost to Railtrack.

=== 2025 refurbishment ===
In January 2025, a three-year project to refurbish Hungerford Bridge began. All the original metalwork will be retained and refurbished; engineers will test the truss pins – which join the supports together – and replace the pin end caps on the girders.

== The Golden Jubilee footbridges ==
The concept design for the new footbridges was won by architects Lifschutz Davidson Sandilands and engineers WSP Group. Detailed design of the two bridges was carried out by consulting engineers Gifford, now Ramboll UK. The steelwork for the new footbridges was fabricated by Butterley Engineering Ltd. of Ripley, Derbyshire.

Their construction was complicated by the need to keep the railway bridge operating without interruptions, the Bakerloo line tunnels passing only a few feet under the river bed, and the potential danger of unexploded World War II bombs in the Thames mud. Despite extensive surveys of the riverbed, London Underground was unwilling to accept these risks and preliminary works were stopped in 2000. The design was modified so that the support structure on the north side, which would have been within 15 m (49 ft) of the tube lines, was moved out of the river bed and onto Victoria Embankment. Excavation near the tube lines was carried out when the tube was closed, and foundations were hand-dug for additional security.

The two new 4-metre (13 ft) wide footbridges were completed in 2002. They were named the Golden Jubilee Bridges, in honour of the Golden Jubilee of Elizabeth II, although in practice they are often still referred to as the "Hungerford Footbridges".

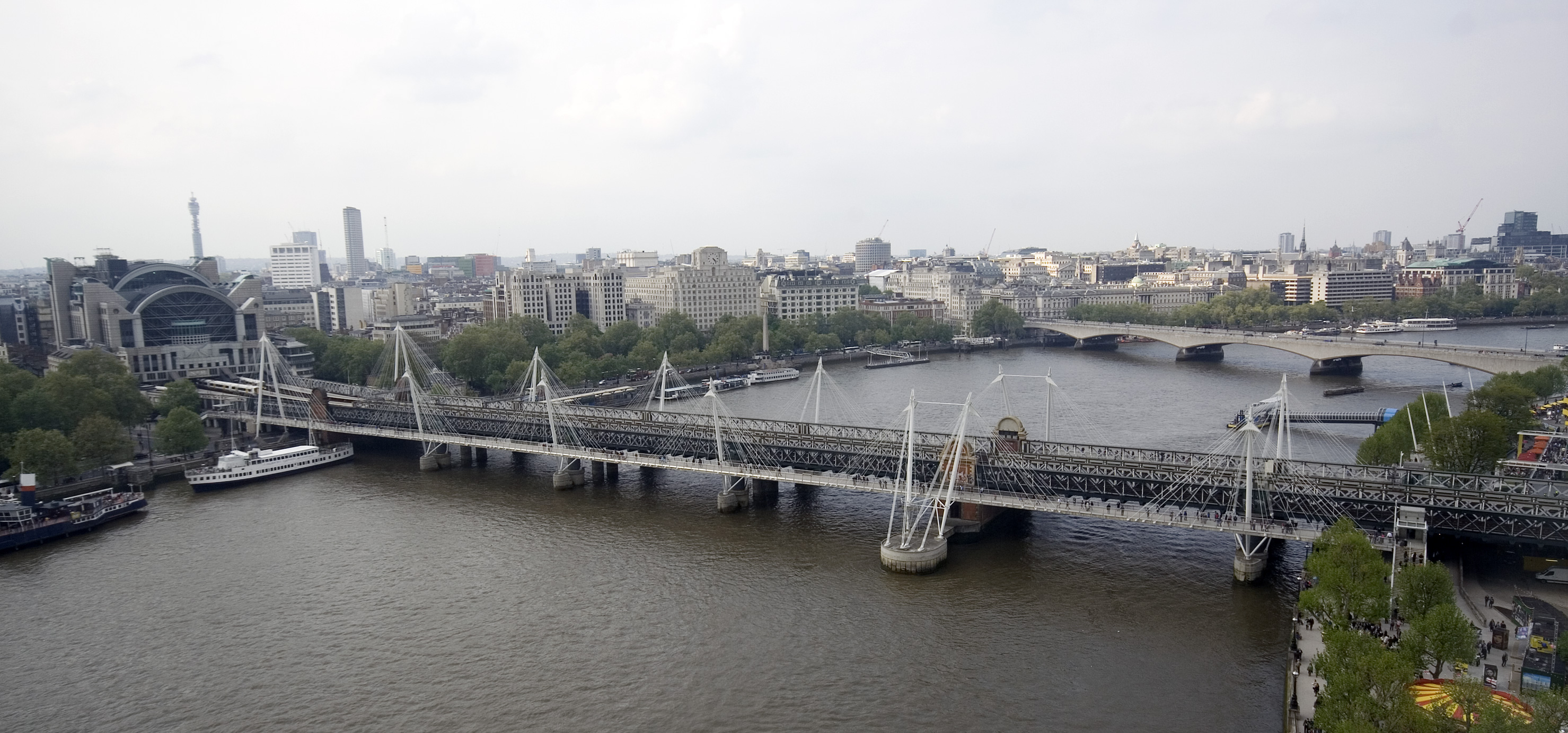
The Hungerford and Golden Jubilee bridges as seen from the London Eye, with Waterloo Bridge in the background

The 300 m (980 ft) long decks were raised using an innovative method called incremental launching, in which each 50 m (160 ft) long section was pulled across the river using a 250 m (820 ft) long steel truss weighing 300 tonnes. This process was repeated five times until each deck spanned the river, supported by six temporary piers made of steel and concrete. The seven 25-tonne pylons were then raised over the subsequent two weeks. Once the pylons had been installed, the decks were jacked up to enable their connection with the cable stays suspended from the pylons. The concrete deck was then lowered into its final position and the temporary piers and supports were dismantled.

The design of the bridges is complex. Each of the two decks is supported by inclined outward-leaning pylons. The decks are suspended from fans of slender steel rods called deck stays—there are 180 on each deck, made up of over 4 km (2.5 mi) of cable—and are held in position by other rods called backstays. Because the pylons lean the back stays are under tension. The deck is secured in place by steel collars fitted around (although not supported by) the pillars of the railway bridge; the collars are themselves attached to the bridge's foundations by tie-down rods. The entire structure is thus held in place by exploiting the tensions between the pylons and the various stay rods and struts.

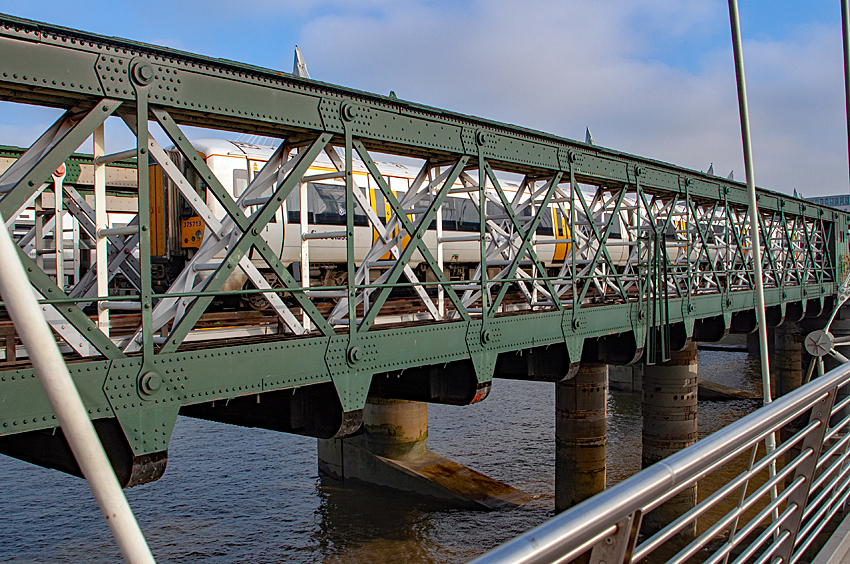
Class 375 EMU on Hungerford Bridge viewed from the upstream Jubilee Bridge

The new bridges won the Specialist category in the Royal Fine Art Commission Building of the Year Award in 2003. It gained a Structural Achievement Award commendation in the 2004 Institution of Structural Engineers awards, and has won awards from the Civic Trust and for its lighting design.

In 2014, the planning application for the now cancelled Garden Bridge, revealed in its assessment of pedestrian movement across the Thames that the footbridges are the busiest in London, with an estimated footfall of 8.5 million each year.

== In fiction ==
- "Hungerford Bridge" by Elizabeth Hand, Conjunctions 52, 2009.
- "The Woman Who Fell In Love With The Hungerford Bridge" by Lavie Tidhar, Ambit 2014.

== See also ==
- List of crossings of the River Thames
- List of bridges in London
- Charing Cross Bridge (Monet series)
