= Carlo Mancini =

Italian painter (1829–1910)

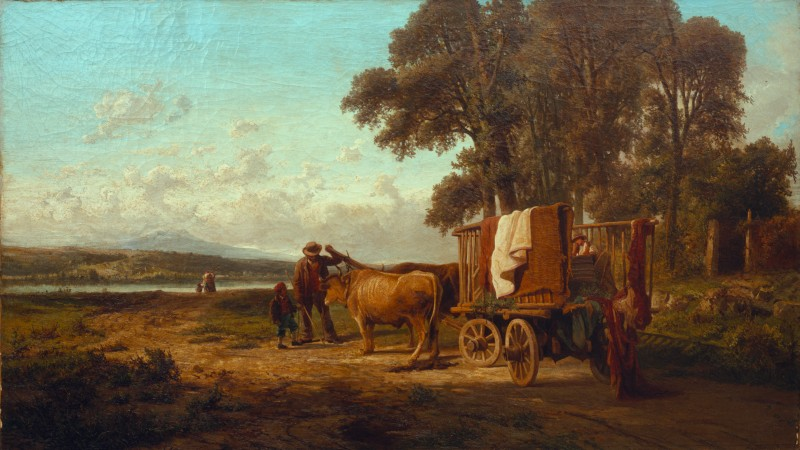
Buoi aggiogati al carro sulle rive del Lago di Annone, 1857 (Art collections of Fondazione Cariplo)

Carlo Mancini (Milan, 1829–1910) was an Italian painter noted for his rural scenes and Oriental subjects.

== Biography ==
Born into a Milanese family of ancient and noble lineage, Carlo Mancini grew up in a liberal cultural climate and mixed with some of the leading figures in Milan’s musical world. Regular guests in the family villa at Merate, included: Gioachino Rossini, Gaetano Donizetti and Giuseppe Verdi as well as Arrigo Boito, with whom he formed a close friendship.

It was probably the landscape painter Rinaldo Barbiano di Belgioso, an uncle on his mother’s side, who first interested him in painting. Given that the only evidence of his studies under the guidance of Giuseppe Bisi, then holder of the chair in landscape at the Brera Academy, is an end-of-course exam work of the mid-1850s (1857) and that his name appears on no official academic documents, it has recently been suggested that his pictorial apprenticeship took place outside the institution. At the culmination of his studies, in 1857, he exhibited Winter Morning at the International Exhibition in Paris.

A trip in Brittany and Normandy led to early contact with English landscape painting and steered Mancini’s artistic interests towards faithful depiction from life but attenuated by late-Romantic overtones in the handling of light. Until he stopped showing work at exhibitions in 1875, he focused on rural subjects, mostly drawn from the countryside in Brianza and from memories of his youthful stay in Normandy, which were favourably reviewed by critics and won him some marks of official recognition. In his later career, he visited Egypt, Arabia, India, Burma and China and brought home hundreds of sketches which he kept in a locked, iron chest until his death. In 1929, these sketches were donated to the Galleria Moderna d'Arte. From the 1870s, following his trip to the Far-East and Middle-East, his work included more Oriental subject matter.

== Work ==
Mancini worked primarily in watercolour, however he occasionally worked in oil.

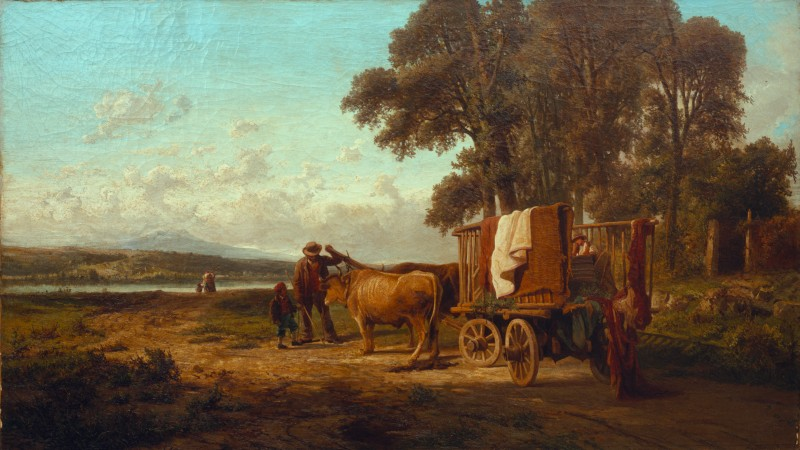
Buoi Aggiogati al Carro Sulle Rive del Lago di Annone, 1857

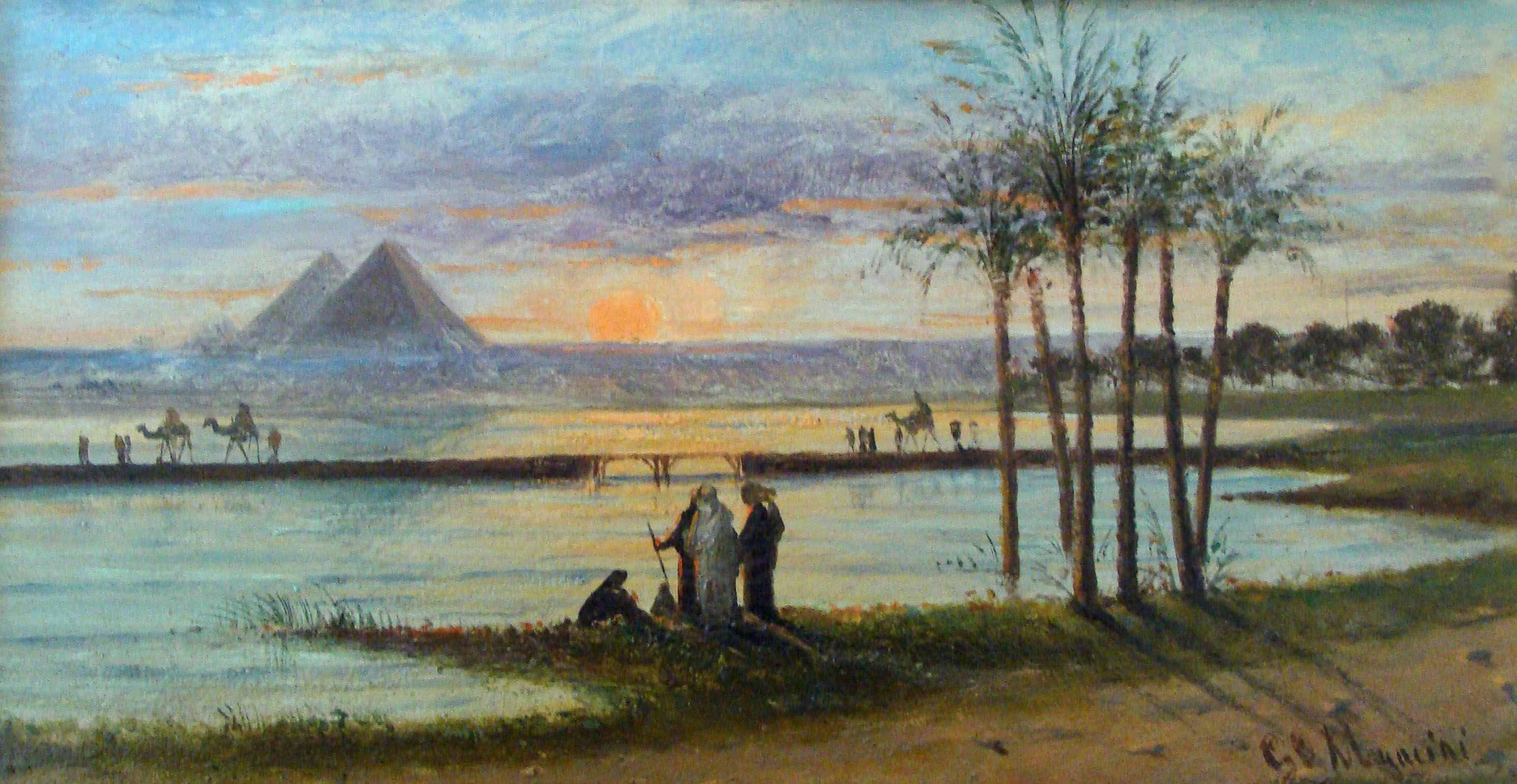
Coucher de Soleil sur les Pyramides d'Egypte, 1875

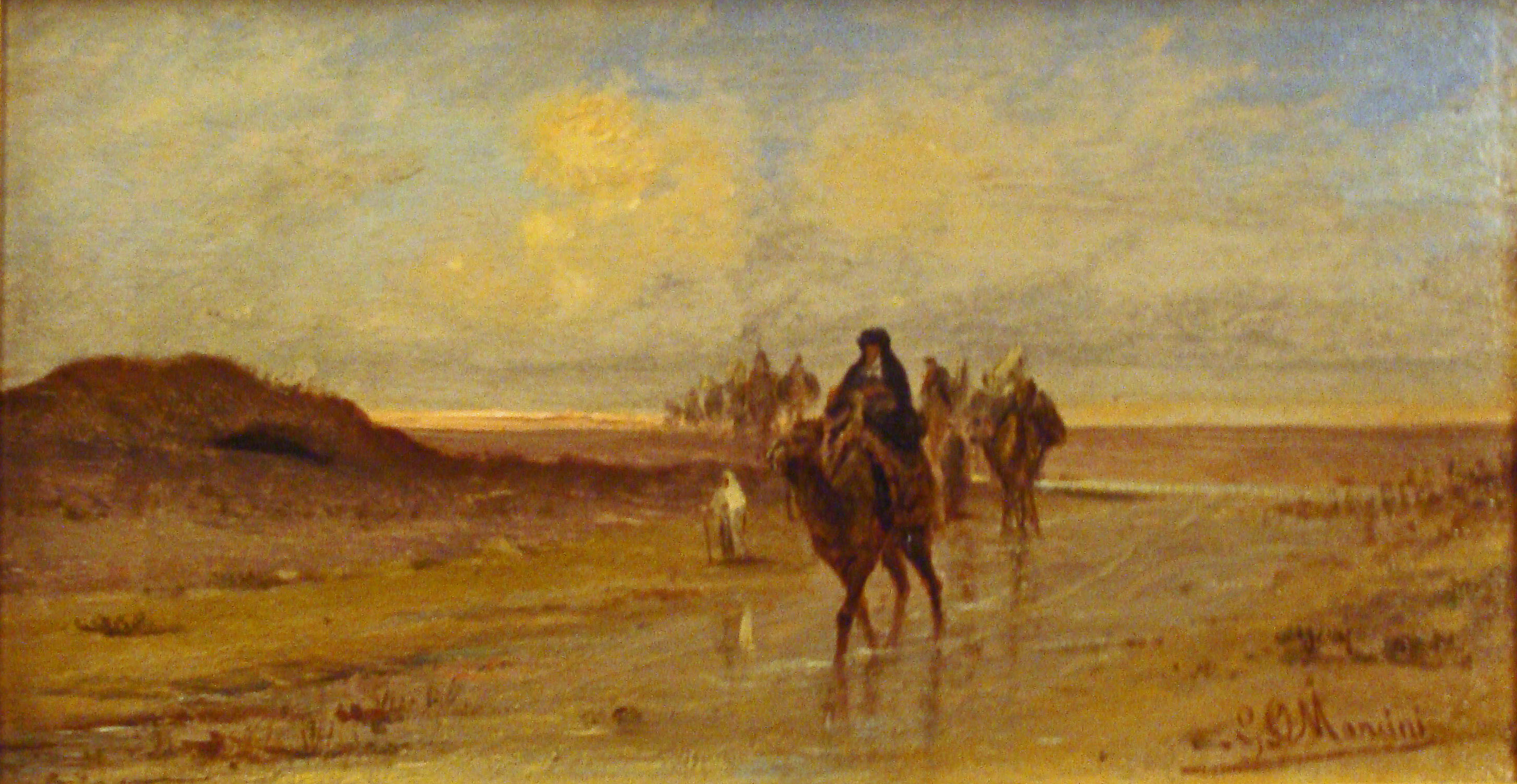
le Désert d'Egypte

=== Select list of works ===
- November
- Sunset over Po
- Lombard Plains
- Luogo Solitario
- In Valle Brentano
- On the shores of the Brenta.

== See also ==
- List of Orientalist artists
- Orientalism

== Bibliography ==
- Elena Lissoni, Carlo Mancini, online catalogue Artgate by Fondazione Cariplo, 2010, CC BY-SA (source for the first revision of this article).

== Other projects ==
Media related to Carlo Mancini at Wikimedia Commons
