= Elbert E. Farman =

American diplomat (1831–1911)

Elbert Eli Farman, Sr. (April 23, 1831 – December 30, 1911) was an American diplomat. He served as United States consul general in Egypt and a judge in the international commission that responded to the bombardment of Alexandria. In the United States, he is best known for his role in arranging the gift of the Cleopatra's Needle, now in New York, from Isma'il Pasha of Egypt to the United States.

== Life and career ==
Farman was born in New Haven, Connecticut. After graduating from Amherst College, he studied international law in Berlin and Heidelberg. After serving as the district attorney in Wyoming County, New York, Farman was appointed consul general in Cairo in 1876 and served until 1881. He then served on two international tribunals in Egypt; the first helped revise Egyptian judicial codes. The second, established in 1883, judged claims by citizens of Alexandria regarding damages from the British bombardment of the city. The commission awarded more than $20,000,000 ($717 million in 2025) to Egyptians affected by the British attacks.

Farman's most visible contribution is the 15th century, B.C.E., obelisk that currently stands in Central Park, New York. He described his role in its acquisition in detail in his book Egypt and its Betrayal. His involvement began in 1877, when he received a diplomatic letter including a proposal to be put to Isma'il Pasha of Egypt. By his own account, the acquisition was nearly a single-handed effort, however, after the US State Department appeared to have lost interest. After considerable setbacks, he concluded negotiations in 1879. The obelisk arrived in New York two years later.

During his time in Egypt, Farman amassed a considerable collection of Egyptian antiquities, much of which was sold to the Metropolitan Museum of Art in 1890. His specialty was Hadra vases.

== Writings ==
Farman published two books about Egypt in his retirement. Along the Nile with General Grant (1904) was praised as a "singularly pleasing volume" that contains "admirable work on Egyptology." Egypt and its Betrayal (1908) contains a condemnation of England's attempt to acquire "a New Empire" and the "deceptive" journalism that supported English claims to have modernized the country. As a contemporary review noted, Farman showed that many of the accomplishments that had been attributed through "gross misstatement of facts" to the British controller-general of Egypt, Evelyn Baring, 1st Earl of Cromer, were actually "planned and carried out by his predecessors, the native Egyptian rulers." His final work was a thorough genealogy of his family.

== Personal life ==
Farman married Adelaide Frisbie in 1883. The Farmans had two children, Lois and Elbert, Jr., and, through Lois, one grandchild, Robert C. Richardson 3rd.
