= Obelisk ship =

Ships used to transport obelisks

Ships were used during the Eighteenth Dynasty of ancient Egypt to transport obelisks from the quarry to their destination. Fifteen centuries later, the Romans used ships to transport obelisks across the Mediterranean to Rome. Today, eight ancient Egyptian obelisks stand in Rome, though not in their original places. The first of the obelisks, the 263-ton Flaminian obelisk, was transported from Heliopolis – modern-day Cairo – in 10 BCE. while the last, the 500-ton Lateran obelisk, was transported from Karnak.

== Ancient Egypt ==
The earliest obelisk ships were built in Ancient Egypt to transport obelisks via the Nile from the quarries to their destination.

During the reign of Thutmose I, Ineni was granted superintendence of the king's building projects, which included the erection of two obelisks. A surviving text fragment documents that the obelisk ship had a length of ~63 metres (207 ft) and a width of ~21 metres (69 ft).

I (Ineni) inspected the erection of two obelisks ... built the august boat of 120 cubits in its length, 40 cubits in its width, in order to transport these obelisks. (They) came in peace, safety and prosperity, and landed at Karnak ... of the city. Its 'track' was laid with every pleasant wood.

A relief depicting Hatshepsut's barge loaded with two obelisks on its way to the great temple of Amun at Karnak was found in the Mortuary Temple of Hatshepsut at Deir el-Bahari.

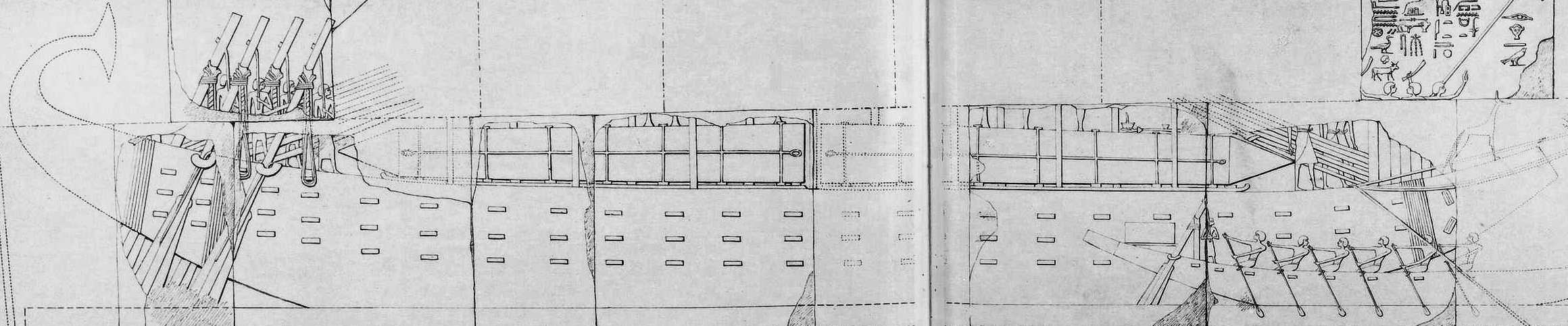
Obelisk ship of Hatshepsut, carrying two obelisks

In the 19th dynasty, Seti I commissioned numerous works, including multiple obelisks, and large barges to transport them. A rock stela at Aswan states:

His Majesty has ordered the commissioning of multitudinous works for the making of very great obelisks and great and wondrous statues in the name of His Majesty. He made great barges for transporting them, and ships crews to match them (for) ferrying them from the quarry while the officials and transport-men hastened and his eldest son was before them doing what is beneficial for His Majesty.

== Ancient Rome ==
During the Roman Empire ships were constructed to transport obelisks from Egypt across the Mediterranean to Rome and Constantinople (modern Istanbul). Pliny the Elder (23–79 CE) and Ammianus Marcellinus (330–393 CE) give accounts of how obelisks were brought to Rome.

=== Loading of ships ===
Pliny the Elder described how an obelisk was loaded onto a ship.

For this purpose, a canal was dug from the river Nile to the spot where the obelisk lay; and two broad vessels, laden with blocks of similar stone a foot square, the cargo of each amounting to double the size, and consequently double the weight, of the obelisk, were brought beneath it; the extremities of the obelisk remaining supported by the opposite sides of the canal. The blocks of stone were then removed, and the vessels, being thus gradually lightened, received their burden.

=== Destruction of ships ===
There is little evidence of the great ships that carried the large obelisks across the Mediterranean. One of the two ships that carried the Vatican obelisk was purposely sunk by the emperor Claudius to build the Portus harbor; the other burned down during Caligula’s reign (36–41 CE) while on display at the Puteoli harbor.

=== Naval architecture ===
Three Roman ships were built to transport one obelisk. The two aft ships were of rectangular shape; they were 37 meters in length and 5 meters in width. The two ships were held together by longitudinal beams, while the obelisk was tied to these longitudinal beams and held stationary underwater. The third ship, a larger trireme, was in the front and was tied to the two larger ships carrying the obelisk. The third ship’s purpose was to help steer the two aft ships and have rowers and sail power the ship across the Mediterranean.

== Modernity ==
=== Cleopatra's Needles ===
Until the second half of the 19th century two obelisks were located at the Caesareum of Alexandria, now known as Cleopatra's Needles. The fallen one was taken to London by the cylinder ship Cleopatra in 1877. Four years later, the standing one was loaded onto the SS Dessoug and shipped to New York City.

== See also ==
- List of obelisks in Rome
- Ships of ancient Rome

== Bibliography ==
- Brand, Peter J. (1997). "The 'Lost' Obelisks and Colossi of Seti I". Journal of the American Research Center in Egypt. 34: 101–114. doi:10.2307/40000801. JSTOR 40000801.
- Breasted, James Henry (1906). Ancient records of Egypt. Vol. 2. Chicago: The University of Chicago Press.
- Gorringe, Henry Honychurch (1882). Egyptian Obelisks. Nineteenth Century Collections Online (NCCO): Photography: The World through the Lens. John C. Nimmo.
- Landström, Björn (1970). Ships of the Pharaohs: 4000 years of Egyptian Shipbuilding. London: Doubleday. ISBN 978-0385078306.
- Marcellinus, Ammianus. Roman Antiquities. Vol. 17. pp. 319–329.
- Naville, Edouard (1908). The temple of Deir el Bahari (Band 6): The lower terrace, additions and plans. Vol. 6. London: Egypt Exploration Fund. doi:10.11588/DIGLIT.4147.
- Pliny the Elder (1855) [77 CE]. "14. Obelisks". The Natural History. Vol. 7, Book 36. Translated by Bostock, John; Riley, H.T. London: Taylor and Francis. OCLC 1377782773.
- Torr, Cecil (1895). Ancient Ships. Cambridge: University Press.
- Vinson, Steve (1994). Egyptian Boats and Ships (1st ed.). Buckinghamshire: Shire Publications. ISBN 0-7478-0222-X.
- Wirsching, Armin (2000). "How the Obelisks Reached Rome: Evidence of Roman Double-Ships". The International Journal of Nautical Archaeology. 29 (2): 273–283. doi:10.1111/j.1095-9270.2000.tb01456.x. S2CID 162710923.
- Wirsching, Armin (2003). "Supplementary Remarks on the Roman Obelisk-Ships". The International Journal of Nautical Archaeology. 32 (1): 121–123. doi:10.1111/j.1095-9270.2003.tb01438.x. S2CID 233246649.
- Wirsching, Armin (2013). Obelisken transportieren und aufrichten in Ägypten und in Rom (in German) (3rd ed.). Norderstedt: BoD. ISBN 978-3-8334-8513-8.
