= List of shipwrecks in the 1st millennium =

The list of shipwrecks in the 1st millennium includes some ships sunk, wrecked or otherwise lost between 1 January AD 1 and 31 December AD 1000, of the Julian calendar.

Year	Origin	Name	Type	Location	Incident	Notes
c. 100 BC to 100 AD	Roman		unknown	Near Fiscardo, Cephalonia in the Ionian Sea	Sank	The wreck could be carrying as many as 6000 amphorae.
c. 40	Roman		Obelisk ship	Puteoli harbour	Caught fire	Occurred while on display during Caligula’s reign (36 – 41 AD).
42	Roman		Floating palaces	Lake Nemi	Intentionally sunk	Occurred after the death of Caligula.
c. 50	Roman		Obelisk ship	Portus	Intentionally sunk	Sunk by the emperor Claudius to build Portus harbour.
c. 60	Roman	Madrague de Giens	Cargo ship	Off La Madrague de Giens, on the Giens Peninsula	Sank	Currently lies in 18 to 20 metres of water.
c. 280	Gallo-Roman		unknown	Harbour at Saint Peter Port, Guernsey	Sank	Discovered in 1982 by a local diver, raised 1984–1987 by the Guernsey Maritime Trust. Some of the ship is on show in a store with a viewing window, opposite Fort Grey. The remnants consist mainly of the forward parts of the hull, built of oak.
c. 320	Roman	Ses Fontanelles shipwreck	unknown	Just offshore near the Ses Fontanelles wetlands of Mallorca	Possibly stranded on a sandbar	Discovered in 2019, excavated in 2019, 2021 and 2022.
c. 570	Byzantine		unknown	Off the island of Ekinlik, in the Sea of Marmara	Sank	Was carrying marble columns and anchors. Found by sonar in 1997.
622	Dál Riata		Currach	Off Ireland	Sank	Conaing mac Áedáin, a member of the Dál Riata royal family, drowned with the wreck. S poem in the Annals of Ulster commemorates the event.
641	unknown		unknown	Iona, off Scotland	Shipwreck	Recorded by the monastic community of Iona.
c. 666	unknown	St Wilfrith	unknown	Sussex coast	Stranded	
737	Celtic		unknown	North Channel	Sank	Faílbe son of Guaire, coarb of the church at Apor Crosán (Applecross, Scotland), and 22 sailors were lost.
756	Dealbhna Nuadhat		30 (or 27) boats	Lough Ree, Ireland	Wrecked fleet (naufragium)	Only one survivor from the fleet.
c. 830	Arab	Belitung shipwreck	Dhow	Belitung, Sumatra	Wrecked	Was carrying valuable cargo from China to Africa, including ceramics from Changsha, spice jars, ewers, inkwells, funeral urns and gilt-silver boxes. Also known as the ″Tang shipwreck" or "Tang treasure ship″ and was discovered in 1998 by sea cucumber divers.
877	Danish fleet		120 galleys	Swanage	Lost due to storm or fog	Incident occurred following an agreement by the Danes with King Alfred to leave Wessex.
886	Danish fleet		Numerous war galleys	Mouth of the River Orwell	Sunk in battle	During clashes between King Alfred and the Danish Vikings.
924	Viking fleet		unknown	Dundrum	Wrecked	Around 900 lives lost.
