= Waynman Dixon =

British engineer

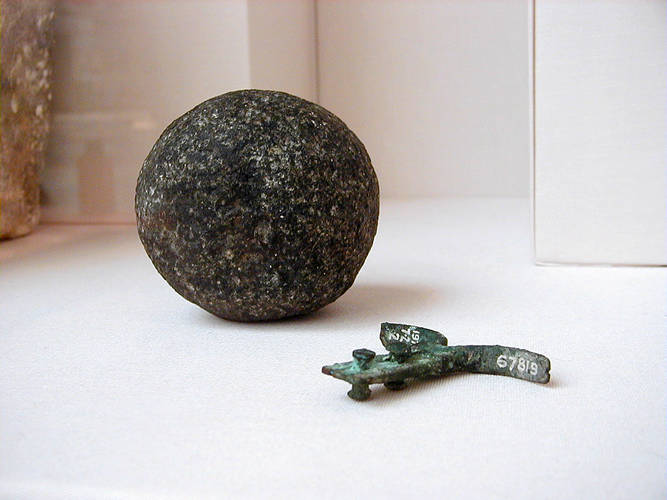
Two of the "Dixon Relics": a stone sphere and metal hook

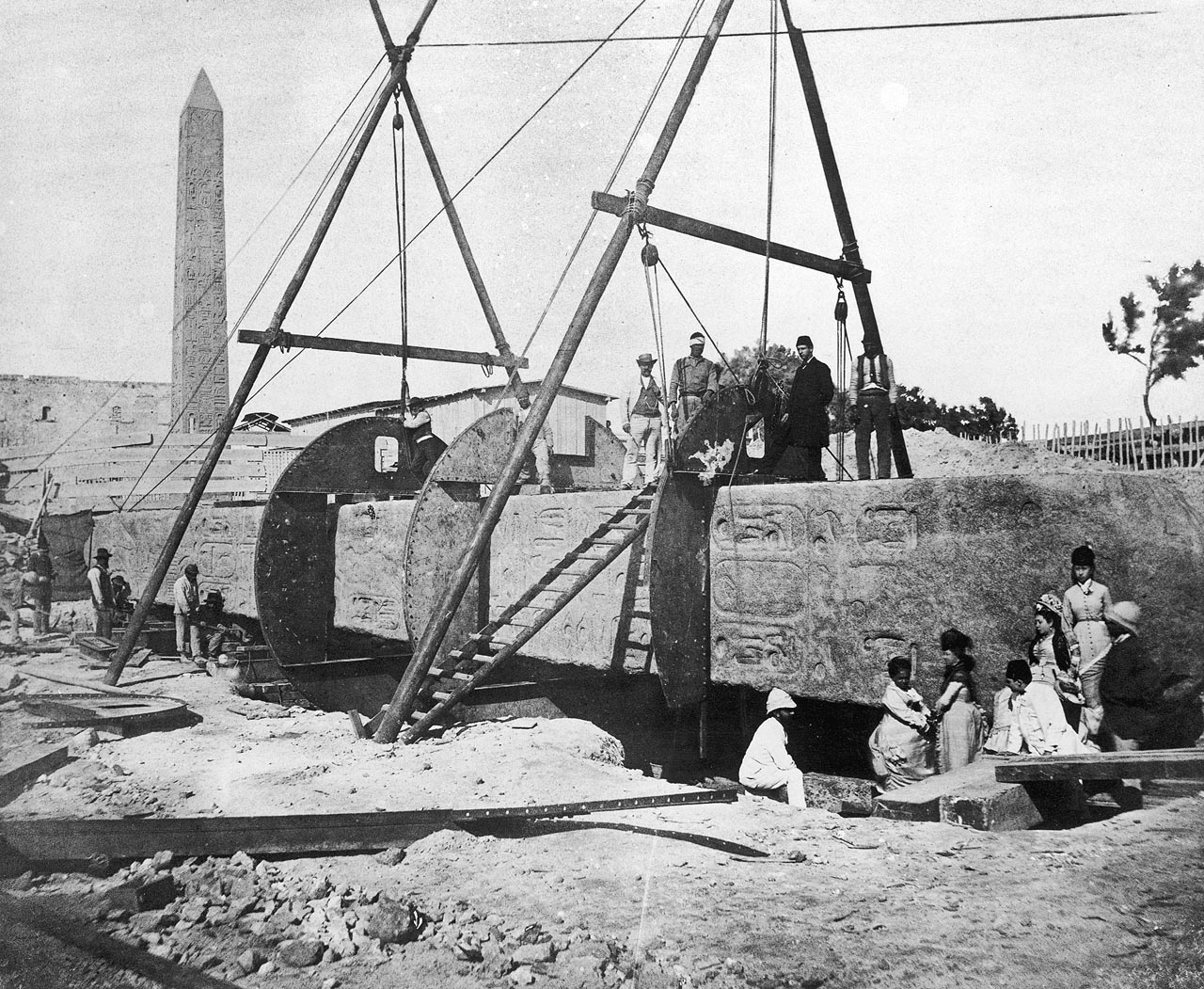
Construction of the cylinder around Cleopatra's Needle in 1877

Waynman Dixon (1844–1930) was a British engineer, known for his work on the Great Pyramid of Giza and for discovering the only Egyptian artefacts to be found inside that pyramid.

The three objects found in the Great Pyramid of Giza, the so-called "Dixon Relics", are tools: a small dolerite ball, a copper hook (both now in the British Museum in London), and a fragment of cedar wood in the Marischal Museum, Aberdeen. These relics were mostly forgotten after their discovery. He also discovered two shafts out from the Queen's Chamber of the Great Pyramid, similar to those that connect the King's Chamber to the outside wall of the pyramid, although these don't extend all the way.

Outside of his interest in Egypt, he worked as a manager of Sir Raylton Dixon & Co, a Cleveland-based shipbuilding company, alongside his brothers in Middlesbrough: he retired from the board of the company in 1917. He also served as an honorary consul of Japan in later life. One brother, John Dixon (1835–1891), designed the cylinder that transported Cleopatra's Needle from Egypt to London, and Waynman himself was tasked with building it around the obelisk. The other brother, Sir Raylton Dixon, was also an engineer and shipbuilder, and served as Mayor of Middlesbrough.

== Discoveries within Khufu's Pyramid ==
While excavating within Khufu's pyramid in 1872, Dixon's team found two symmetrical, sealed shafts within the second chamber of the pyramid. This venture in the second chamber was based on Dixon's speculation that there would be shafts there similar to the ones already discovered in the first chamber. However, these shafts were sealed from their inside, leading Dixon to conclude that they could not have served a practical purpose in construction. Dixon hired a man to pierce the seals with a chisel, and in both, the man lost his chisel in the shaft.

In 1872, Dixon discovered a casing (exterior) stone while the Egyptian government was removing detached rubble for road work. It was the most complete specimen of a casing stone that had been found up to that point. It was identified as a stone from Khufu's pyramid due to its ascending angle very closely matching that of the pyramid.

In 1879, Dixon took measurements of the sarcophagus in the King's chamber which revealed that some of its material had broken off since it was last measured in 1865.

=== Dixon Relics ===
The "Dixon Relics" refers to a set of three objects discovered within Khufu's pyramid by Dixon and James Grant: a copper hook, a dolerite ball, and several pieces of cedar wood. The hook and ball are currently housed in the British Museum. All three relics were quickly forgotten and/or lost after their discovery. The pieces of wood were originally taken by Grant, and then donated to the University of Aberdeen in 1946, where they were not classified, and were lost in the university's collection. In 2019, they were rediscovered by Egyptian archaeologist Abeer Eladany, and subsequently carbon-dated, with an estimated date of creation between 3341 and 3094 BCE, 500 years before the reign of Khufu.

In 1880, Charles Piazzi Smyth wrote of the Dixon relics: "The ball and hook are supposed to be dropped down the channels unintentionally." Modern theories have proposed that the artifacts were part of a measuring device or offerings for the Pharaoh.

== Cleopatra's Needle ==
Along with his brother, John, Dixon suggested that the obelisk known as Cleopatra's Needle be removed from Egypt and brought back to England. Using a vessel designed by Benjamin Baker, they maneuvered the obelisk down the Nile to Alexandria. The boat was temporarily abandoned during a storm, but it was eventually towed to England after stopping at Ferrol. Once in England, the obelisk was erected in London along the Thames. The whole process took 18 months.

== Late life and death ==
Later in his life, Dixon became active in emergency service organizations such as the St. John Ambulance Association. There, he advocated from the education of the populace of mining and manufacturing villages in first aid due to the "scarcity of doctors and hospitals" in those areas. In his advocacy for such education, he cited its inexpensiveness and the "finer traits of character and intelligent sympathy for suffering" it would promote.

In 1924, Dixon advocated for the further exploration of Khufu's pyramid, suggesting the drilling of holes in the pyramid as a means of further investigation, saying that this method of exploration could be done for a "very moderate cost."

Dixon died on January 24, 1930 in Great Ayton.

== Honours ==
In 1896, Dixon was appointed a Knight of Grace of the Venerable Order of St John (KStJ). He was awarded the Service Medal of the Order of St John in 1900. In 1922, he was awarded the Order of the Sacred Treasure (Third Class) by the Emperor of Japan.
