= SS Dessoug =

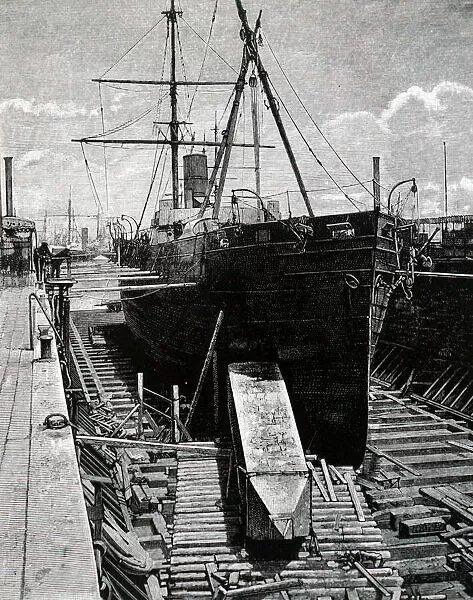
- Placing the Obelisk in the Hold of the Steamer Dessoug.

History
- Name: Denton (1864-1880); SS Dessoug (1880-1896)
- Owner: Khedive of Egypt (1864-1880); Ocean Steam Company (1880-1896)
- Operator: Khedive of Egypt (1864-1880); Ocean Steam Company (1880-1896)
- Port of registry: Egypt (1864-1880); (United States) USA (1880-1896)
- Builder: Hartlepool England
- Launched: 1864
- Fate: Broken up, August 1896

General characteristics
- Tonnage: 1,367 GRT
- Length: 233 ft 0 in (71 m)
- Beam: 33 ft 0 in (10 m)
- Depth: 23 ft (7 m)

SS Dessoug was a 1,367 GRT wooden cargo ship that was built in 1864 for the Khedive of Egypt as Denton. She was noteworthy for being selected by Henry Honychurch Gorringe for the purpose of transporting Cleopatra's Needle Obelisk from Egypt to New York City. She was sold to Ocean Steam Company in 1880 and renamed Dessoug. She served between New York and Savannah for her final years. In 1896 she sailed to Cow Bay, Long Island and was broken up for scrap.

== History ==
Denton was built in Hartlepool England in 1864 for the Khedive of Egypt.

She was selected by Henry Honychurch Gorringe for the purpose of transporting Cleopatra's Needle Obelisk from Egypt to New York City. Realizing that lifting a roughly 200-ton stone and placing it down into the cargo hold was beyond the technology of the day (and placing it as top-heavy deck cargo would capsize the ship), Gorringe devised a novel loading method. He had the ship moved to a sturdy dry dock. Then, he had a 30-foot-long (9.1 m) by 12-foot-tall (3.7 m) hole cut in her starboard bow – and the obelisk would be slid along horizontally right into the ship's interior. Cannonballs were used as bearings to move the obelisk inside. Thus loaded and the bow planks replaced, she left on 12 June 1880 for the United States. During the voyage her propeller shaft broke and was replaced using a spare while she was under sail power 1,300 miles (2,100 km) from shore. (The obelisk in London also called Cleopatra's Needle was of similar weight; it was shipped in a purpose-built temporary vessel, the Cleopatra.)

She was later used between New York and Savannah until she was scrapped in 1896.

== See also ==
- Cleopatra (cylinder ship)
- Cleopatra's Needle (London)
- Egyptian obelisks (including others moved out of Egypt)
