= James Grant Bey =

Scottish physician and antiquarian

James Sandilands Grant (Bey)
- James Grant.
- Born: 14/10/1840; Methlick, Scotland
- Died: 28/07/1896 (age 55); Bridge of Allan, Stirlingshire, Scotland
- Citizenship: United Kingdom
- Education: University of Aberdeen
- Known for: Aiding the Egyptian government during a Cholera outbreak Discovering artefacts in the Great Pyramid of Giza
- Scientific career
- Fields: Public medicine; Egyptology
- Workplaces: University of Aberdeen, the Egyptian health service

James Andrew Sandilands Grant (Bey) (1840–1896) was a Scottish physician and antiquarian. He was educated as a doctor of medicine at the University of Aberdeen in Scotland and then spent several years working in Egypt combatting outbreaks of cholera and working as a general practitioner. While he was there, he became well informed about the antiquities and culture of ancient Egypt and he went on to develop expertise in that field. He bequeathed a collection of his antiquities to the museum of the University of Aberdeen.

== Early life and education ==
He received his early education at Methlick Parish school in Aberdeenshire, Scotland, which he left in 1856. In 1857 he went up to the University of Aberdeen to study medicine, graduating with an M.A. in 1862, and M.D. and C.M. in 1864.

== Marriage and family ==
James Grant Bey was the son of William Grant, a banker, and Mary Grant. He was the brother of Rachel Grant, John Grant, and William Grant.

In 1869 Grant met an American named Adaline Torrey Grant while in Cairo, where he treated her for "Syrian Fever." In 1870 they married in Cairo at the British Consulate followed by the Chapel of American Missionaries. Adaline died in 1886.

Grant later married Florence Sabina Grant from Liverpool; daughter of a ship's captain. The wedding took place at Sefton Park Presbyterian Church in Liverpool in 1890.

Grant was the father of William Torrey Sandilands Grant (also a doctor), Jessie Campbell Morice, James Gibson Grant, Mary Florence Grant, and Elsie Frances Grant.

== Professional career ==
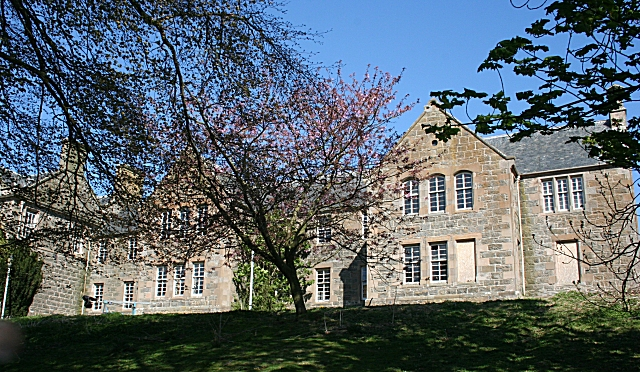
Ladysbridge Hospital, formerly Banff District Lunatic Asylum

He first worked for several months as Assistant in the Aberdeen Royal Lunatic Asylum and then as Superintendent in the Banff District Lunatic Asylum.

In 1866, Grant left to work in Alexandria in Egypt where he helped manage a violent cholera outbreak. This work took place while the Suez Canal was under construction and the 4th global wave of cholera was spreading from Asia to the west. Thousands of the workers on the canal project caught the disease and it was present throughout Egypt. Progress fighting cholera had been made by the British following the Crimean War and with the construction of municipal sewerage systems, and it was becoming clear that it was primarily a water borne disease. As a result of his work in this field, the Sultan of Turkey appointed Grant Chevalier of the Imperial Order of Medjidieh. He returned to Banff in Scotland again in 1867, but in 1868 he went back to settle in Egypt and to work for the government medical service.

He became a physician at the court of the Khedive of Egypt where he was given the honorary title "Bey" in 1880. Although Grant’s intended purpose for travelling to Cairo was to practice medicine, his contributions to the study of ancient Egypt later brought him an international reputation. He made Cairo his home and became one of the most important figures in Egyptological circles at the time. He was a friend of Heinrich Karl Brugsch and then took the young Flinders Petrie under his wing when he first arrived in Egypt. Petrie went on to become the most influential archaeologist in Egyptology at the time. Grant negotiated for Petrie in Arabic and introduced him to his right-hand man for excavation works, Ali Gabri. Petrie’s letters home describe a midnight rescue of Grant from inside the well-shaft of the Great Pyramid, during Petrie’s first visit to Giza. Grant also arranged for Petrie to use a tomb on the east side of the Giza Plateau as accommodation while he carried out his survey. The tomb is now often referred to as Grant's Tomb following Petrie's own habit.

During his own work in the pyramid, Grant re-measured the granite sarcophagus in the King's Chamber and was able to demonstrate that it must have been brought into the monument before it was completed, as it would not fit through the passages. He carried these works out along with an English dentist from Cairo called Mr. Waller who took casts of details of the monument. During another visit, Grant noticed a crack in the south wall of the Queen's Chamber that might have been evidence of an entrance to a shaft similar to those in the King's Chamber. With Waynman Dixon and his workman Bill Grundy they opened up the stone-covered entrance to the narrow shaft. A similar one was found in the north wall. In the north shaft they found three small tools; a copper hooked implement, a granite ball, and a wooden part of a measuring rule. These had been left there during the construction of the Great Pyramid, and Grant and Dixon recognized their importance. They were sent back to the UK and the news was published in several London newspapers. The artefacts became known as the Dixon artefacts. It seems from Smyth's letters that Grant was slightly annoyed that his name had not been mentioned in conjunction with the finds, as he had noticed the crack in the first instance. The ball and copper tool are now in the collection of the British Museum. Grant's daughter inherited the parts of the wooden tool, which were then donated to the University of Aberdeen in 1946. The importance of the latter artefact became evident after the development of C14 radiocarbon dating. Pyramidologist Robert Bauval attempted to track it down at the end of the 20th century, and with the help of Gemma Smith, a librarian at Wichita State University, he was able to establish that it had been sent to Aberdeen. The artefact had, however, been stored in the Asian collection and was not definitively located until 2020 when curator Abeer Eladany found the fragments of wood preserved in a tobacco tin bearing the old Egyptian flag. In 2020, the artefact was carbon dated by the Scottish Universities Research and Reactor Centre (SURRC) laboratory, yielding a date approximately 500–750 years earlier than the conventional date for the construction of the Great Pyramid. The reason for this discrepancy remains unclear, but at present the best hypothesis is that it is an example of 'old wood', a familiar issue when carbon dating ancient samples.

Flinders Petrie was invited to lunch with Dr Grant when he first arrived in Egypt after briefly visiting the previous day with an introduction from Sydney Hall. Grant and his wife were known for their hospitality. They kept an open house for visiting Englishmen and welcomed savants of all nationalities at their Wednesday evening soirées. Petrie stayed with them several times and mentioned that Grant was already aware of his survey report on Stonehenge which had received good reviews in the English press. Petrie and Grant were also both acquaintances of Piazzi Smyth. Grant regarded many of Smyth's pyramid theories with tolerant skepticism and laughed at his timeline theory for the pyramid passages, and it was not until Petrie's detailed survey of the 1880s that many of the outstanding questions were resolved.

Grant built up an important collection of several thousand objects that he made accessible to other scholars in Cairo. This included important Old Kingdom statuary and reliefs, since the Old Kingdom capital Memphis was directly south of Cairo. As a doctor, Grant also had an interest in studying ancient Egyptian anatomy and the mummification processes. His cabinet of scarabs demonstrates his systematic approach to collecting and he built up a high level of knowledge about the objects.

He and his family later donated most of his personal collection of some 2500 items to the University of Aberdeen. The University’s museum now includes a diverse range of over 4000 Egyptian antiquities.

Officially, he held the appointment of Honorary Surgeon to Her Majesty's British Consulate in Cairo, and Medical Advisor to the Consular Court, as well as Senior Surgeon to the Egyptian Government Railways. He was a Fellow of the Society of Science, Letters, and Arts in London, and Member of the Biblical Archaeological Society. He was co-editor of the Arabic medical journal El-Shiffa.

In October 1887 he was invited to give an address at the University of Harvard where he spoke about the culture of ancient Egypt at Boylston Hall. He was introduced there by Prof. Cook as the most eminent authority of the present time on the language, literature and art of the ancient Egyptians. He was also a delegate at a medical conference in Washington on that trip.

== Works ==
- The New Egyptian Sanitary Law, in The Lancet 123, no. 3161. London. 29 March 1884. p. 572. doi:10.1016/S0140-6736(02)22530-1.
- The History of Hygiene in Modern Egypt, with Critical Remarks and Practical Suggestions, in the Proceedings of the Ninth International Medical Congress, Washington D.C. Philadelphia: Wm. F. Fell & Co. 1887. pp. 436–442.
- "The Sanitary Conditions of India and Its Teachings". The Sanitarian. 234. 1889.
- The Climate of Egypt in Geological, Prehistoric, and Historic Times, in the Journal of Transactions of the Victoria Institute of the Philosophical Society of Great Britain (PDF). Vol. XXXII. 1900. pp. 87–105.
