= Ses Fontanelles shipwreck =

4th-century shipwreck off Mallorca

The Ses Fontanelles shipwreck is a fourth-century shipwreck that was discovered just offshore from the Ses Fontanelles wetlands of Mallorca in July 2019. The ancient Roman vessel was found approximately 65 metres (213 ft) from the shore. It was mostly covered in sand, and just 2 metres (6.6 ft) below the surface of the water. The wreck's shallow position near a popular beach at Can Pastilla led to concerns about potential looting, so archaeological excavations were quickly arranged. Materials excavated in July and August 2019 included many amphorae, fragments of cookware and other belongings of the ship's crew, and parts of the ship's hull. Many of the amphorae had intact tituli picti inscriptions describing their contents, which included fish sauce and olive oil. The finds were taken to the Museo de Mallorca for study. At the end of the excavation, a polyethylene cover was placed over the remaining material; subsequent storms re-covered the site with sand. Additional excavation was conducted in 2021 and 2022.

== See also ==
- List of shipwrecks in the 1st millennium
