= Cleopatra (cylinder ship) =

1877 British ship

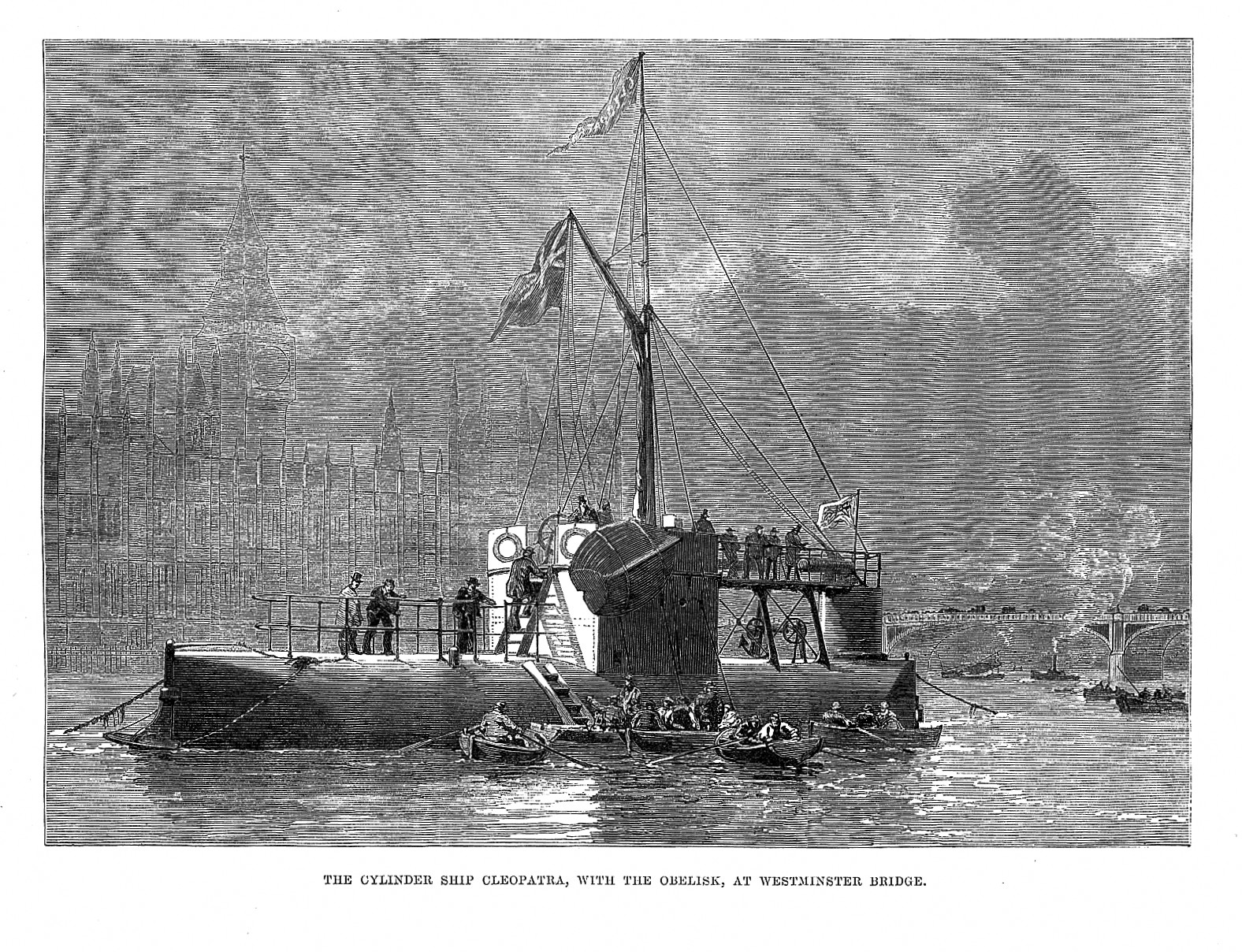
- Cleopatra in the River Thames

History
- Name: Cleopatra
- Builder: Thames Ironworks
- Launched: 1877
- Out of service: 1878

General characteristics
- Length: 92 ft (28 m)
- Beam: 16 ft (4.9 m)

The Cleopatra was a cylinder ship built to take Cleopatra's Needle from Alexandria, Egypt to London, England in 1877.

The Egyptian obelisk weighed more than 200 t (200,000 kg). It was encased in a cylindrical iron pontoon, which was then rolled by means of levers and chains down a track into the sea. The pontoon was fitted with a deck-house, mast, rudder and steering gear, and was crewed by Maltese sailors. The pontoon was towed to Great Britain by the steamship Olga, leaving on 21 September 1877. Captain Henry Carter supervised Cleopatra's building and became her commander, while Captain Booth commanded Olga.

On 14 October 1877 the Cleopatra was in danger of sinking off France in the Bay of Biscay. The Olga sent six volunteers in a boat to take off the Cleopatra's crew, but the boat swamped and the volunteers drowned. Eventually the Olga managed to draw alongside and rescue Cleopatra's crew of five and skipper. They cut the towrope and left the vessel adrift in the bay. Five days later a ship spotted the Cleopatra floating undamaged off the northern coast of Spain, and she was towed to Ferrol, Galicia. There the steamship Anglia arrived to tow her to London. The ships arrived at Gravesend, England on 21 January 1878. Cleopatra was broken up immediately after the obelisk was removed on 6 July 1878. The Needle was installed on the Thames Embankment in September 1878, where it still stands as of 2026.

== Design ==
Designed by engineer John Dixon, Cleopatra was essentially a hollow iron cylinder 92 ft (28 m) long and 16 ft (4.9 m) in diameter. It was supplemented by a bow, vertical stern, rudder, two sidewalls, and a mast for sails to stabilise the vessel. A bridge was built to accommodate the crew.

Designed as a pontoon, the cylindrical shape was chosen due to budget constraints (private funding by patrons). The cylinder, made of sheet-metal curves riveted together, was literally built around the obelisk, with circular internal partitions used as cradles for the monolith.

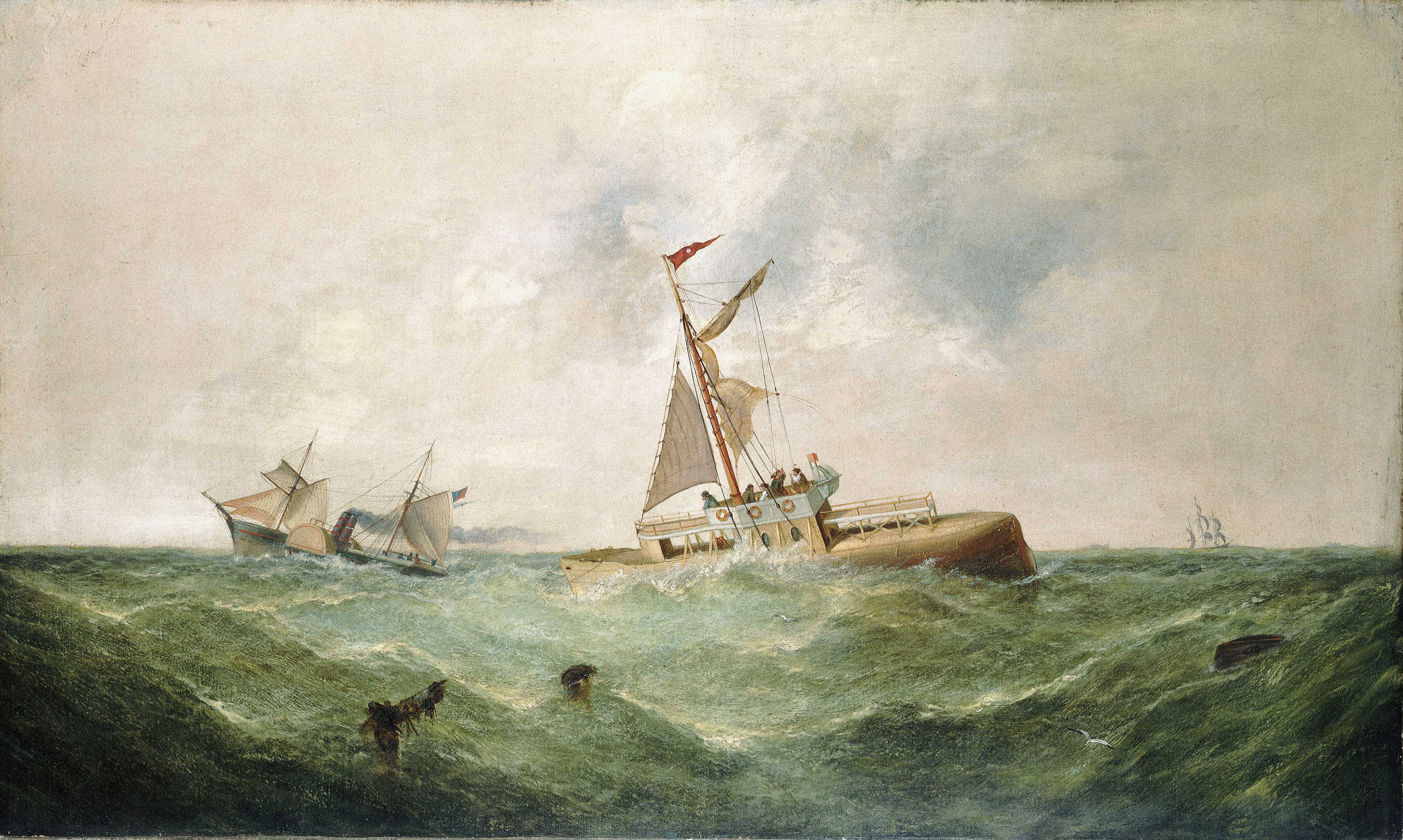
Cleopatra's Needle being brought to England, 1877

Both ends were topped with a crown of planks. The cylinder could ride on the Nile with minimal effort, using cables driven by winches. At the time of launching, a rock concealed in the mud punctured the cylinder, which then blocked the waterway.

After towing to a dry dock of the Egyptian Admiralty, the cylinder was turned into a ship by adding an internal ballast made of rails, a bow and a stern with rudder and a roof to shelter the crew. It carried a single mast rigged with a gaff and foresail.

Once completed, the ship looked like a primitive submarine, but its seagoing capabilities were more limited. In retrospect, the decision to cross the Bay of Biscay in the autumn was a risky one.

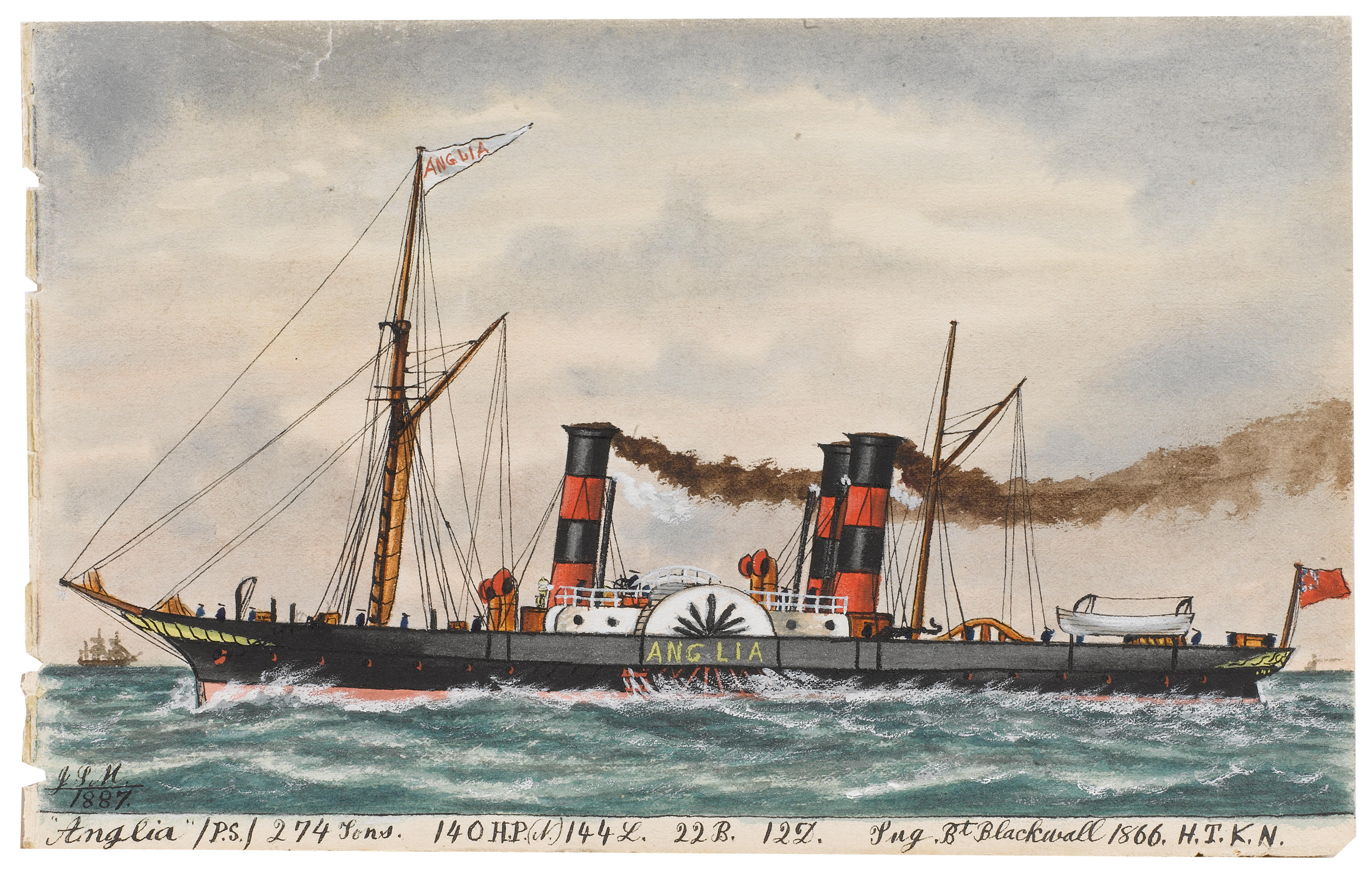
Watkins' tug PS Anglia, by James Scott Maxwell

== See also ==
- SS Dessoug, the ship used to take the other Cleopatra's Needle to New York
- Cleopatra's Needle (New York City)
