= Abeer Eladany =

- Occupation: Curatorial Assistant at the University of Aberdeen

Academic background
- Education: University of Manchester

Academic work
- Discipline: Egyptologist, archaeologist

Abeer Eladany FSAScot is a Cairo born Egyptologist and archaeologist. She has a particular interest in human remains, the history of Egyptology and museology with a particular focus on ethics and repatriation and making museum collections accessible. She is known for her work in Egyptology, particularly for finding a fragment of wood from Great Pyramid of Giza in the University of Aberdeen's collection in 2021.

== Education and career ==
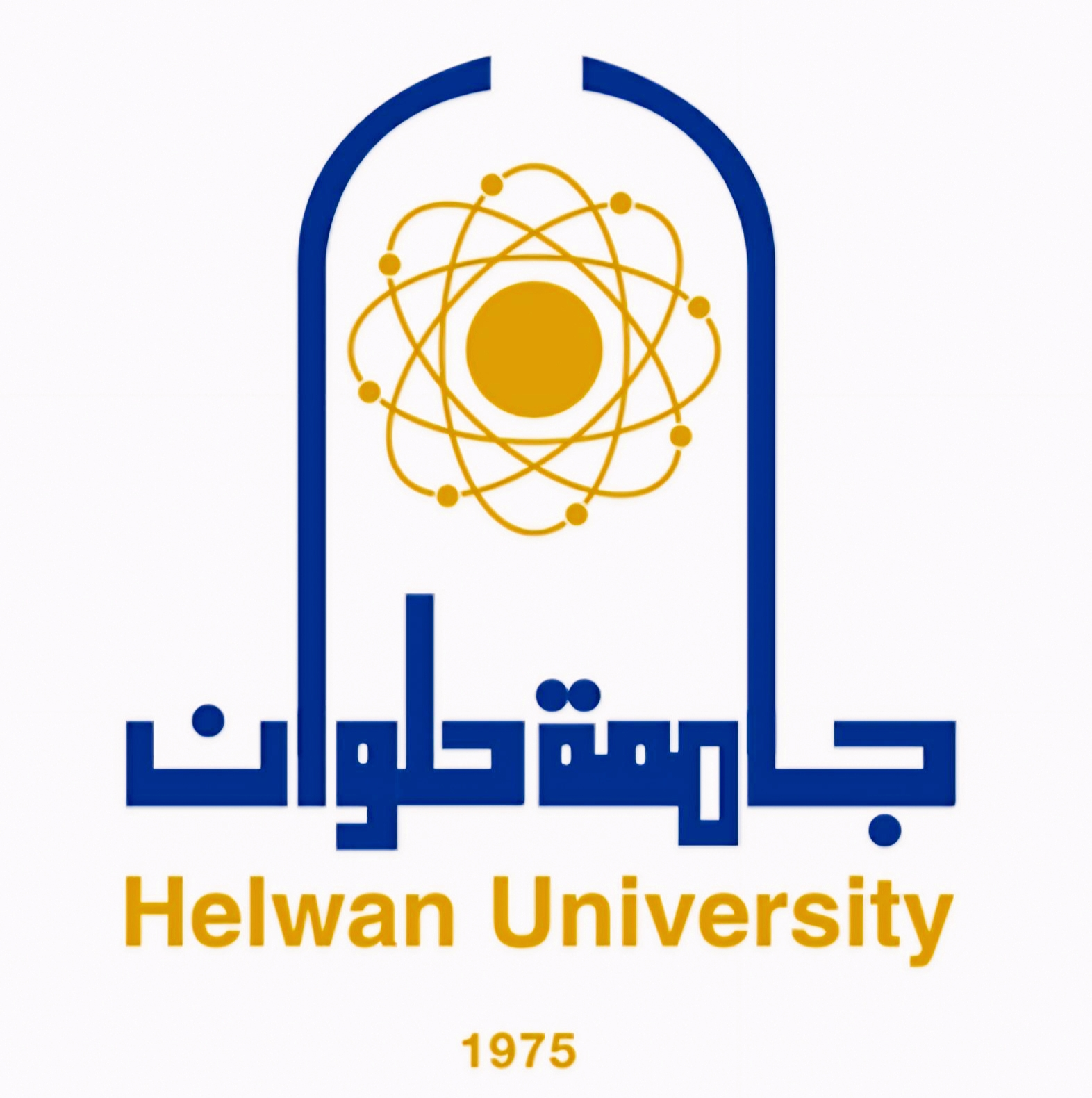
Helwan University

Eladany studied conservation and Egyptian archaeology at Cairo University and Helwan University. After graduating she worked at the Egyptian Museum for over a decade. She then moved to the UK to pursue her MSc and PhD in biomedical and forensic studies in Egyptology at the University of Manchester, where she studied Egyptian art in the collections housed at British Museum in London.

In 2015 Eladany gained a MLitt in museum studies from the University of Aberdeen.

She is currently the curatorial assistant at the University of Aberdeen, where she has managed the art collection since 2018. She curates the art collection, plans and coordinates art installations at the university, and supports the curation of other university collections.

Eladany is a fellow of the Society of Antiquaries of Scotland. She has been involved in a wide range of volunteer and trustee work including community projects, locality planning, and heritage groups in the UK. She is a member of the Empire, Slavery & Scotland's Museums Steering Group to address how Scotland's museums can represent a more accurate portrayal of the country's history of colonialism and slavery. The Steering Group was formed following a motion in the Scottish Parliament in 2020 and published six recommendations in 2022 which were subsequently accepted by the Scottish Government.

Eladany is a trustee of the Museums Galleries Scotland, and a board member of the Egypt Exploration Society.

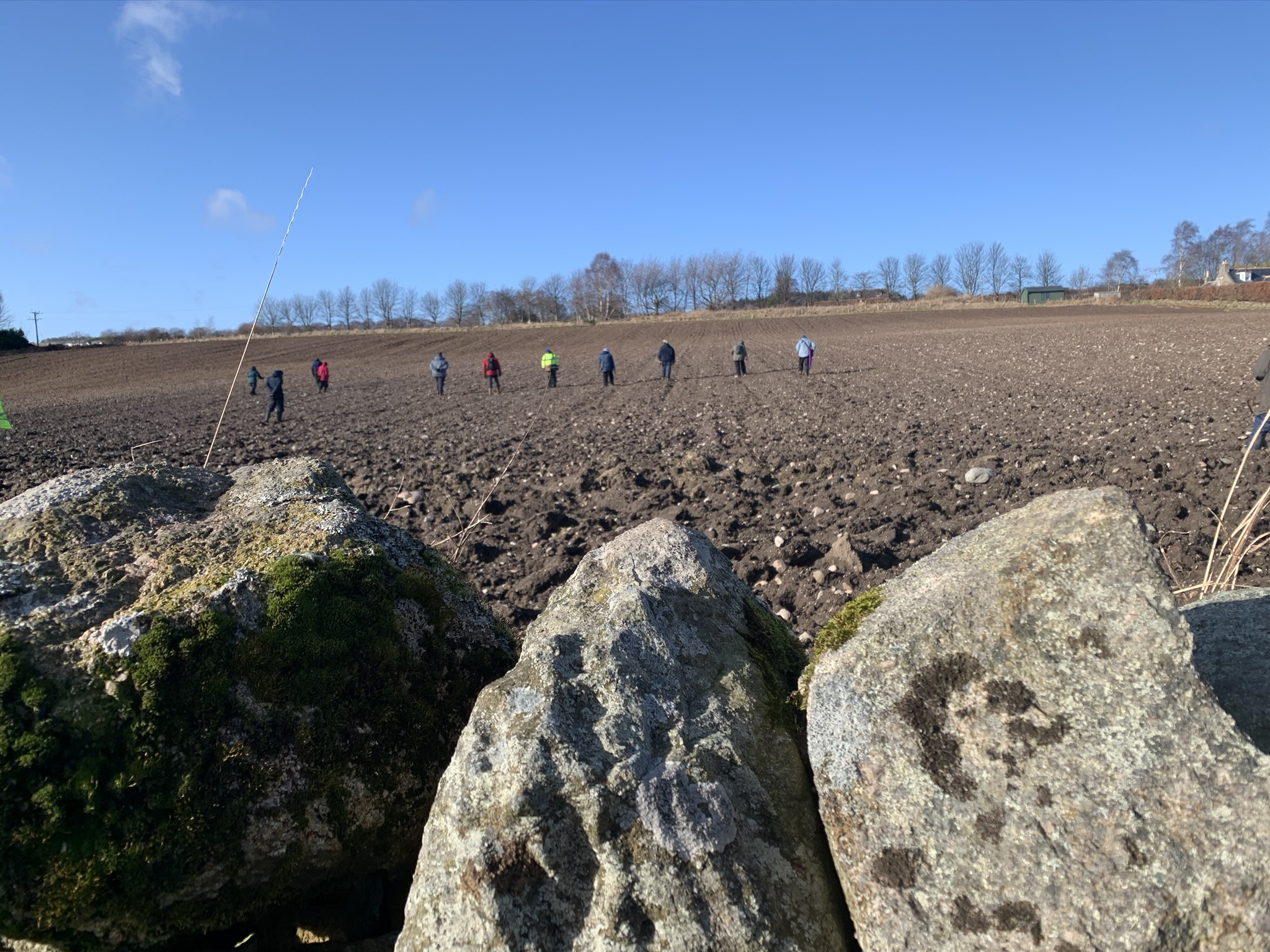
Members of Mesolithic Deeside fieldwalking on a ploughed field searching for lithics

She is a supporter of Mesolithic Deeside, a group of archaeology students and local volunteers who focus on investigating the Mesolithic history of the area surrounding the River Dee. Eladany periodically joins them for their fieldwalking events, supports their public engagement and outreach events, and curates their temporary exhibitions.

== Excavations ==
Eladany has participated in many excavations in Egypt and Scotland, especially in Aberdeenshire. Excavations in Aberdeenshire she has participated in include:

- the excavation of the medieval parish church of East Kirk of Saint Nicholas
- the excavation of masonry that is potentially related to an early Franciscan friary or early college structure on the Marischal College Quad
- the excavation of human remains dating to the 13th century at Robert Gordon College
- the excavation of a Neolithic site in Aden country park
- the excavation of the site of 1500 year old monastery at Deer Abbey
- excavation of the grammar school at King's College.

In 2018 she was involved in the excavations at Ness of Brodgar in Orkney.

== Location of one of the Great Pyramid artefacts ==
Shortly after moving to Aberdeen in 2005, Eladany joined a team of volunteers at the former Marischal Museum, which was part of the University of Aberdeen. In 2001 a record was found that indicated that one of three items taken from inside the Great Pyramid of Giza, "a five-inch piece of cedar", had been donated to the University of Aberdeen by Grant's daughter in 1946. James Grant was a graduate of the University of Aberdeen and had assisted Waynman Dixon in the exploration of Queen's Camber. When the artefact was initially donated its significance was not thoroughly understood, and when it was catalogued the location where it was stored was not recorded. For years the wood fragment was somewhere in the university's extensive collections, but despite multiple searches it was never found.

In 2018 Eladany was asked to be part of team to conduct a review of the university's collection of Asian art. During this survey she and Christina MacKenzie found a small cigar box with old Egyptian flag on it. The box had an old serial number that did not match the serial number in the Asian collection. When cross-referenced with other records, the serial number matched the serial number of the cedar fragment in the Egyptian collection.

The recovery of the cedar fragments is significant because, since the cedar is an organic material, it provided an opportunity to radiocarbon date an object from the Great Pyramid. Radiocarbon dating was undertaken in 2020, and the results indicated that the wood dates to sometime between 3341 BCE and 3094 BCE. This date range is over 500 years earlier than historical records had indicated, which date pyramid to the reign of pharaoh Khufu, c. 2600 BCE. The age of the artefact may reflect the age of wood when it was put in the pyramid. It may have been from the core of a long-lived tree. Alternatively, since wood was scarce in ancient Egypt, it was often reused, so the cedar fragment may have already been old by time it was placed in Pyramid.
