= Cleopatra's Needle, London =

Ancient Egyptian obelisk in London

Cleopatra's Needle
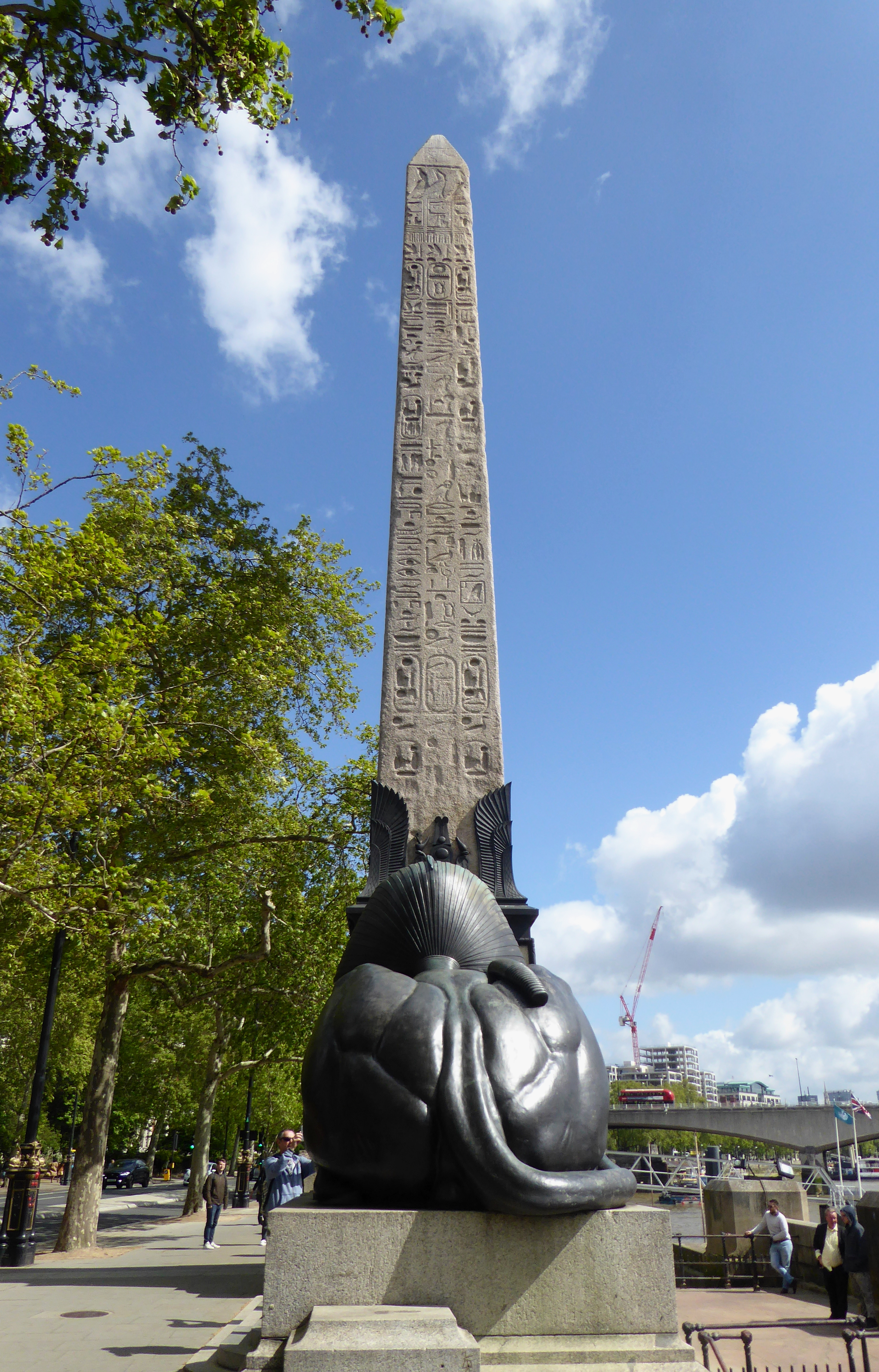
- The obelisk in 2019
- Interactive map of Cleopatra's Needle
- Location: Victoria Embankment, City of Westminster, London, United Kingdom
- Coordinates: 51°30′31″N 0°07′13″W
- Type: Obelisk
- Material: Red granite
- Height: 20.88 m (68 ft 6 in)
- Weight: 187 long tons (190 t; 209 short tons)
- Completion date: c. 1450 BC
- Opening date: 12 September 1878
- Dedicated to: Thutmose III and Ramesses II (originally); Lord Nelson and Sir Ralph Abercromby (1819 presentation)

Listed Building – Grade I
- Official name: Cleopatra's Needle
- Designated: 24 February 1958
- Reference no.: 1066169

Cleopatra's Needle in London is one of a pair of obelisks, together named Cleopatra's Needles, that were moved from the ruins of the Caesareum of Alexandria in Egypt, in the 19th century. Inscribed by Thutmose III and later Ramesses II of the Egyptian New Kingdom, the obelisk was moved in 12 BC to Alexandria, where it remained for over 1,800 years.

It was presented to the Prince Regent in 1819 by the ruler of Egypt, Muhammad Ali, as a diplomatic gift to mark British victories over the French in Egypt, namely the Battle of the Nile in 1798 and the 2nd Battle of Alexandria in 1801. Although the British government welcomed the gesture, it declined to pay to move the obelisk to London. It was subsequently erected in the West End of London on the Victoria Embankment in Westminster, in 1878.

== History ==
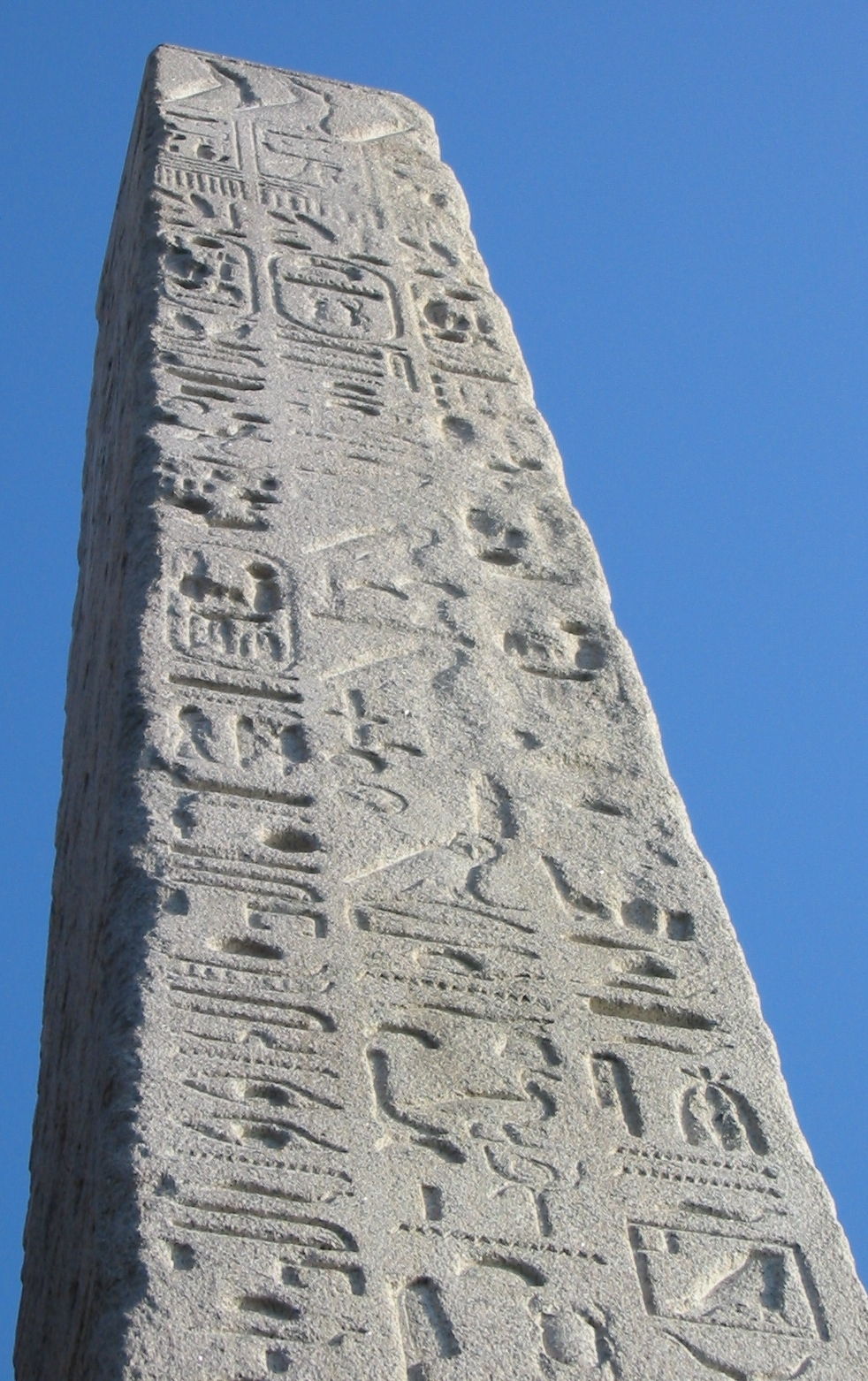
The inscriptions on the two side columns commemorate military victories of Ramesses II, while the middle column contains an older inscription of Thutmose III

The obelisk was originally erected in the Egyptian city of Heliopolis on the orders of Thutmose III, around 1450 BC. It is made of red granite, brought from the quarries of Aswan, near the first cataract of the Nile River. Thutmose III had a single column of text carved on each face, these were translated by Ernest Budge. Other inscriptions were added around 200 years later by Ramesses II to commemorate his military victories: these are in two columns on each face, flanking the original inscriptions. The obelisks were moved to Alexandria and set up in the Caesareum, a temple built by Cleopatra in honour of Mark Antony or Julius Caesar by the Romans in 12 BC, during the reign of Augustus, but one was toppled some time later. This had the fortuitous effect of burying its faces and so preserving most of the hieroglyphs from the effects of weathering.

== Transport from Alexandria ==
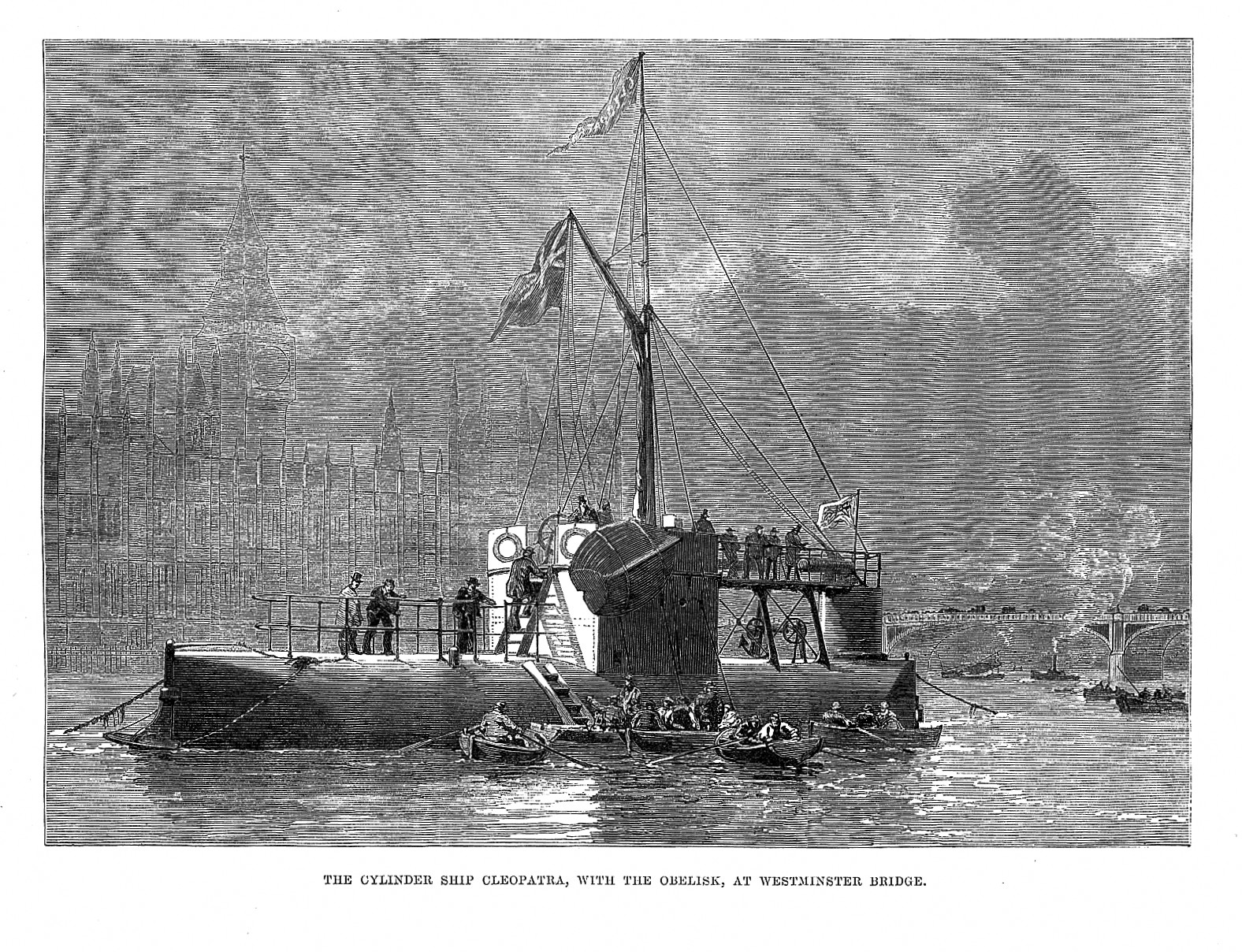
Cleopatra, cylinder ship in the River Thames

The obelisk remained in Alexandria until 1877 when Sir William Wilson, a distinguished anatomist and dermatologist, sponsored its transportation to London from Alexandria at a cost of some £10,000. Following consultation with Mathew William Simpson, a railway and locomotive engineer working for the Khedive of Egypt and a friend of Wilson who shared his passion for Egyptian antiquities, it was dug out of the sand in which it had been buried for nearly 2,000 years and was encased in a great iron cylinder, 92 feet (28 metres) long and 16 feet (4.9 metres) in diameter. This was designed by the engineer John Dixon (from original plans drawn up for Wilson by Mathew William Simpson, who was unable to undertake the work due to being under contract to the Khedive), and dubbed Cleopatra, to be commanded by Captain Carter. It was built at the Thames Iron Works, shipped to Alexandria in separate pieces, and built around the obelisk by Waynman Dixon, John's brother. It had a vertical stem and stern, a rudder, two bilge keels, a mast for balancing sails, and a deck house. This acted as a floating pontoon which was to be towed to London by the ship Olga, commanded by Captain Booth. The ships set off from Alexandria on 21 September 1877.

On 14 October 1877, a storm in the Bay of Biscay caused the ship Cleopatra to roll violently and become uncontrollable, forcing the towropes to be cut. The Olga launched a rescue boat with six volunteers - William Askin, Joseph Benbow, Michael Burns, William Donald, James Gardiner, and William Patan - but the boat capsized, and all six crew members died.

Captain Booth on the Olga eventually managed to get his ship next to the Cleopatra and rescued Captain Carter and the five crew members aboard Cleopatra. Captain Booth reported the Cleopatra "abandoned and sinking", but she stayed afloat, drifting in the Bay, until found four days later by Spanish trawler boats, and then rescued by the Glasgow steamer Fitzmaurice and taken to Ferrol in Spain for repairs. The master of the Fitzmaurice lodged a salvage claim of £5,000 which had to be settled before departure from Ferrol, but it was negotiated down and settled for £2,000 in the Admiralty Court. The William Watkins Ltd paddle tug Anglia, under the command of Captain David Glue, was then commissioned to tow the Cleopatra back to the Thames.

On their arrival in the estuary on 21 January 1878, the school children of Gravesend were given the day off. The Anglia moored at East India Docks. A wooden model of the obelisk had previously been placed outside the Houses of Parliament, but the location had been rejected, so the London needle was finally erected on the Victoria Embankment on 12 September 1878.

== Erection ==
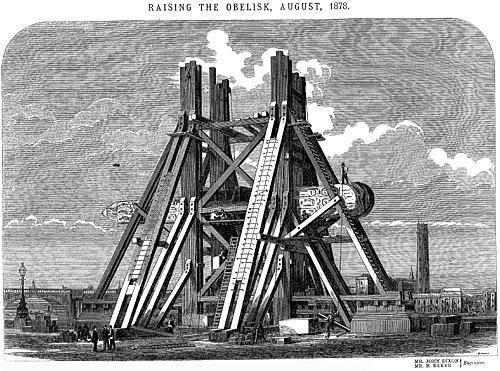
London's Needle being erected, August 1878.

The original master stone mason who worked on the granite foundation was Lambeth-born William Henry Gould (1822–1891).

On erection of the obelisk in 1878, a time capsule was concealed in the front part of the pedestal, containing 12 photographs of the best-looking English women of the day, a box of hairpins, a box of cigars, several tobacco pipes, a set of imperial weights, a baby's bottle, some children's toys, a shilling razor, a hydraulic jack and some samples of the cable used in the erection, a 3-foot (90-centimetre) bronze model of the monument, a complete set of contemporary British coins, a rupee, a portrait of Queen Victoria, a history of the transport of the monument plans, written on vellum, a translation of the inscriptions, copies of the Bible in several languages, a copy of John 3:16 in 215 languages, a copy of Whitaker's Almanack, a Bradshaw Railway Guide, a map of London, and copies of 10 daily newspapers. A 24 inch metal ruler was also reportedly included.

Cleopatra's Needle is flanked by two faux-Egyptian bronze sphinxes, designed by the English architect George Vulliamy, modelled by Charles Mabey and made at the Eccleston Iron Works in Pimlico in 1881. The sphinxes bear hieroglyphic inscriptions that say netjer nefer men-kheper-re di ankh, which translates as "the good god, Thuthmosis III given life". These sphinxes appear to be looking at the Needle rather than guarding it, due to the sphinxes' improper or backwards installation. The Embankment has other Egyptian flourishes, such as buxom winged sphinxes on the armrests of benches.

On 4 September 1917, during World War 1, a bomb from a German air raid landed near the needle. In commemoration of this event, the damage remains unrepaired to this day and is clearly visible in the form of shrapnel holes and gouges on the western sphinx. Restoration work was carried out in 2005.

== Plaques ==
North‑west, facing street:

Through the patriotic zeal of Erasmus Wilson F.R.S. this obelisk was brought from Alexandria encased in an iron cylinder. It was abandoned during a storm in the Bay of Biscay, recovered and erected on this spot by John Dixon C.E., in the 42nd year of the reign of Queen Victoria, 1878

North‑east:

This obelisk quarried at Syene was erected at On (Heliopolis) by the Pharaoh Thothmes III about 1500 B.C. Lateral inscriptions were added nearly two centuries later by Rameses the Great. Removed during the Greek dynasty to Alexandria, the royal city of Cleopatra, it was there erected in the 18th year of Augustus Caesar B.C. 12

South‑west:

This obelisk, prostrate for centuries on the sands of Alexandria, was presented to the British nation A.D. 1819 by Mahommed Ali, Viceroy of Egypt, a worthy memorial of our distinguished countrymen, Nelson and Abercromby

South-east, facing river:

William Askin · James Gardiner · Joseph Benbow · Michael Burns · William Donald · William Patan Perished in a bold attempt to succour the crew of the obelisk ship “Cleopatra” during the storm October 14th 1877

On plinth of bronze sphinx:

The scars that disfigure the pedestal of the obelisk, the bases of the sphinxes, and the right hand sphinx, were caused by fragments of a bomb dropped in the roadway close to this spot, in the first raid on London by German aeroplanes a few minutes before midnight on Tuesday 4th September 1917

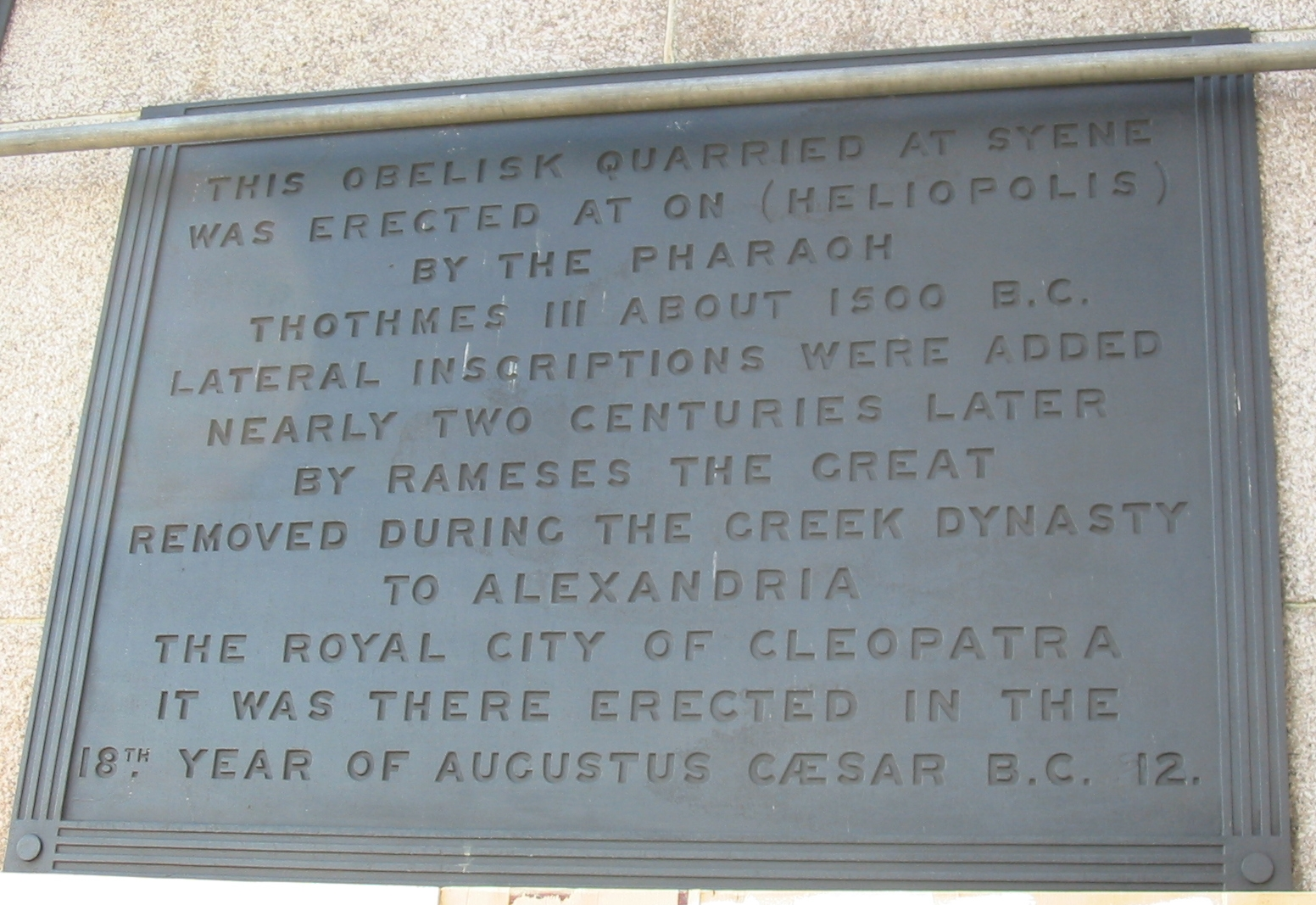
North-east plaque

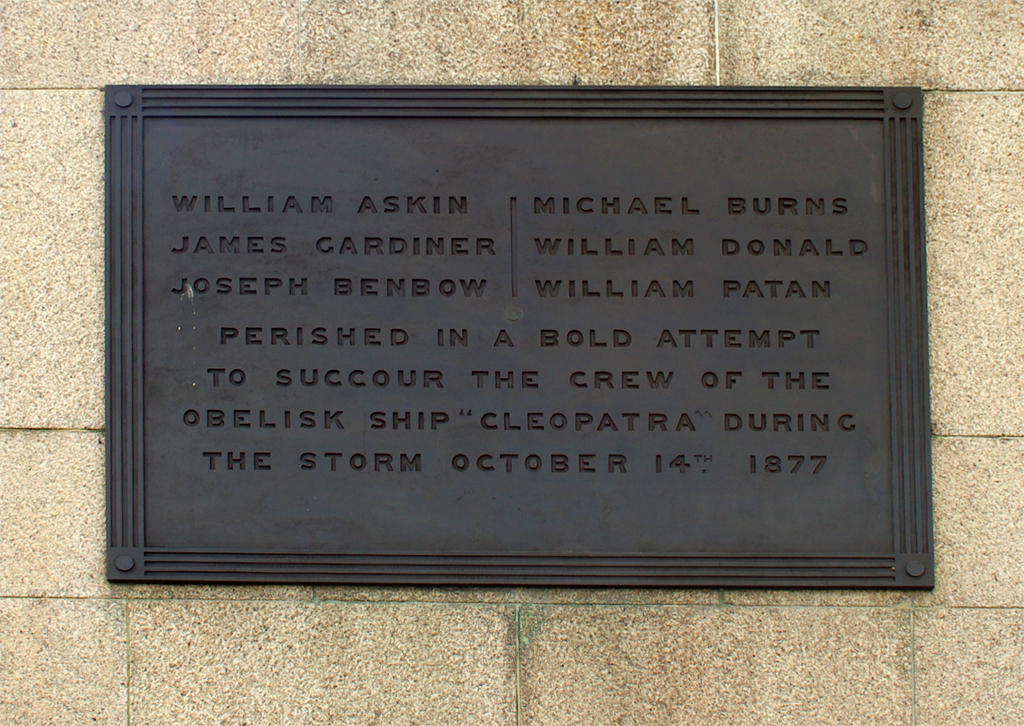
South-east plaque

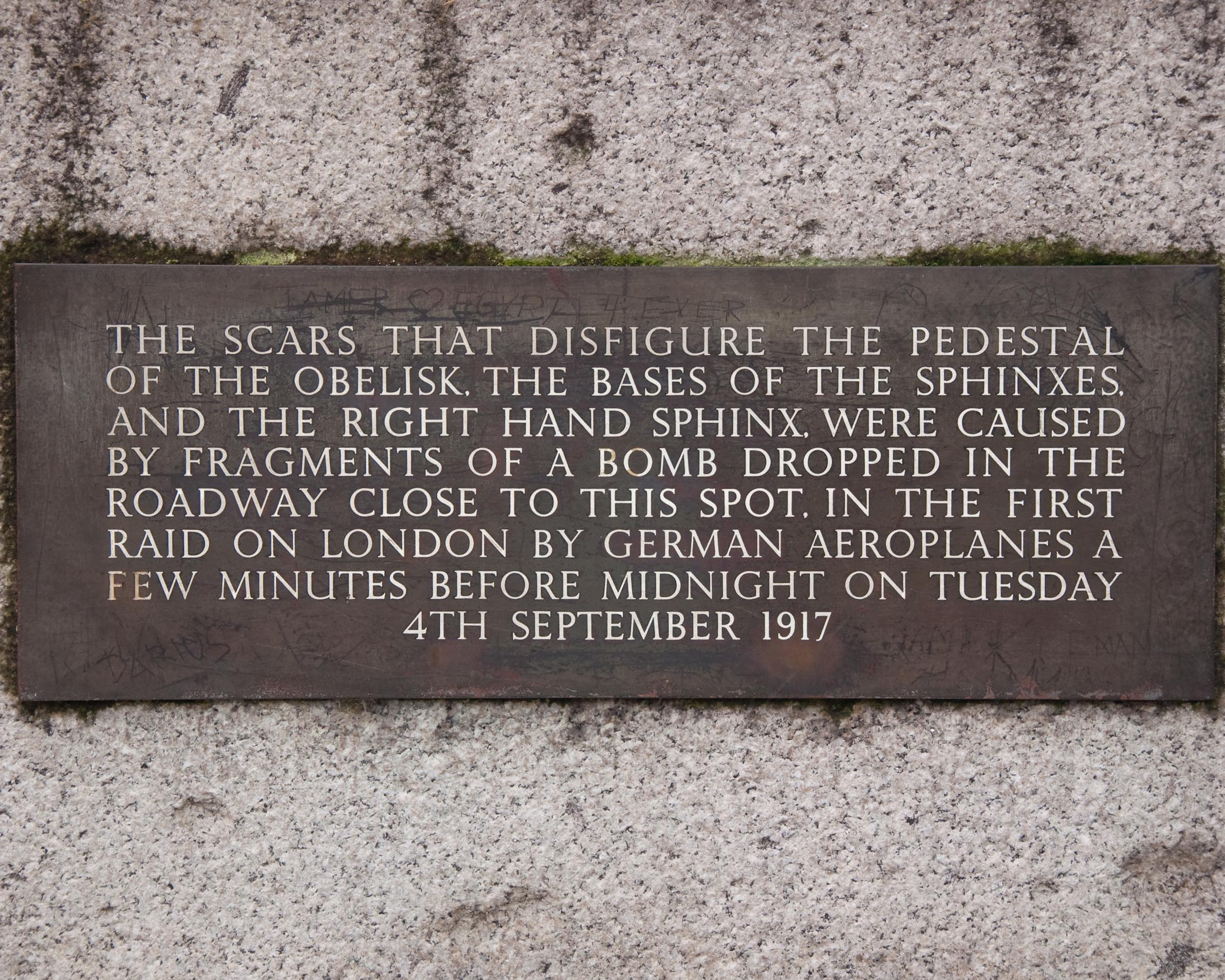
Sphinx plaque

== Gallery ==
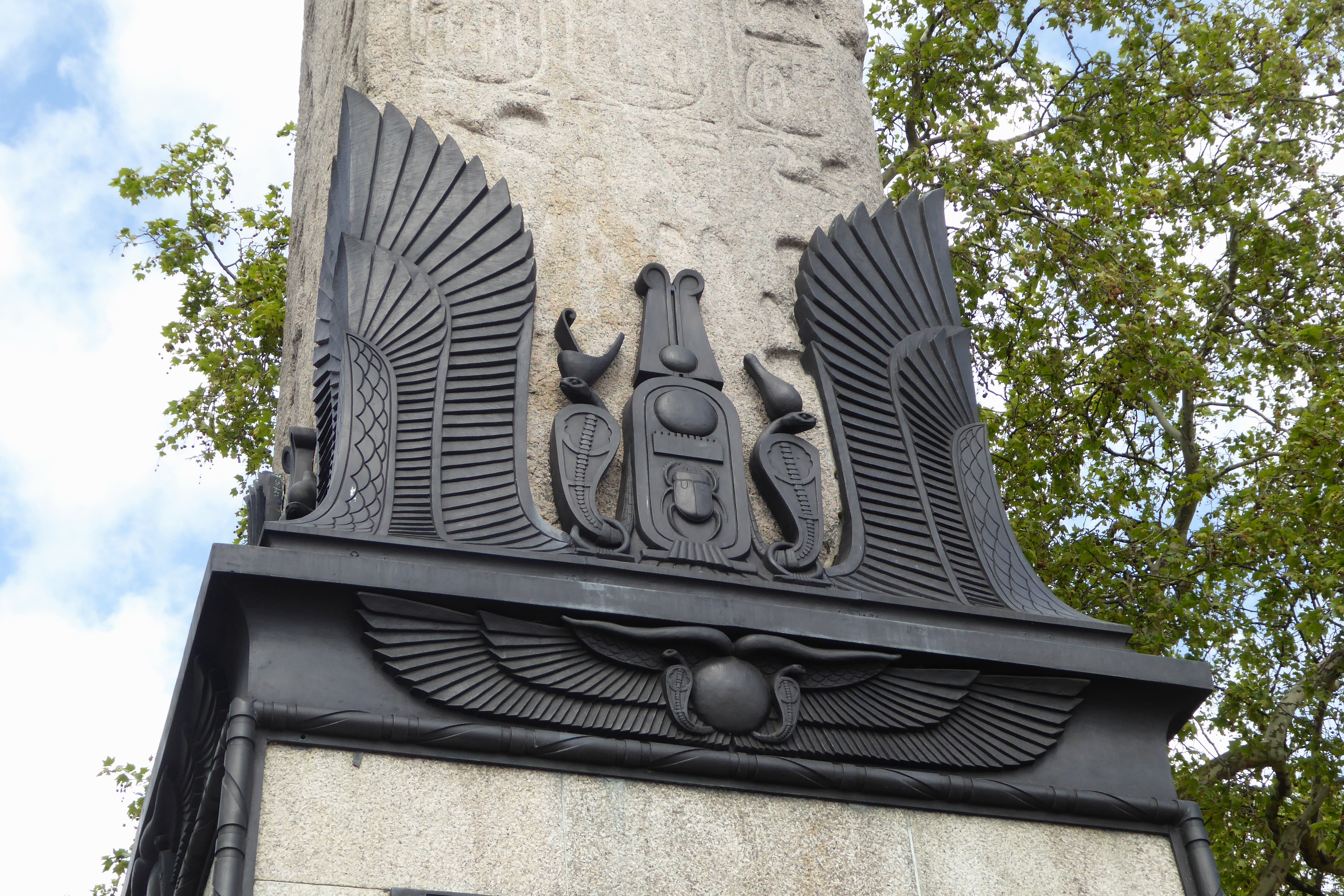
Egyptian-style additions at the base of the obelisk

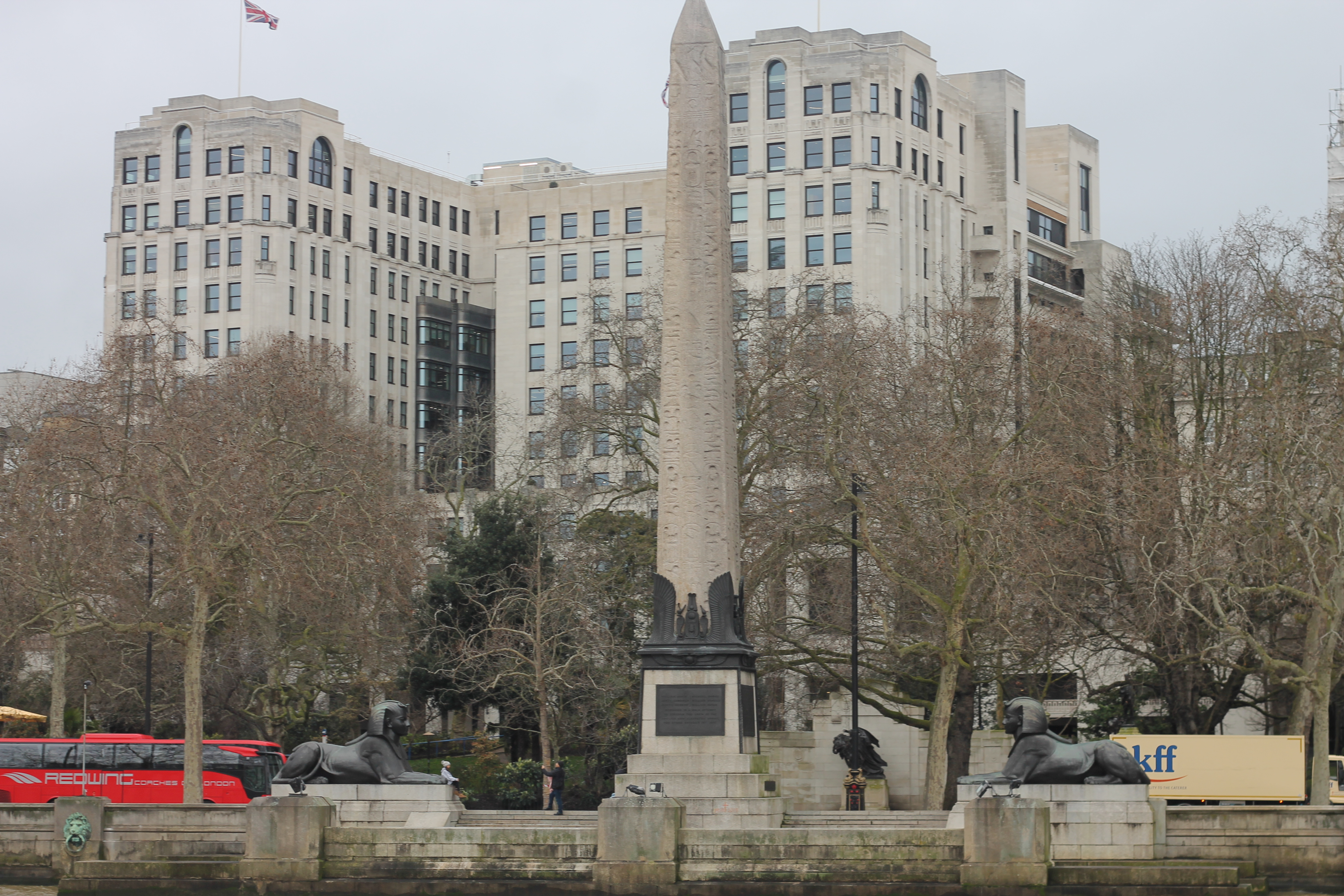
Cleopatra's Needle as seen from the River Thames

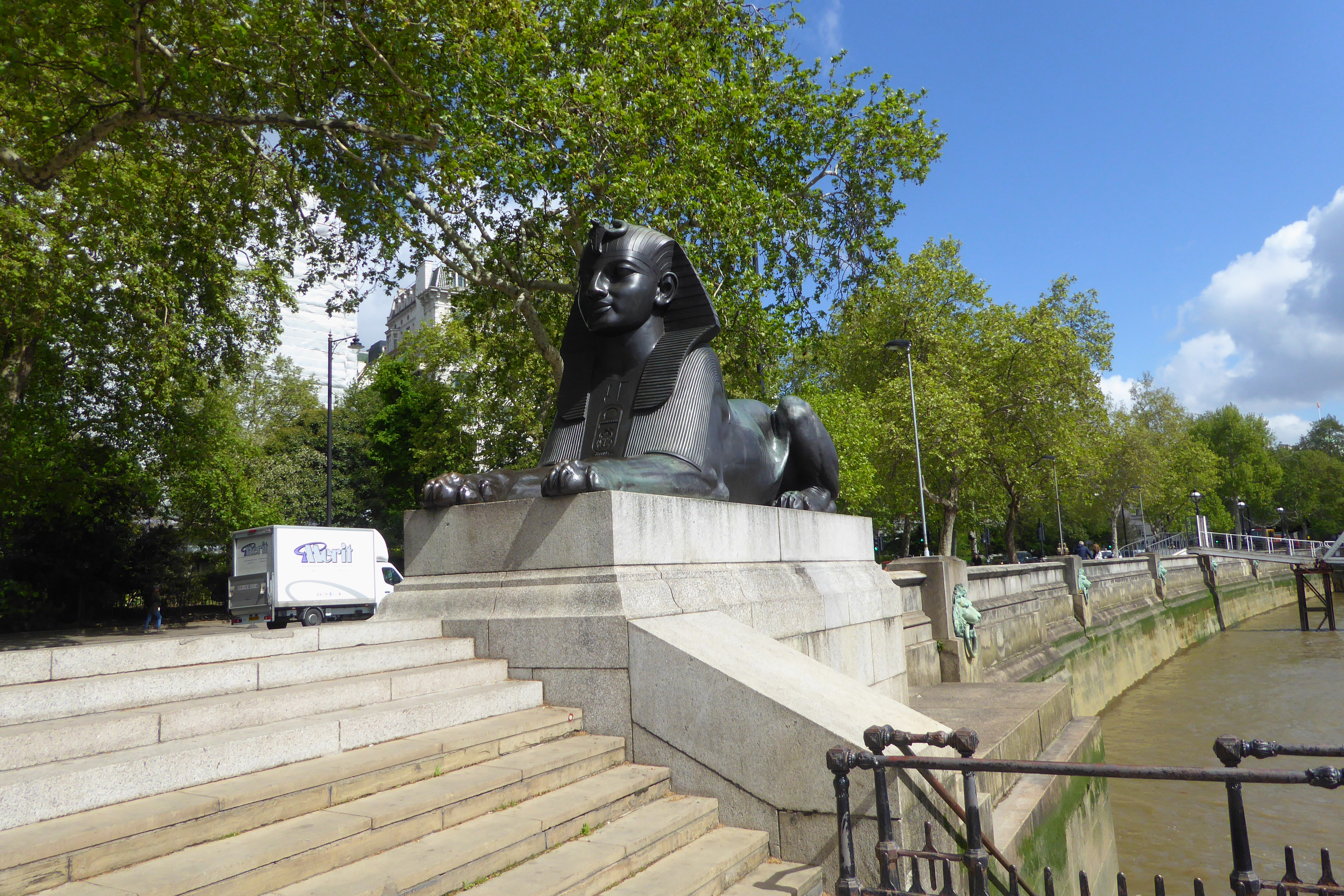
Sphinx to the east of Cleopatra's Needle

== See also ==
- List of Egyptian obelisks
